= Lift fan =

Aircraft propulsion configuration with fans in a fixed wing

VTOL disc loading lift efficiency

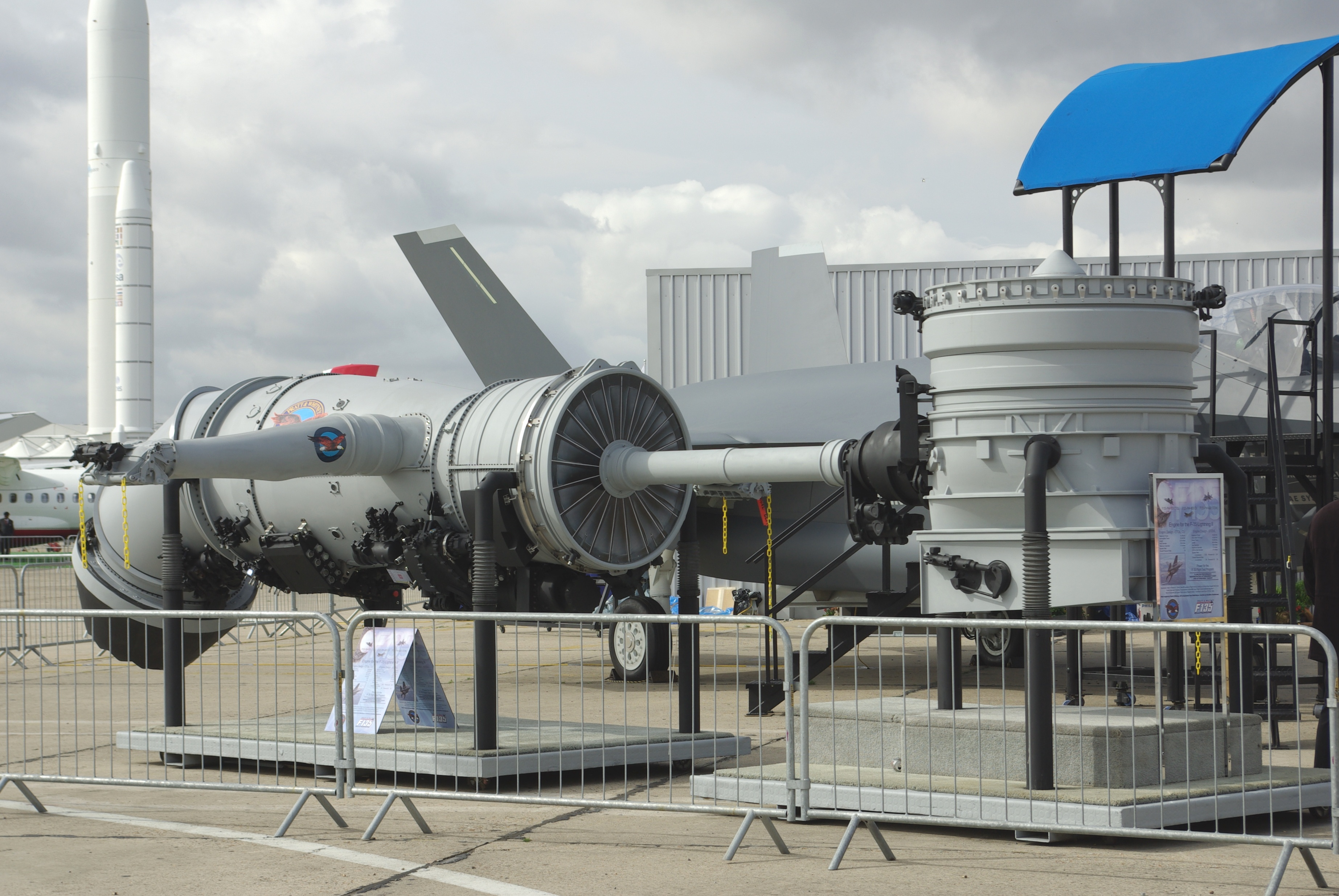
Rolls-Royce LiftSystem, a shaft-driven lift fan, along with its engine, the Pratt & Whitney F135

Lift fan is an aircraft configuration in which lifting fans are located in large holes in an otherwise conventional fixed wing or fuselage. It is used for V/STOL operation.

The aircraft takes off using the fans to provide lift, then transitions to fixed-wing lift in forward flight. Several experimental craft have been flown, but only the F-35 Lightning II entered into production.

== History ==
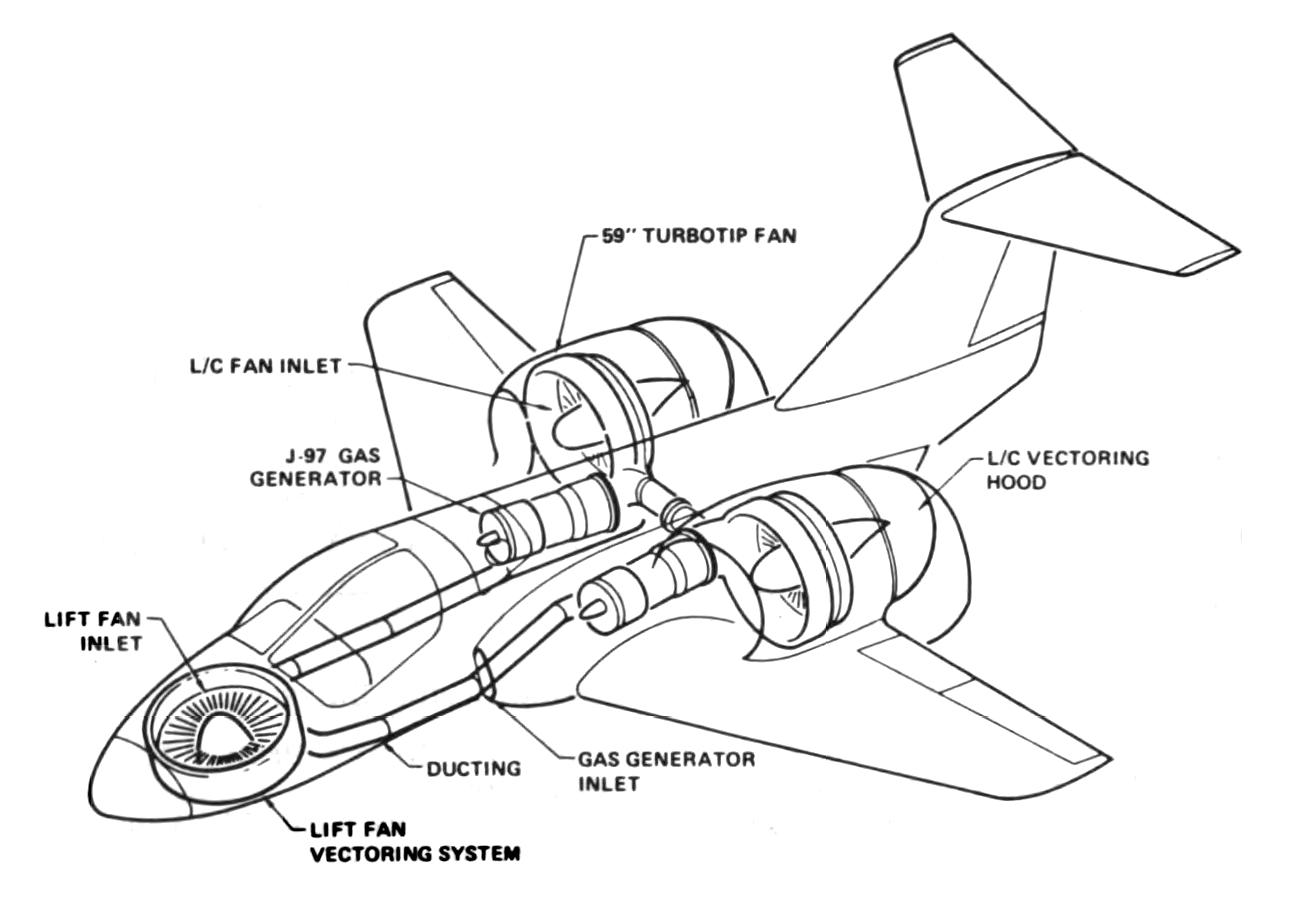
NASA-US Navy joint Lift Fan Technology Demonstrator program, 1975

A number of experimental aircraft were evaluated in the USA during the late 1950s and throughout much of the 1960s.

The Republic Aviation AP-100 was a prototype VTOL 6x General Electric J85 Turbojet engined nuclear capable strike fighter concept designed by Alexander Kartveli that had 3x ducted fans in the centre of its fuselage and tail as a possible contender for the TFX Program.

The Avro Canada Avrocar, commissioned by the US, was intended to be a technology demonstrator for a supersonic VTOL aircraft. It featured a single central fan in a circular flying wing, with engine thrust directed rearwards for forward flight. It underwent trials between 1958 and 1961 but, due to its unstable "flying saucer" aerodynamics and lower than expected thrust, never flew out of ground effect. The Verticraft Verticar of 1961 was a similar single-fan, directed-thrust, all-wing (or lifting body) aircraft, of conventional but very low-aspect-ratio wing planform. It failed to fly. A tandem-fan version was proposed but never built. By contrast the Ryan XV-5 Vertifan of 1964 was an otherwise conventional delta-wing jet. It had a large fan in each wing and a third, smaller fan in the nose to provide balance in pitch. It was more successful, with one of the two prototypes flying until 1971.

Vanguard 2C VTOL

The Vanguard C2 and C2D Omniplane had two fans side by side, with one in each wing. It underwent tethered trials between 1959 and 1962 but never flew untethered. In the late 1960s NASA conducted wind tunnel experiments on a series of larger aircraft designs using different numbers of fans in the wings.

Beginning with a one-sixth scale model in 1962, Paul Moller has been experimenting with the flying saucer configuration ever since. All have had a central cockpit but have varied between a single lift fan surrounding the cockpit, twin fans behind the cockpit or, more recently, eight individual fans distributed around it. Some examples such as the XM-2 of 1965 have been able to hover within ground effect. The artificially stabilised M200X was re-engined in 1989 and can fly out of ground effect, but has not entered production.

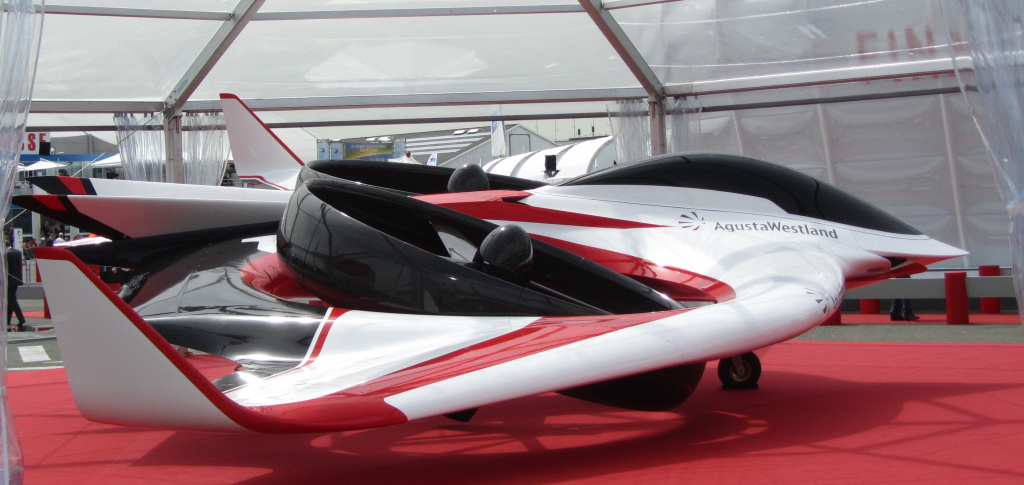
AgustaWestland Project Zero showing its tilting lift fan

Several projects were announced in 2010 and 2011. The Ray passenger aircraft had four fans arranged approximately in a square, similarly to a quadrotor, with a small fan in front of a larger one behind it in each wing. The Lockheed Martin VARIOUS was a multi-role military UAV with twin fans side by side, one in each wing. The Northrop MUVR ship-to-shore resupply aircraft similarly had a fan in each wing. Unlike these the Anglo-Italian AgustaWestland Project Zero hybrid tiltrotor/lift-fan unmanned technology demonstrator was actually built and flew successfully in 2011. It has side by side twin fans which can rotate into a vertical plane to act as propellers in forward flight, while still located within the wing structure.

The F-35 Lightning II uses the Rolls-Royce LiftSystem, in which 29,000 hp is diverted forward through a driveshaft from the engine's low-pressure (LP) turbine via a clutch and bevel-gearbox to a vertically mounted, contra-rotating lift fan located forward of the main engine.

Israeli enterprise Urban Aeronautics is developing a wingless drone that uses a pair of lift fans to ensure lift by ground effect and another pair of fans for forward flight.

== Table of lift fan aircraft ==
Type	Country	Date	Role	Status	Description
AgustaWestland Project Zero	Italy/United Kingdom	2011	Experimental	Prototype	2 tiltrotor–fans; hybrid tiltrotor–fan in-wing unmanned technology demonstrator
Avro Canada VZ-9 Avrocar	Canada	1958	Experimental	Prototype	1 central fan in circular flying saucer wing; 2 flown; trials 1958–61, never flew out of ground effect
Grumman Future Air Attack Vehicle (FAAV)	USA	1993	Fighter	Project	2 fans in wings
Hawker Siddeley HS 138	United Kingdom	1969	Strike fighter	Project	4 fans in wings
Hawker Siddeley P.1017	United Kingdom	1962	Fighter	Project	2 fans in nose, 2? in tail sections
Lockheed Martin F-35 Lightning II	USA		Fighter	In service	1 fan, F-35B variant only
Lockheed Martin VARIOUS	USA	2010		Project	2 fans; multi-role UAV
Moller M200X Volantor	USA	1989	Experimental	Prototype	8 fans in circular flying saucer wing
NASA wind tunnel test models	USA	1967	Transport	Project	Various designs
Northrop Grumman MUVR	USA	2011		Project	2 fans; ship-to-shore resupply aircraft
Pegasus VBJ	South Africa	2019	Business jet	Project	Fans in cranked dihedral wing, and at rear for thrust; 1/8-scale model flown, prototype due in 2020
Ray		2010		Project	4 unequal-size fans
Republic AP-100	USA	1957	Strike fighter	Project	3 fans in fuselage centre
Ryan XV-5 Vertifan	USA	1964	Experimental	Prototype	3 fans unequal-size; 2 craft built, 1 flew until 1971
Tactical Robotics Cormorant	Israel		Experimental	Prototype	UAV
Vanguard Omniplane: C2, C2D		1959	Experimental	Prototype	2 fans; tethered trials 1959–62
Verticraft Verticar	USA	1961	Experimental	Project	1 fan in flying wing lifting body; 1 prototype, failed to fly

== See also ==
- Lift jet
- VTOL
