= Tiltjet =

Aircraft propulsion configuration

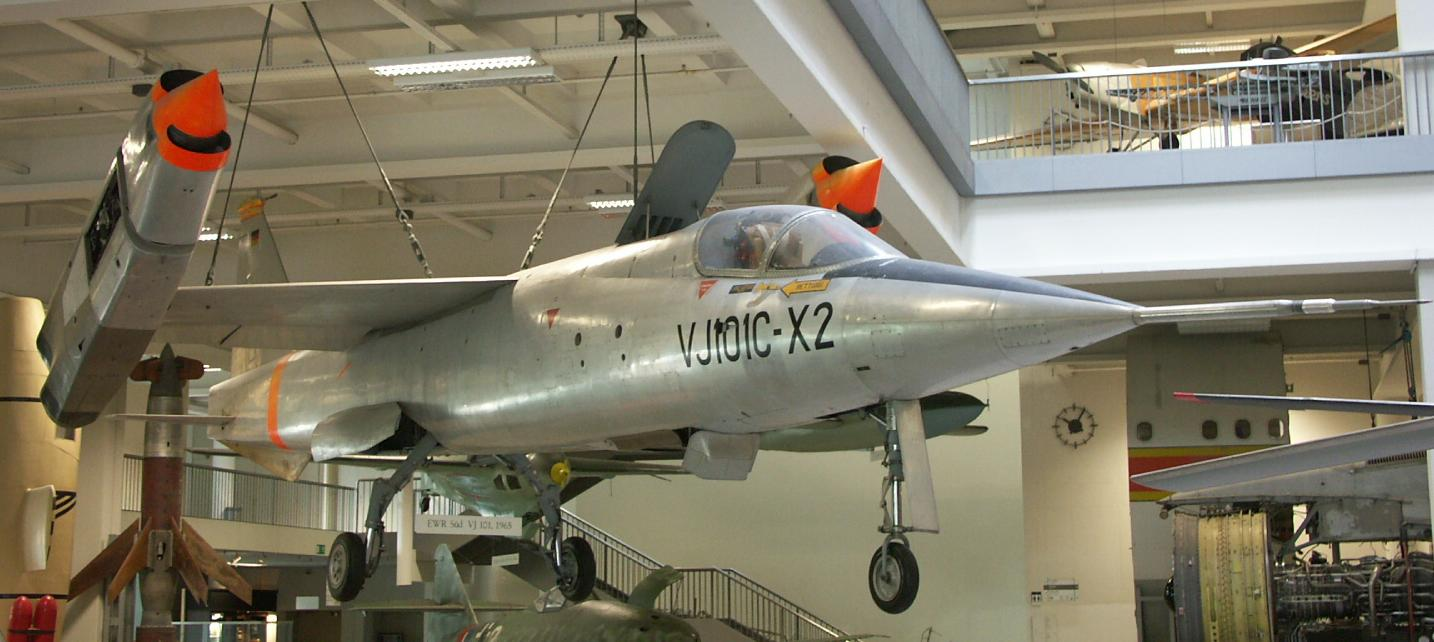
A preserved EWR VJ 101, an experimental tiltjet fighter

A tiltjet is an aircraft propulsion configuration that was historically tested for proposed vertical take-off and landing (VTOL)-capable fighters.

The tiltjet arrangement is, in concept, broadly similar to that of the tiltrotor; whereas a tiltrotor utilises pivotable rotors, the tiltjet employs jet engines capable of moving to angle their thrust between downwards and rearwards positions. A typical arrangement has the engines mounted on the wingtips, in which the entire propulsion system is rotated from axial to dorsal in order to achieve the transition from hover or vertical flight to horizontal. Aircraft of such a configuration are fully capable of performing VTOL operations, akin to a helicopter, as well as conducting high speed flights. However, the configuration has been restrained to experimental aircraft only, as other configurations for VTOL aircraft have been pursued instead.

== History ==
During the 1950s, rapid advances in the field of jet propulsion, particularly in terms of increased thrust and compact engine units, had contributed to an increased belief in the technical viability of vertical takeoff/landing (VTOL) aircraft, particularly within Western Europe and the United States. During 1950s and 1960s, multiple programmes in Britain, France, and the United States were initiated; likewise, aviation companies inside West Germany were keen not to be left out of this emerging technology. Shortly after 1957, the year in which the post-Second World War ban upon West Germany operating and developing combat aircraft was lifted, German aviation firms Dornier Flugzeugwerke, Heinkel, and Messerschmitt, having also been allowed to resume their own activities that same year, received an official request from the German Federal Government that urged them to perform investigative work on the topic of VTOL aircraft and to produce concept designs.

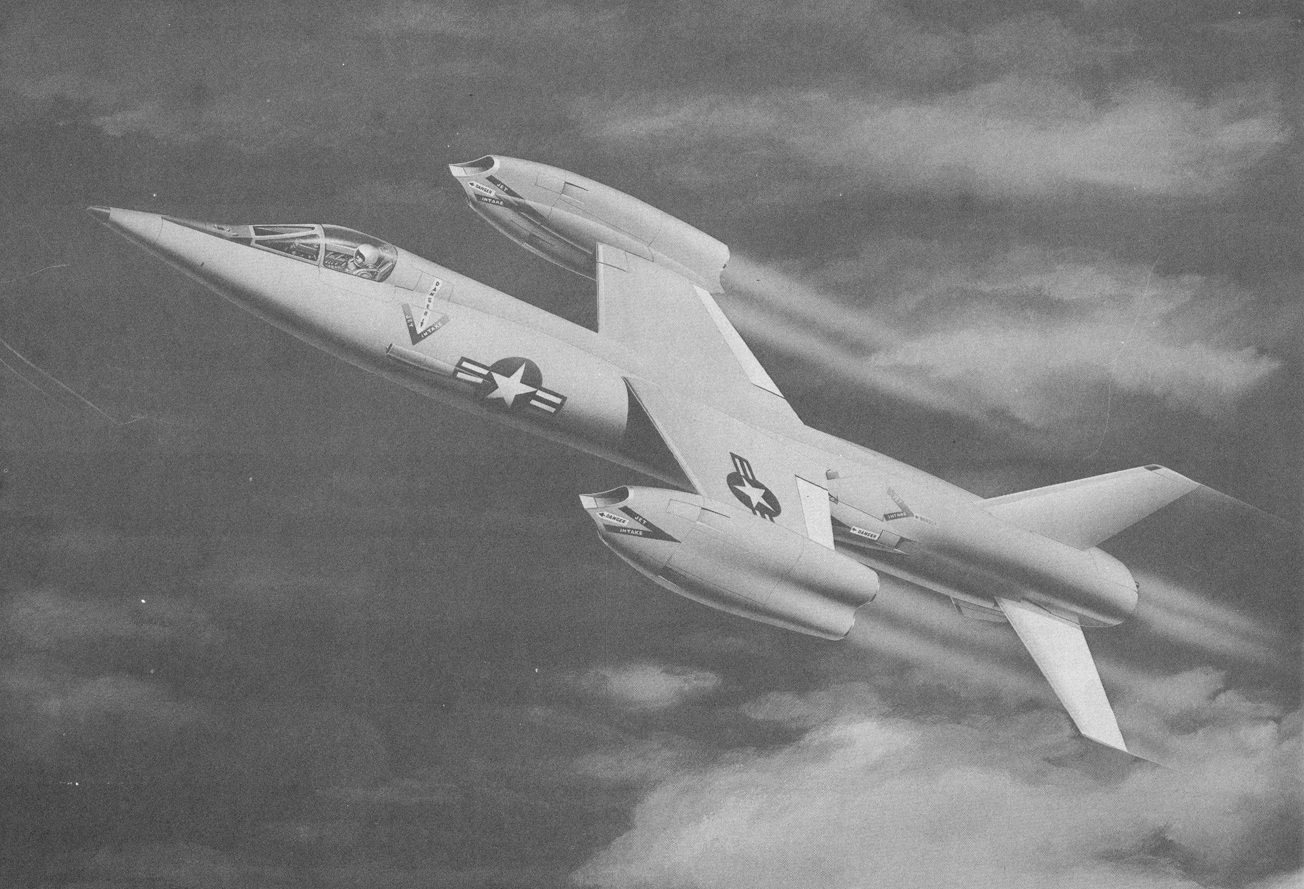
Artist's concept of the Bell XF-109 in flight

Around the same period, the American aviation company Bell Aircraft were investigating their own designs for VTOL performance. One proposal was the Bell D-188A, which was envisioned as a supersonic tiltjet fighter; however, it never progressed beyond the mockup stage. Another tiltjet platform designed by the company was the Bell 65 "Air Test Vehicle". Intended purely for experimental purposes, this one-of-a-kind aircraft made extensive use of existing general aviation components throughout to reduce its cost. Having performed its first hover on 16 November 1954, work with the Bell 65 was halted during the following year in favour of more advanced VTOL designs.

In West Germany, interest in developing a VTOL fighter aircraft had resulted in the development of the EWR VJ 101, a supersonic-capable VTOL tiltjet that entered flight testing during the 1960s. Its propulsion system, consisting of multiple Rolls-Royce RB145, a lightweight single-spool turbojet engine was developed as a collaborative effort between the British engine specialist Rolls-Royce Limited and the German engine manufacturer MAN Turbo. Its control systems, developed by American firm Honeywell and Germany company Bodenseewerk, performed various functions across the flight regime of the VJ 101 C, including attitude control during hover and the transition from hover to horizontal aerodynamic flight. The first prototype's maiden hovering flight occurred on 10 April 1963. However, the programme was restructured from being producing a successor to the German Air Force's fleet of Lockheed F-104 Starfighters to a broader research and development programme, aimed at exploring and validating the VJ 101's flight control concepts.

Akin to the fortunes of the tiltjets, various other projects of the era to develop supersonic-capable VTOL fighter aircraft, including the Mirage IIIV and the Hawker Siddeley P.1154 (a supersonic parallel to what would become the Hawker Siddeley Harrier, a subsonic VTOL combat aircraft that reached operational service), ultimately met similar fates. The Harrier jump jet and, substantially later, the Lockheed Martin F-35 Lightning II, has since demonstrated the potential of VTOL fighters.

== See also ==
- Thrust vectoring
- Tiltrotor
- Tiltwing
- Tailsitter
- VTOL
