= Bell Model 65 =

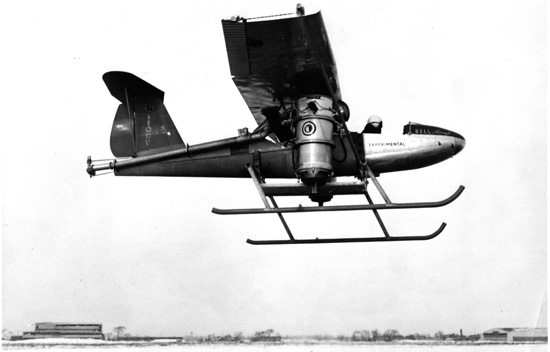

General information
- Type: VTOL aircraft
- National origin: United States of America
- Manufacturer: Bell
- Number built: 1

History
- First flight: January 1954

The Bell Model 65 Air Test Vehicle (ATV) is an experimental tiltjet VTOL aircraft built by Bell using parts from a number of general aviation aircraft.

== Design and development ==
Bell used the fuselage of a Schweizer 1-23 glider with the wing of a Cessna 170 and the landing gear of a Bell 47 helicopter.

Two 1,000 lbf (4.4 kN) thrust Fairchild J44 turbojet engines - as used on drones, missiles and for JATO - were mounted one on each side of the aircraft under the wing. These could be tilted from horizontal to vertical. A Turbomeca Palouste turbocompressor powered small thrusters at the tail and wingtips to provide a reaction control system during hover.

The aircraft made its first hover on 16 November 1954. This was performed with the aircraft raised on a platform to avoid the reingestion of its exhaust gases. Wheeled landing gear - from a Cessna - was added to the aircraft, which went on to make horizontal flights in 1955. It proved able to make partial conversions at altitude, however it lacked sufficient engine thrust to complete the transition.

The Model 65 programme was ended in 1955 to allow development of the Bell X-14, however the tiltjet experience gained was used to develop the U S Air Force Bell XF-109 V/STOL fighter concept.

The Model 65 is currently in storage at the Smithsonian National Air and Space Museum Paul E. Garber Preservation, Restoration, and Storage Facility in Suitland, Maryland.

== See also ==
- List of VTOL aircraft
