= Paul Moller =

Canadian engineer (born 1936)

Paul Sandner Moller (born December 11, 1936, in Fruitvale, British Columbia, Canada) is a Canadian engineer who has spent over fifty years developing the Moller Skycar personal vertical takeoff and landing (VTOL) vehicle. The engine technology developed for the Skycar has also been adapted as a UAV platform called the "aerobot". The rotapower engine itself has been spun off to a separate Moller company, Freedom Motors.

== Education ==
Moller holds several degrees and certifications:

- D.A.M. (Diploma Aircraft Maintenance), Provincial Institute of Technology and Art, 1957
- D.A.E. (Diploma Aeronautical Engineering), Provincial Institute of Technology and Art 1958
- Master of Engineering, McGill University, 1961
- Ph.D. in Aerodynamics, McGill University, 1963

== Career ==
In 1972, Moller founded Supertrapp Industries to market his invention of an engine silencing system. Moller sold Supertrapp in 1988 in order to fund development of his Skycar and its rotapower engine.

In 2003, the Securities and Exchange Commission sued Moller for civil fraud (Securities And Exchange Commission v. Moller International, Inc., and Paul S. Moller, Defendants) in connection with value of shares after the initial public offering of stock, and for making unsubstantiated claims about the performance of the Skycar. Moller settled this lawsuit without admitting guilt by agreeing to a permanent injunction against claiming projected worth of Moller International stock and paying US$50,000. The shareholders of Moller International - collectively known as SOMI ("Shareholders Of Moller International") banded together on a website (no longer active) to tell the Moller-side of the SEC issue.

Moller was a professor of Mechanical and Aeronautical Engineering, from 1963 to 1975, at the University of California, Davis and lives in Davis. He was featured in Popular Science's January 2005 issue and appeared on the radio show Coast To Coast AM.

In 2007, Moller announced that the M200G Volantor, a successor to the Moller Skycar, would hopefully be on the market in the United States by early 2008. His proposed Autovolantor model includes an all-electric version powered by Altairnano batteries.

Moller is President of Aerobotics Incorporated, a wholly owned subsidiary of Moller International, which designed an aerial system for video inspection of bridges, for Caltrans. The project was suspended in 2008 after significant issues were identified with the test design.

Moller's credibility has been questioned in recent years because of the vaporware nature of his creations. In April 2009, the National Post characterized the Moller M400 Skycar as a 'failure', and described the Moller company as "no longer believable enough to gain investors".

On May 18, 2009, Moller filed for personal protection under the Chapter 11 reorganization provisions of the federal bankruptcy law, however Moller International (corporation) did not file for bankruptcy and continues to do business as of October 24, 2013.

By 2009, Moller International had accumulated a deficit of $43.1 million.

In December 2020, A Moller International newsletter explained that the company remains inactive while waiting for Rotapower motor production in India.

In June of 2023, Moller published a newsletter on his blog discussing the forthcoming sale of 300 million additional shares and conversion of a limited amount of shares from Moller International to its sister company Freedom Motors. The newsletter also discusses the benefits of hybrid power systems, where batteries and electric motors are supplemented by Rotapower engines as range extenders.

== Media appearances ==
- Father of the Flying Car (2022)
- 2057 : "The Body" (2007)
- Future Fantastic (1996)
- Mythbusters (2005)
- Secrets of the Gods (The Force Beyond) (1977)

== See also ==
- Moller Skycar
- M200G Volantor
- Moller M200X
- Flying car
