= General Electric X353-5 =

X353-5
- Type: Liftfan
- Manufacturer: GE Aviation
- Major applications: Ryan XV-5 Vertifan

The General Electric X353-5 was an unusual, high bypass ratio, liftfan system developed for the Ryan XV-5 Vertifan V/STOL research aircraft (known earlier as the VZ-11). Two General Electric J85-5 turbojets were used for propulsion in wing-borne flight. During lift, the exhaust from these turbojets was diverted through ducting to a pair of vertically mounted turbine/fan units buried in the aircraft wings (one in the starboard wing, the other in the port wing). These turbine/fan units were similar in concept to the aft fan units on the General Electric CJ805 -23, the main difference being that the turbine blades of the X353-5 were outboard of the fan, rather than inboard. Each engine supplied half the exhaust gas needed to drive each fan unit. A cross-over duct kept both fans turning uniformly in the event of either engine failing. The aircraft also had a smaller turbine/fan mounted in the aircraft nose, which was used to control pitch. This pitch fan was similar in design to the main fan units and utilised 10.5% of the gas generator exhaust gas flow. Beneath each fan was a series of spanwise exit louvres, ganged together, which were used to vector the fan thrust in lift mode. Effectively, the bypass ratio was 12.16:1 in lift mode.

== See also ==
- Rolls-Royce LiftSystem

Related development

- General Electric TF39
- General Electric CJ805-23

Related lists

- List of aircraft engines
