= Moller M200G Volantor =

Hovercraft prototype designed by Paul Moller

M200G Volantor
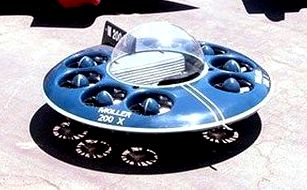
- Moller M200X

General information
- Type: Flying car (aircraft)
- Manufacturer: Moller International
- Designer: Paul Moller
- Status: Development Inactive

The M200G Neuera is a prototype of a flying saucer-style hovercraft, designed by aeronautics engineer Paul Moller. The vehicle is envisioned as a precursor to the Moller M400 Skycar. The M200G Volantor uses a system of eight computer-controlled fans to hover up to 10 feet (3 m) above the ground. Volantor is a term coined by Moller meaning "a vertical takeoff and landing aircraft." Moller International is apparently inactive as of 2020.

== Design ==
The M200 is a design for a VTOL personal air vehicle, a class of vehicle described by Moller as a "volantor".

The M200G Neuera is a circular craft with seats in the middle for two passengers and a control panel. The vehicle is 3 feet (0.91 meters) tall and 10 feet (3.0 meters) in diameter. Eight Wankel rotary engines power eight enclosed fans. The fans allow for vertical take-off and landing and, once the vehicle is aloft, rely upon the ground effect to create a cushion of air that the vehicle sits upon while flying. The eight separate engines exist for redundancy, allowing the craft to continue flying if one engine goes out. If two engines go out, the craft will make a "survivable hard landing". The engines can be powered with gasoline, diesel or ethanol fuels. In 2023 was announced an electric and hybrid version would be possible.

The computer system monitors stability and the vehicle has only two controls, one for speed and direction and the other for altitude. The computer system also prevents the machine from flying higher than 10 feet (3 m) above the ground. Per Federal Aviation Administration regulations, any vehicle which flies above 10 feet is regulated as an aircraft. The M200G Neuera is expected to be capable of travel over any terrain at speeds up to 50 mph (80 km/h).

Moller intends to design smaller aircraft to conform with the FAA Light-sport aircraft category, among them a 200LS and 100LS.

== History ==
Paul Moller, the vehicle's inventor, has been working on flying saucer projects since the 1960s, having first been given the idea when studying radial diffusers. He promoted his Discojet project in 1974, with target certification and production dates in 1976. Featuring eight Wankel snowmobile engines, a central bubble and a low tail fin, photographs of a mock-up were published in 1976. The Discojet never appeared, although the later M200X closely resembles it.

None has yet come to market and news reports have been skeptical that the latest M200G vehicle will fare any better, citing a case by the Securities and Exchange Commission which noted that in 1997 promotional materials for the Skycar had predicted 10,000 units sold by 2002.

Moller and his team claim that over 200 test flights of the M200G Neuera have already been conducted, though these flights rely on ground effect and do not necessarily suggest significant movement toward the goals set forth for the flagship model, the Skycar M400. Moller had predicted they would have the M200G ready for sale by early 2008 with a goal of 250 units produced in the year, but this did not occur. Depending upon demand, the M200G could cost under US$100,000 according to the company. As of August 2007, Moller had not yet established if the vehicle will be regulated by the United States Federal Aviation Administration or the Department of Transportation.

A Moller International newsletter published in December 2020 explains that the company remains inactive while waiting for Rotapower motor production in India.

As of 2025, the last update provided by Moller International is a June 2023 newsletter published to their blog which mainly discussed the company's newly obtained ability to sell 300 million additional shares of their company, as well as its legal permission to have a limited amount of share conversions from Moller International shares, to shares of its sister company Freedom Motors. Aside from that financial discussion, the newsletter outlines the benefit of converting to a hybrid power system, where batteries and electric motors are supplemented by the company's Rotapower engines as range extenders.

== Criticism ==
In a 2005 episode of the Discovery Channel television show MythBusters it was reported that more than US$200 million had gone into the development of the Skycar. Moller has been claiming to be attempting to build a flying car since 1974, constantly promising delivery dates that are just "around the corner" but the closest Moller has come to producing a vehicle that flies is the M200G Neuera, which has been demonstrated to hover outside of ground effect. He has not produced any evidence or figures to support the promised abilities, such as fuel economy equivalent to that of an automobile; indeed, each proposed model would use eight less fuel-efficient but very good weight to power ratio Wankel engines, each of which must maintain high RPMs even when idle. The only demonstration approaching flight was a "hover" test performed by a Skycar prototype that was tethered, not hung, to a crane, which Moller claimed was "for insurance purposes". Each time the deadline approaches, Moller has postponed it. For example, since 2003, when he started taking presale deposits for the flagship model M400, the date for FAA certification promised to investors and buyers has been moved forward one year each year, and lastly stood at December 31, 2008. In 2003, the Securities and Exchange Commission sued Moller for civil fraud (Securities And Exchange Commission v. Moller International, Inc., and Paul S. Moller, Defendants) in connection with the sale of unregistered stock, and for making unsubstantiated claims about the performance of the company's flagship M400 Skycar. Moller settled this lawsuit by agreeing to a permanent injunction and paying $50,000. In the words of the SEC complaint, "As of late 2002, MI's approximately 40 years' of development has resulted in a prototype Skycar capable of hovering about fifteen feet [4.5 m] above the ground."

== Variants ==
Discojet
An early 1970s design, never advanced beyond the mock-up stage.
M200X
The prototype M200. Moller claims a performance of 100 mph (160 km/h), 900 miles (1,400 km) range, 8 low-emissions Wankel engines that run on a 70% (bio)ethanol and 30% water mixture; earlier models ran on gasoline. The ethanol/water fuel mixture reduces fire hazards, as it does not easily burn outside the engines. The water cools the engines from within, and the engines can use higher compression ratios and hereby make more power than with 100% ethanol. Because of the mixture, the engine fulfills California SULEV requirements.
M200G Neuera
The planned production version of the M200. It is reputed to be certified for flight above the FAA 10-foot altitude restriction.
Firefly
Designed as a high-rise rescue vehicle, which would carry up to 3 passengers and 1 operator.

== Specifications ==
Data from

General characteristics

- Crew: 2
- Capacity: 350 lbs
- Length: 10 ft (3.0 m)
- Wingspan: 10 ft (3.0 m)
- Height: 3 ft (0.91 m)
- Powerplant: 8 × Rotapower 550 Wankel rotary engine

Performance

- Maximum speed: 100 mph (160 km/h, 87 kn)
- Cruise speed: 75 mph (121 km/h, 65 kn)
- Range: 100 mi (160 km, 87 nmi)
- Service ceiling: 10 ft (3.0 m)
