= Ryan XV-5 Vertifan =

American experimental VTOL aircraft

XV-5 Vertifan
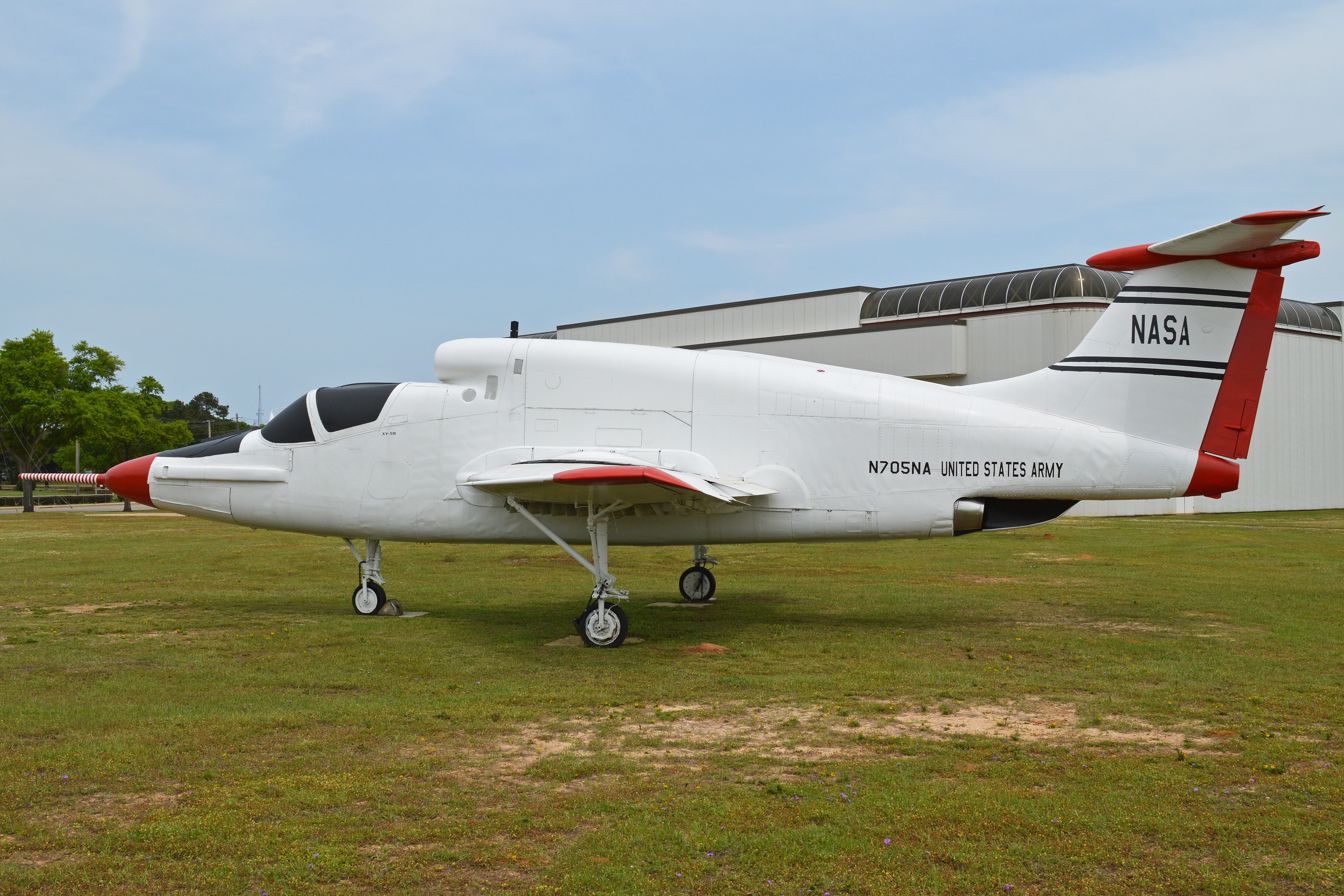
- XV-5B at the United States Army Aviation Museum

General information
- Type: VTOL experimental aircraft
- Manufacturer: Ryan Aeronautical
- Status: Retired
- Primary users: United States Army NASA
- Number built: 2

History
- First flight: 25 May 1964

The Ryan XV-5 Vertifan was a jet-powered V/STOL experimental aircraft in the 1960s. The United States Army (US Army) commissioned the Ryan VZ-11-RY (re-designated XV-5A in 1962) in 1961, along with the Lockheed VZ-10 Hummingbird (re-designated XV-4 in 1962). It successfully proved the concept of ducted lift fans, but the project was cancelled after multiple fatal crashes unrelated to the lift system.

== Design ==
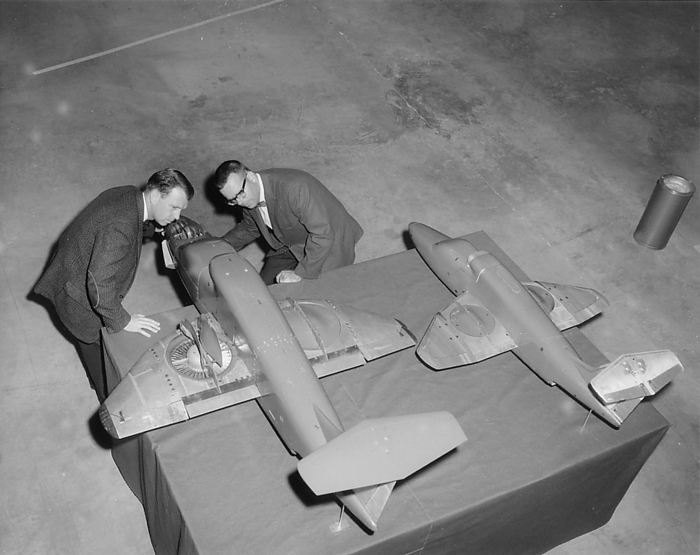
XV-5A Models

The XV-5 was powered by two 2,658 lbf (11.8 kN) thrust General Electric J85-GE-5 turbojets. General Electric X353-5 Lift-fans in the wings and a smaller fan in the nose, powered by engine exhaust gas, were used for Vertical Take-Off and Landing (VTOL). The 62.5 in (1.59 m) diameter lift fan in each wing had a hinged cover on the upper wing surface which was opened for VTOL. The 36 in (0.91 m) nose fan provided adequate pitch control but produced adverse handling characteristics. The fans provided vertical lift of approximately 16,000 lbf (71.2 kN), nearly three times the thrust of the engines as turbojets.

A set of louvered vanes underneath each of the wing fans could vector the thrust fore and aft and provided yaw control. The engine power setting determined the lift from the fans, as fan RPM was determined by the exhaust output from the J85 engines and the load on the fan. Roll control was by differential actuation of the wing-fan exit louvers.

Aircraft performance was subsonic, with delta wings superficially similar to those on the Douglas A-4 Skyhawk. The Vertifan had an unusual intake position above the two-seat side-by-side seating cockpit, and a T-tail.

The XV-5A was finished in Army green and the XV-5B was painted in white NASA colors. The fans did not generate as much thrust as was hoped, and the vertical-horizontal flight transition was difficult and abrupt. The XV-5 would be one of the last crewed aircraft designed and built by Ryan, which mainly manufactured drones after the mid-1960s.

The XV-5 was one of many dozens of aircraft which attempted to produce a successful vertical takeoff aircraft, but the lift fan system was heavy and occupied considerable internal volume. Only the Hawker Siddeley Harrier would still be operational by the turn of the 21st century, as would technology to make possible the use of a shaft-driven fan in the Lockheed Martin F-35B.

=== Propulsion system ===
The J85 and lift-fan combination was a precursor to developments which led to the first GE high BPR engine, the TF-39. The lift fans were driven by turbine blades mounted around the periphery of the fan, with mass flow 13 times greater than the gas generators mass flow and increased thrust 3 times over that available using a propelling nozzle.

After demonstrating that large amounts of air could be moved through a lift fan, an 80 in (2.0 m) tip drive fan turned through 90 degrees, driven by a more powerful J79 engine, was built to demonstrate an efficient cruise fan. The concept of a large diameter cruise fan was incorporated in the General Electric TF39 engine, used on the Lockheed C-5 Galaxy.

== Operational history ==
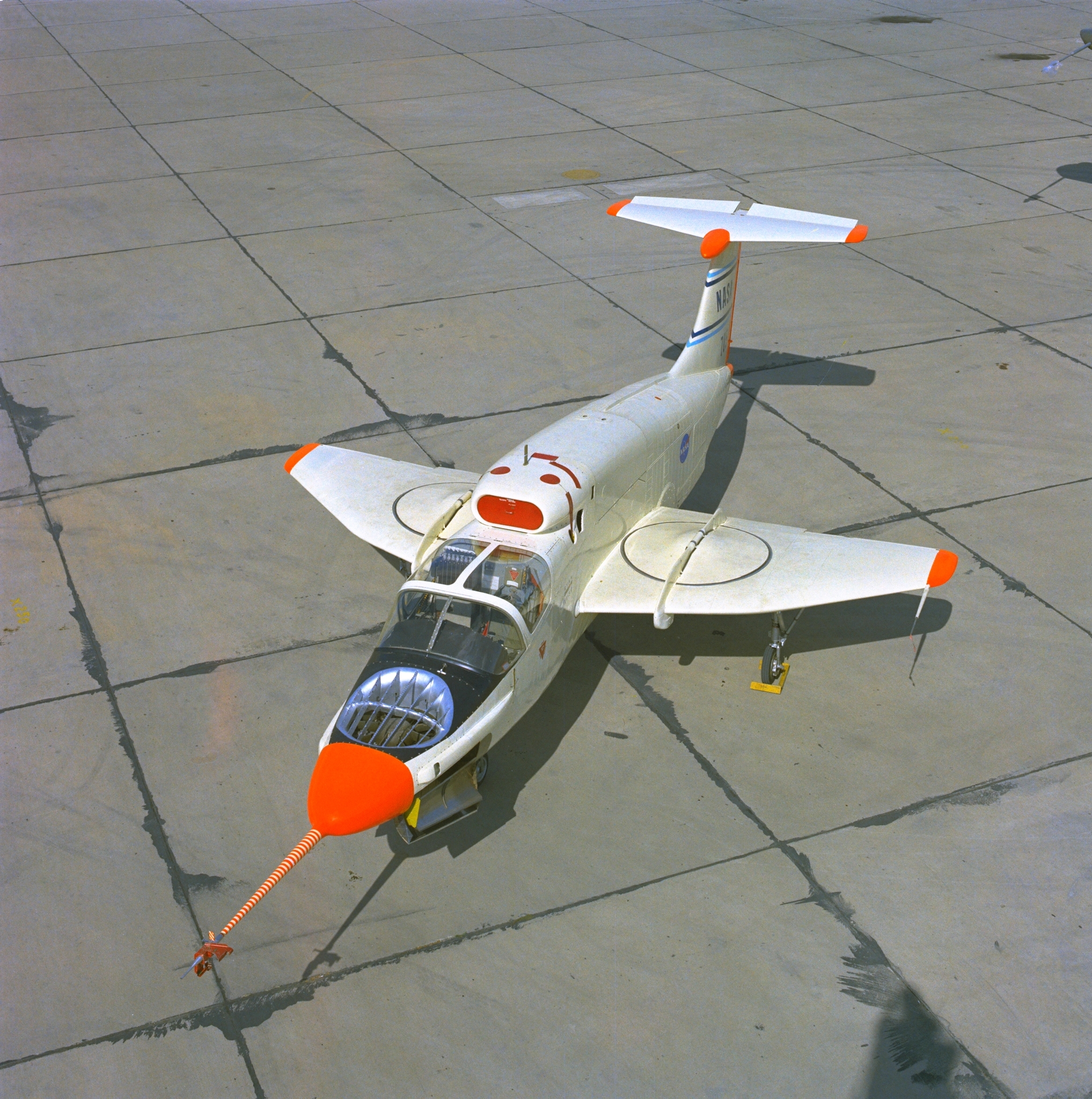
XV-5B

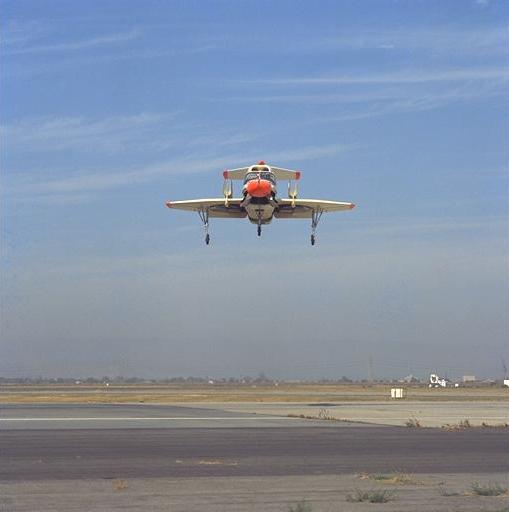
XV-5B

Two 12,500 lb (maximum gross weight) XV-5A were evaluated in late 1966 by fifteen test pilots (the "XV-5A Fan Club"). One was destroyed in a crash during a public flight demonstration on 27 April 1965, killing Ryan test pilot Lou Everett. The crash investigation believed that the pilot had inadvertently tripped the conventional-to-vertical conversion switch (improperly mounted on the collective), which auto-programmed the horizontal stabilizer to force the nose down almost 45 degrees. (This was to compensate for the lift generated by the nose fan.) Everett initiated a low-altitude rocket ejection, but the ejection seat was improperly rigged and he was killed. As a result of this accident, the conversion switch was changed to a lift-lock toggle and relocated on the main instrument panel ahead of the collective lever control.

The aircraft was difficult to control during landing for several reasons. Yaw control was provided by changing the angle of the lift fans in opposing directions, but this proved to have far too little yaw control for precise low speed handling. The duct doors also caused difficulty with control, as even at low speeds opening them caused significant changes in pitch. The aircraft also suffered from very poor acceleration during standard runway takeoffs.

Tests and promotional materials proposed a rescue version that could winch a person into a compartment behind the pilots. The second aircraft was extensively damaged on 5 October 1966 during trials as a rescue aircraft, when a suspended "horse collar" survivor sling was ingested into a wing fan. The pilot, Major David H. Tittle, was fatally injured as a result of the ejection seat propelling him out of the craft after it had hit the concrete airport surface, although it was judged that the fan actually still functioned well enough to continue controlled flight. The second aircraft was rebuilt as the modified XV-5B, with tests continuing until 1971. This XV-5B airframe is currently in storage at the United States Army Aviation Museum, Fort Rucker, Alabama.

Although the program was cancelled, the ducted fan concept had been judged successful and several follow up programs were proposed. The ducted fans were considered very quiet for their time, and were capable of operating from standard surface materials. Other VTOL aircraft often require protective mats to avoid damaging ground surfaces with their exhaust. This is not a problem with the much cooler exhaust from ducted fans.

== Variants ==
XV-5A
Two aircraft built in the initial build standard.
XV-5B
The second XV-5A re-built after a fatal crash with improved controls, fixed wide-track undercarriage and up-rated lift/propulsion systems.

== Specifications (XV-5) (performance estimated) ==
Data from Jane's All The World's Aircraft 1965–66

General characteristics

- Crew: 2
- Length: 44 ft 6 in (13.56 m)
- Wingspan: 29 ft 10 in (9.09 m)
- Height: 14 ft 9 in (4.5 m)
- Wing area: 260.3 sq ft (24.18 m^{2})
- Empty weight: 7,541 lb (3,421 kg)
- Max takeoff weight: 13,600 lb (6,169 kg) (conventional takeoff), 12,300 lb (5,579.2 kg) (VTOL)
- Powerplant: 2 × General Electric J85-GE-5 turbojet, 2,658 lbf (11.82 kN) thrust each giving horizontal thrust and powering
  - 2 x 62.5 in (1.59 m) General Electric X353-5 lift fans
  - 1 x 36 in (0.91 m) General Electric X353-5 lift fan

Performance

- Maximum speed: 475 kn (547 mph, 880 km/h)
- Range: 870 nmi (1,000 mi, 1,600 km)
- Service ceiling: 40,000 ft (12,000 m)
- Rate of climb: 8,000 ft/min (41 m/s)

== See also ==
Aircraft of comparable role, configuration, and era

- Lockheed XV-4 Hummingbird

Related lists

- List of military aircraft of the United States
- List of VTOL aircraft
