= Bell D-188A =

Proposed American fighter (cancelled 1961)

D-188A (XF-109 / XF3L)
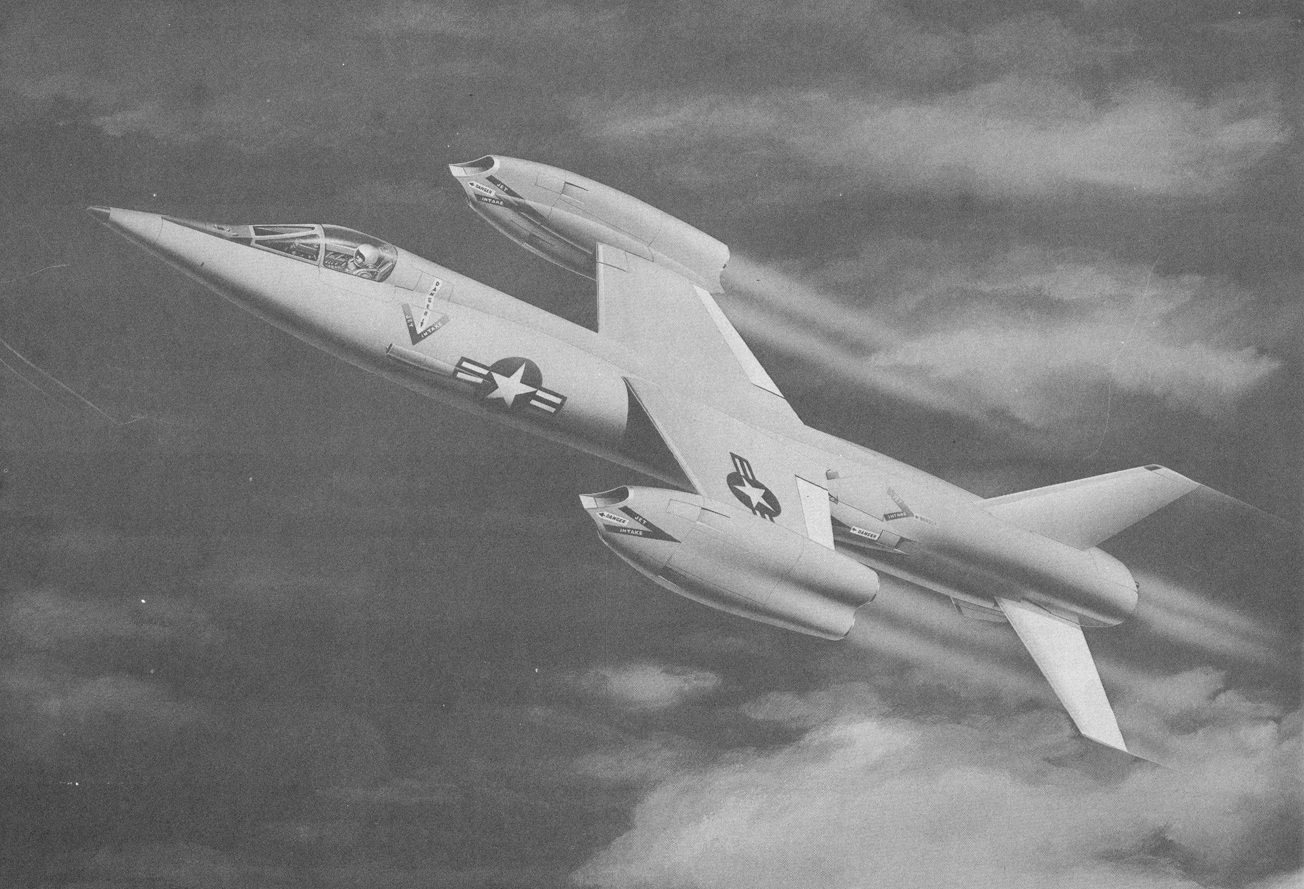
- Artist's concept of the XF-109 in flight

General information
- Type: VTOL fighter
- Manufacturer: Bell Aircraft Corporation
- Status: Canceled 1961
- Primary users: United States Air Force United States Navy
- Number built: 1 mockup

The Bell D-188A (unofficial military designations XF-109/XF3L) was a proposed eight-engine Mach 2–capable vertical take-off and landing (VTOL) tiltjet fighter that never proceeded past the mock-up stage.

== Development ==
In 1955, Bell Aircraft was requested by both the USAF and the US Navy to develop a VTOL/STOVL supersonic, all-weather fighter-bomber and defence interceptor. The project was highly ambitious and was designed to fulfill a multitude of roles for two different services. The aircraft was designated the Model 2000, and was offered in two different versions – the D-188 for the Navy and the D-188A for the Air Force. Bell had rather optimistically called the Navy version the XF3L-1 and the Air Force version the XF-109, although neither of these designations were official. In 1959, Bell teamed with Convair to form a joint weapon systems management team in order to push the XF-109 program. On 5 December 1960, Bell publicly showed off the design as the XF-109 – the Air Force version, as the Navy had lost interest the year earlier, however in the spring of 1961, the US Air Force canceled the program and no examples were built.

=== Designation ===
The military designations were not official and were speculative on the part of Bell. The Navy's XF3L-1 was not assigned, but would have been the D-188's designation had the aircraft been built, as this was the next in the US Navy's number series. The Air Force XF-109 designation had previously been assigned to a proposed Convair F-106B variant, however, had subsequently been left blank and Bell assumed – if the D-188A had been built – that this would have been assigned to the aircraft. Many reference works refer to the D-188A by its assumed experimental series number, but in fact the XF-109 designator was never assigned.

== Design ==
The aircraft was unconventional, and consisted of a long, thin, area ruled fuselage with a large fin and all-moving stabilators in the tail. The single seat cockpit was in the extreme nose and the small-span wing was mounted high on the fuselage. At the ends of each wing were pods that contained two turbojets each. These pods were designed to swivel through an arc of 100° (horizontal to 10° past vertical) to allow for both horizontal and vertical flight. To take off vertically, the pods were rotated to direct the engine's thrust downward, while for horizontal flight the pods were rotated back to the horizontal. The pods were capable of directing thrust slightly forward as well for enhanced landing maneuvers. In addition to the four wing engines, four engines were also mounted in the fuselage – two in the rear directed out of two separate tail ducts, and two liftjets directly aft of the cockpit and positioned vertically to aid in VTOL operation, exhausting out of two ventral ducts. The D-188A featured an engine bleed system to assist in vertical lift and maneuvering. Bleed air from the fuselage engine compressors would have been directed to a pair of thrusters in the nose and two more in the tail to aid in pitch, roll and yaw movements.

Armament would have consisted of two 20mm cannon in the fuselage, an internal weapons bay and eight wing hard points for missiles and other ordnance.

== Specifications (D-188A, as designed) ==
Data from National Museum of the USAF factsheet.

General characteristics

- Crew: 1
- Length: 62 ft 0 in (18.90 m)
- Wingspan: 23 ft 9 in (7.24 m)
- Height: 12 ft 9 in (3.89 m)
- Wing area: 194 sq ft (18.02 m^{2})
- Empty weight: 13,800 lb (6,260 kg)
- Gross weight: 23,917 lb (10,849 kg)
- Powerplant: 8 × General Electric J85-GE-5 turbojets, 2,600 lbf (12 kN) thrust each

Performance

- Maximum speed: Mach 2.3
- Range: 2,300 mi (3,900 km, 2,000 nmi)
- Combat range: 1,350 mi (2,170 km, 1,170 nmi)
- Service ceiling: 60,000 ft (18,000 m)
- Thrust/weight: 0.87

Armament

- Guns: 4 × 20 mm (0.79 in) cannon
- Rockets: 108 × 2.75 in (70 mm) rockets
- Bombs: 4,000 lb (1,800 kg)

== See also ==
Aircraft of comparable role, configuration, and era

- Avro Canada TS-140
- EWR VJ 101
- Hawker Siddeley P.1154

Related lists

- List of fighter aircraft
- List of military aircraft of the United States
