= Hawker Siddeley P.1017 =

1960s British proposed VTOl strike fighter

P.1017

General information
- Type: Fighter aircraft
- Manufacturer: Hawker Siddeley
- Status: Cancelled

The Hawker Siddeley P.1017 was a proposed RAF/Fleet Air Arm VTOL capable strike fighter concept.

== Development ==
In 1962, Hawker-Siddeley developed a design for the P.1017 short/vertical take-off and landing carrier-based attack aircraft to possibly replace or complement the Blackburn Buccaneer aircraft. The design was to use variable-sweep wings, lift engines installed in the nose/tail sections of the fuselage, and main engine nacelles with a nozzle that could deviate to change the thrust vectoring. The aircraft had a T-shaped tail, although a version with a V-tail was also developed.
