= V/STOL =

Aircraft takeoff and landing class

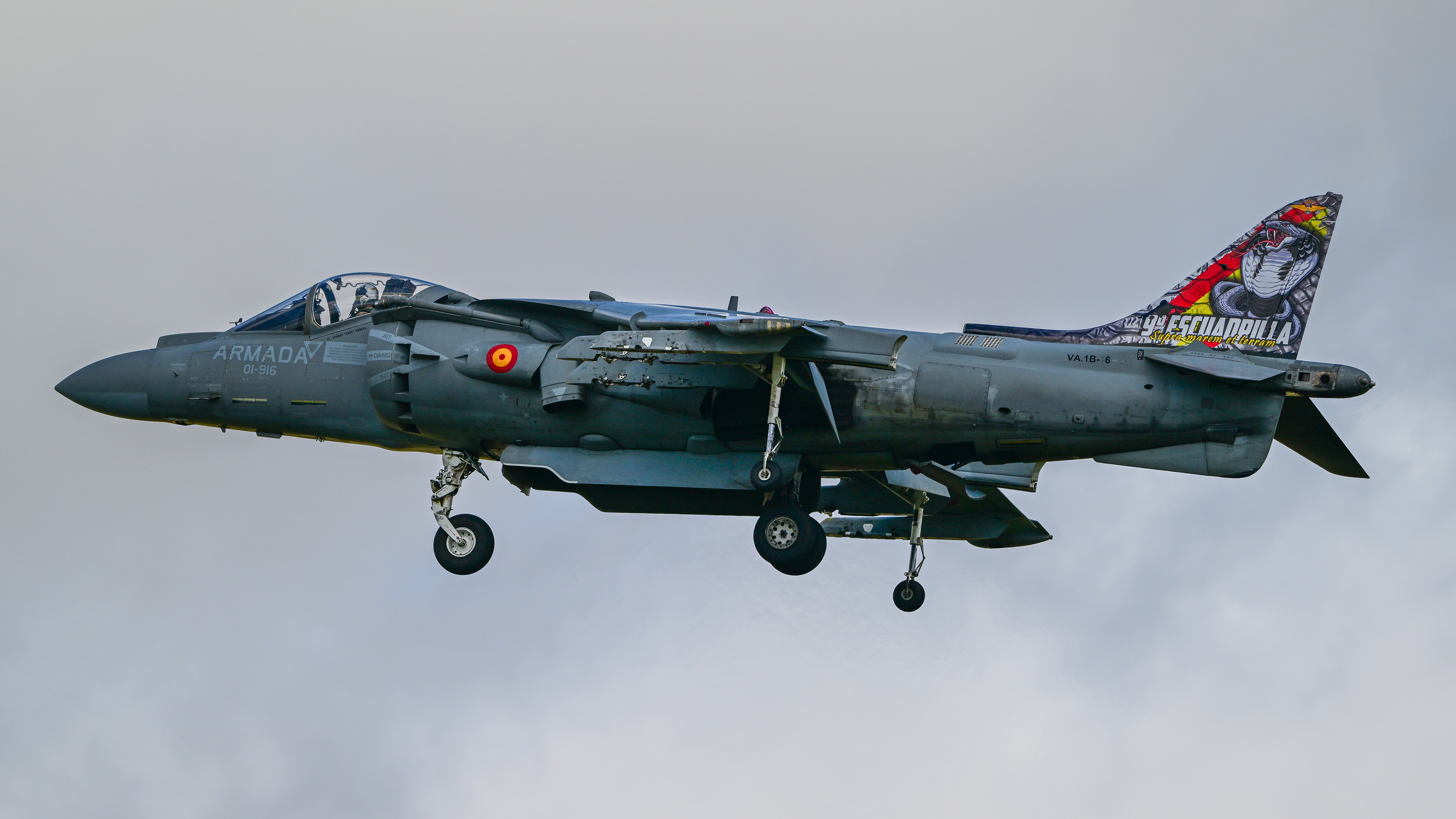
Spanish Navy AV-8B Harrier II at the RIAT 2023

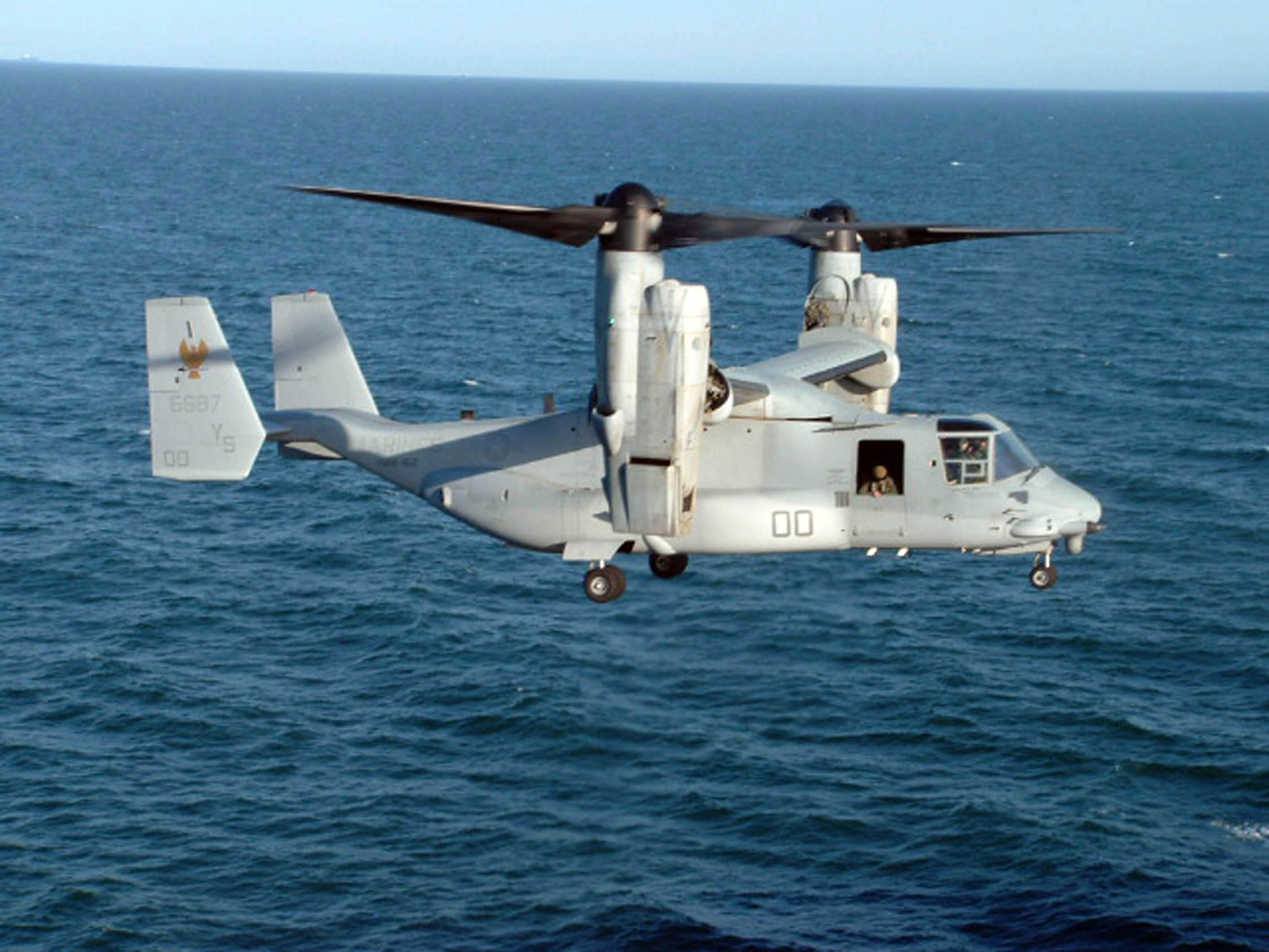
A U.S. Marine Corps MV-22 Osprey prepares to land aboard a ship.

A vertical and/or short take-off and landing (V/STOL) aircraft is an airplane able to take off or land vertically or on short runways. Vertical takeoff and landing (VTOL) aircraft are a subset of V/STOL craft that do not require runways at all. Generally, a V/STOL aircraft needs to be able to hover. Helicopters are not considered under the V/STOL classification as the classification is only used for aeroplanes, aircraft that achieve lift in forward flight by planing the air, thereby achieving speed and fuel efficiency that is typically greater than the capability of helicopters.

The main advantage of V/STOL aircraft is in their military performance, such as closer basing to the enemy, which reduces response time and tanker support requirements. In the case of the Falklands War, it also permitted high-performance fighter air cover and ground attack without a large aircraft carrier equipped with aircraft catapult. V/STOL was developed to allow fast jets to be operated from clearings in forests, from very short runways, and from small aircraft carriers that would previously only have been able to carry helicopters.

A rolling takeoff, sometimes with a ramp (ski-jump), reduces the amount of thrust required to lift an aircraft from the ground (compared with vertical takeoff), and hence increases the payload and range that can be achieved for a given thrust. For instance, the Harrier is incapable of taking off vertically with full weapons and fuel load. Hence V/STOL aircraft generally use a runway if it is available. In other words, short takeoff and vertical landing (STOVL) or conventional takeoff and landing (CTOL) operation is preferred to vertical takeoff and landing (VTOL) operation.

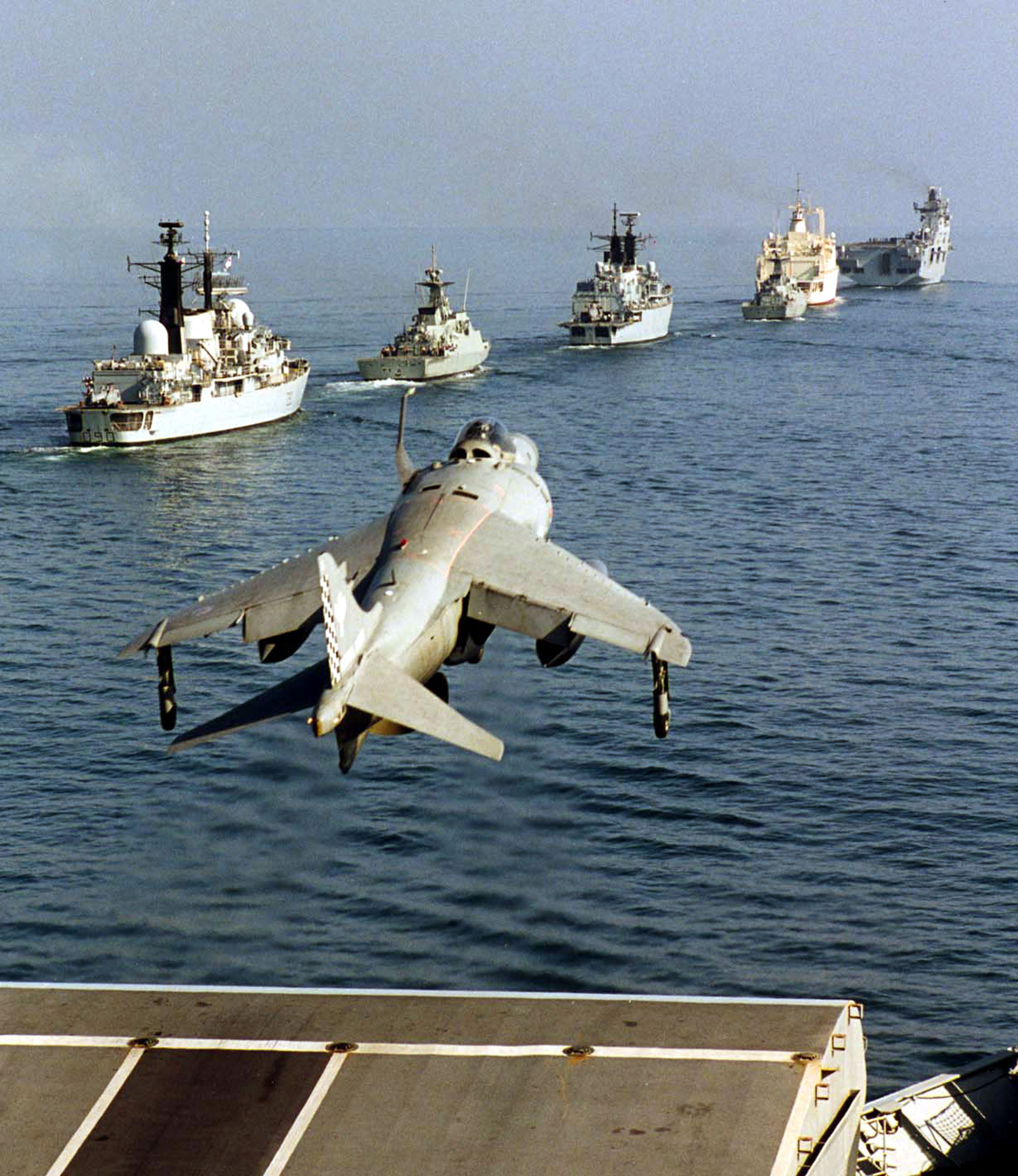
A Sea Harrier launches from the flight deck of HMS Illustrious in 2001

On aircraft carriers, non-catapult-assisted fixed-wing short takeoffs are accomplished with the use of thrust vectoring, which may also be used in conjunction with a runway "ski-jump". There are 16 aircraft carriers that operate these STOVL aircraft: United States (9), Japan (2), United Kingdom (2), Italy (2), and Spain (1). Use of STOVL tends to allow aircraft to carry a larger payload compared to vertical take-off and landing (VTOL), while still only requiring a short runway. The most famous examples are the Hawker Siddeley Harrier and the BAE Sea Harrier. Although technically a V/STOL aircraft, they are operationally STOVL aircraft due to the extra weight carried at take-off for fuel and armaments. The same is true of the B variant of the Lockheed Martin F-35 Lightning II, which demonstrated VTOL capability in test flights but is operationally a STOVL.

== VTOL ==
Vertical take-off and landing (VTOL) is a subset of V/STOL. This classification can include a variety of types of aircraft as well as thrust-vectoring fixed-wing aircraft and other hybrid aircraft with powered rotors such as cyclogyros and gyrodynes.

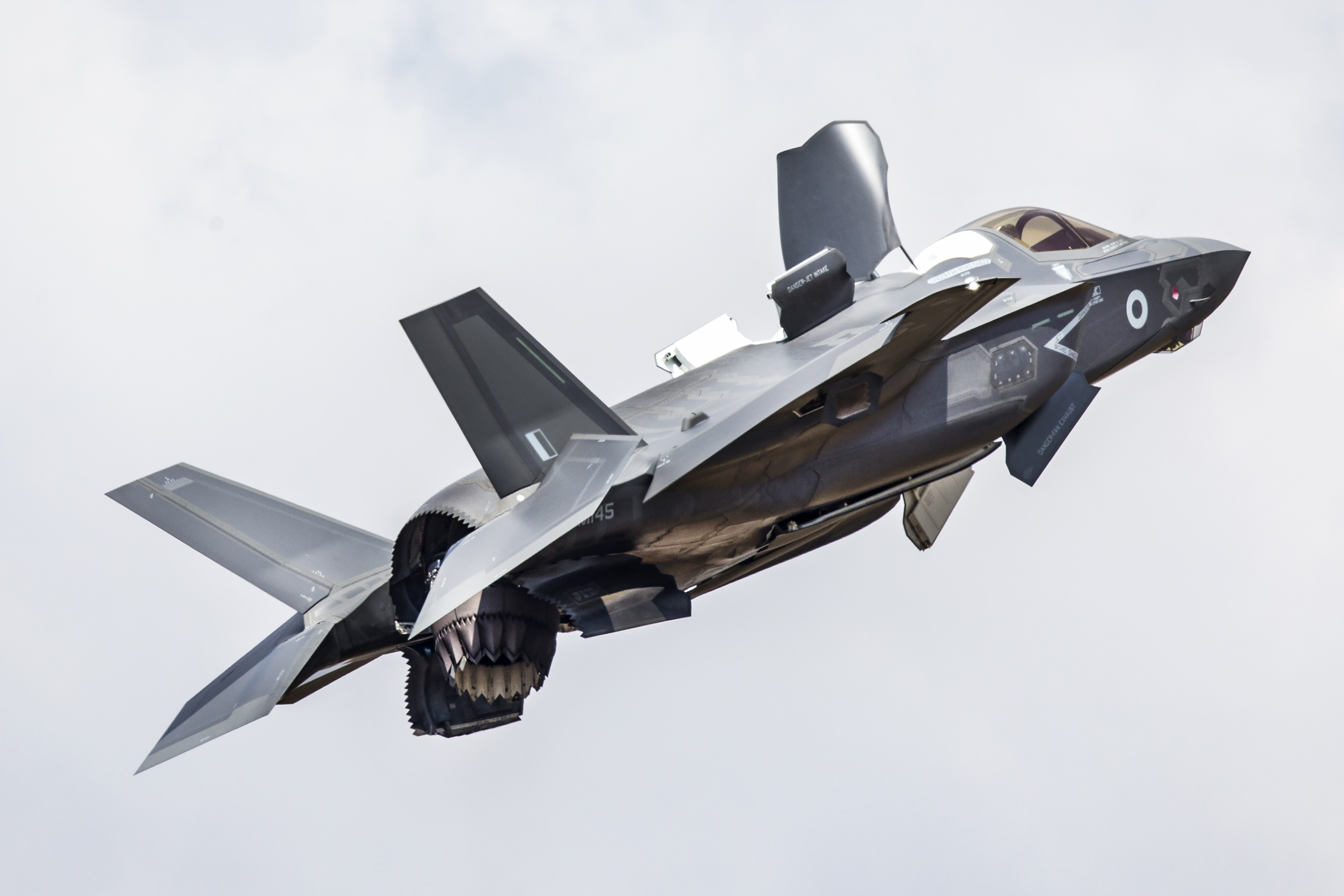
An RAF F-35B Lightning II demonstrating a vertical landing

Some VTOL aircraft can operate in other modes as well, such as CTOL (conventional take-off and landing), STOL (short take-off and landing), or STOVL (short take-off and vertical landing). Others, such as some helicopters, can only operate as VTOL, due to the aircraft's lack of landing gear that can handle taxiing. Some lighter-than-air aircraft also qualify as VTOL aircraft, as they can hover, take off and land with vertical approach/departure profiles.

Electric vertical takeoff and landing aircraft, or eVTOLs, are being developed along with more autonomous flight control technologies and mobility-as-a-service (MaaS) to enable advanced air mobility (AAM), that could include on-demand air taxi services, regional air mobility, freight delivery, and personal air vehicles (PAVs).

Besides the ubiquitous helicopters, there are currently two types of VTOL aircraft in military service: tiltrotor aircraft, such as the Bell Boeing V-22 Osprey, and thrust-vectoring airplanes, such as the Harrier family and F-35B Lightning II, a product of the Joint Strike Fighter program. In the civilian sector, currently only helicopters are in general use (some other types of commercial VTOL aircraft have been proposed and are under development as of 2017). Generally speaking, VTOL aircraft capable of STOVL use the latter wherever possible, since it typically significantly increases takeoff weight, range, or payload compared to pure VTOL.

== History ==
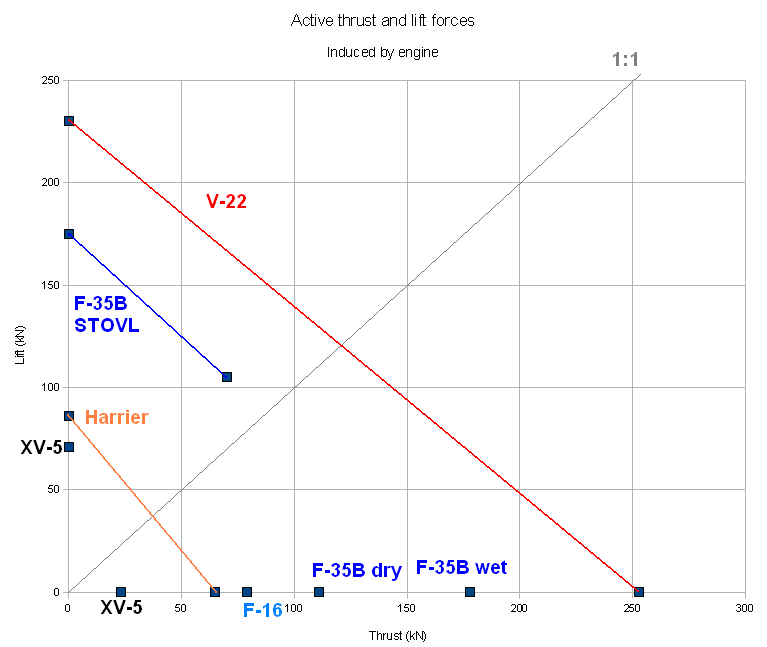
Comparison of lift and thrust for various aircraft

Of dozens of V/STOL designs tried from the 1950s to 1980s, only the subsonic Hawker Siddeley Harrier and Yak-38 Forger reached operational status, with the Forger being withdrawn after the fall of the Soviet Union and the Harriers currently being retired in favor of the F-35B.

=== Props, proprotors, and advanced rotorcraft ===
The idea of vertical flight has been around for thousands of years, and sketches for a VTOL (helicopter) show up in Leonardo da Vinci's sketch book. Manned VTOL aircraft, in the form of primitive helicopters, first flew in 1907, but would take until after World War Two to be perfected.

In addition to helicopter development, many approaches have been tried to develop practical aircraft with vertical take-off and landing capabilities, including Henry Berliner's 1922–1925 experimental horizontal-rotor fixed-wing aircraft, and Nikola Tesla's 1928 patent, and George Lehberger's 1930 patent for relatively impractical VTOL fixed wing airplanes with tilting engines. In the late 1930s, British aircraft designer Leslie Everett Baynes was issued a patent for the Baynes Heliplane, another tiltrotor aircraft. In 1941, German designer Heinrich Focke's began work on the Focke-Achgelis Fa 269, which had two rotors that tilted downward for vertical takeoff, but wartime bombing halted development.

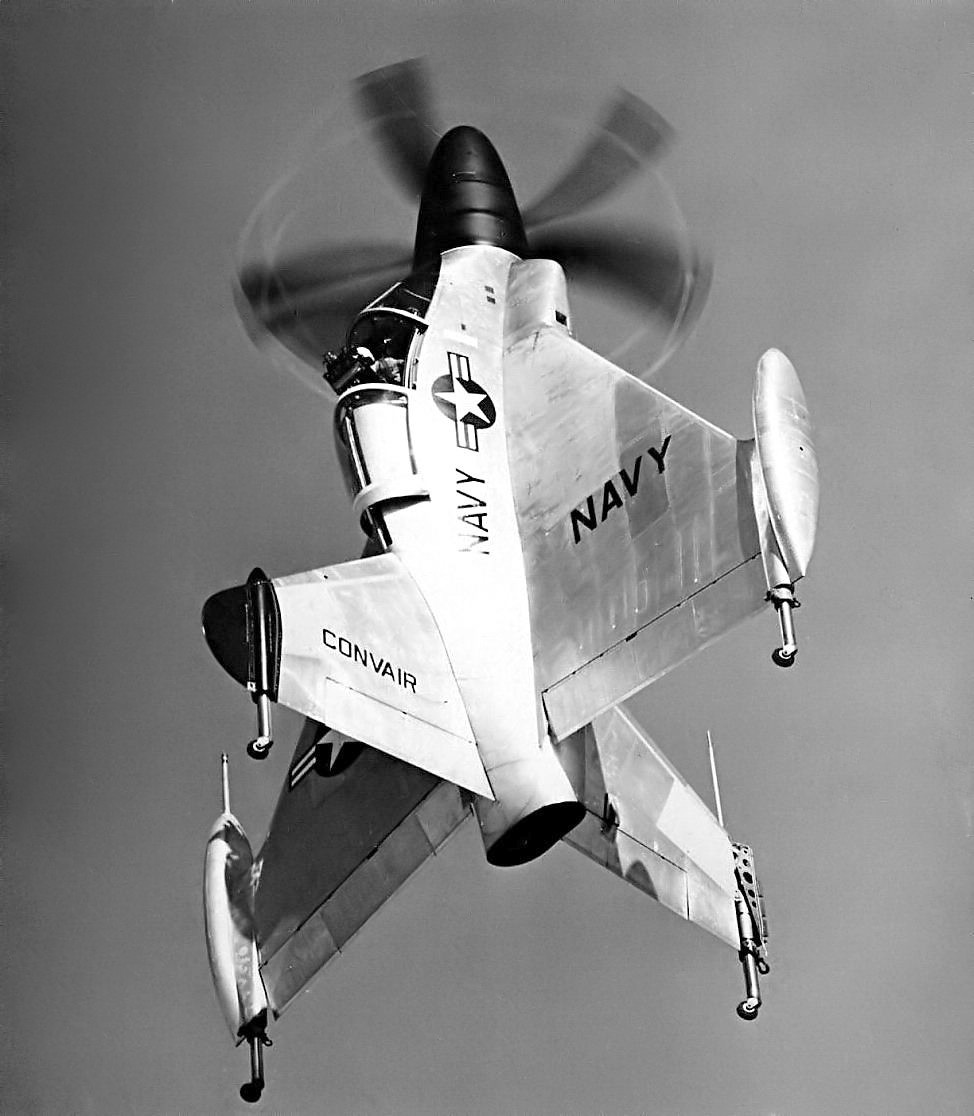
Convair XFY-1 Pogo in vertical flight

In May 1951, both Lockheed and Convair were awarded contracts in the attempt to design, construct, and test two experimental VTOL fighters. Lockheed produced the XFV, and Convair producing the Convair XFY Pogo. Both experimental programs proceeded to flight status and completed test flights 1954–1955, when the contracts were cancelled. Similarly, the Ryan X-13 Vertijet flew a series of test flights between 1955 and 1957, but also suffered the same fate.

In 1962, Lockheed built the XV-4 Hummingbird for the U.S. Army. It sought to "augment" available thrust by injecting the engine exhaust into an ejector pump in the fuselage. First flying vertically in 1963, it suffered a fatal crash in 1964. It was converted into the XV-4B Hummingbird for the U.S. Air Force as a testbed for separate, vertically mounted lift engines, similar to those used in the Yakovlev Yak-38 'Forger'. That plane flew and later crashed in 1969. The Ryan XV-5 Vertifan, which was also built for the U.S. Army at the same time as the Hummingbird, experimented with gas-driven lift fans. That plane used fans in the nose and each wing, covered by doors which resembled half garbage can lids when raised. However, it crashed twice, and proved to generate a disappointing amount of lift, and was difficult to transition to horizontal flight.

Rockwell International built, and then abandoned, the Rockwell XFV-12 supersonic fighter which had an unusual wing which opened up like window blinds to create an ejector pump for vertical flight. It never generated enough lift to get off the ground despite developing 20,000 lbf of thrust. The French had a nominally Mach 2 Dassault Mirage IIIV fitted with no less than 8 lift engines that flew (and crashed), but did not have enough space for fuel or payload for combat missions. The German EWR VJ 101 used swiveling engines mounted on the wingtips with fuselage mounted lift engines, and the VJ 101C X1 reached supersonic flight (Mach 1.08) on 29 July 1964. The supersonic Hawker Siddeley P.1154, which competed with the Mirage IIIV for use in NATO, was cancelled even as the aircraft were being built.

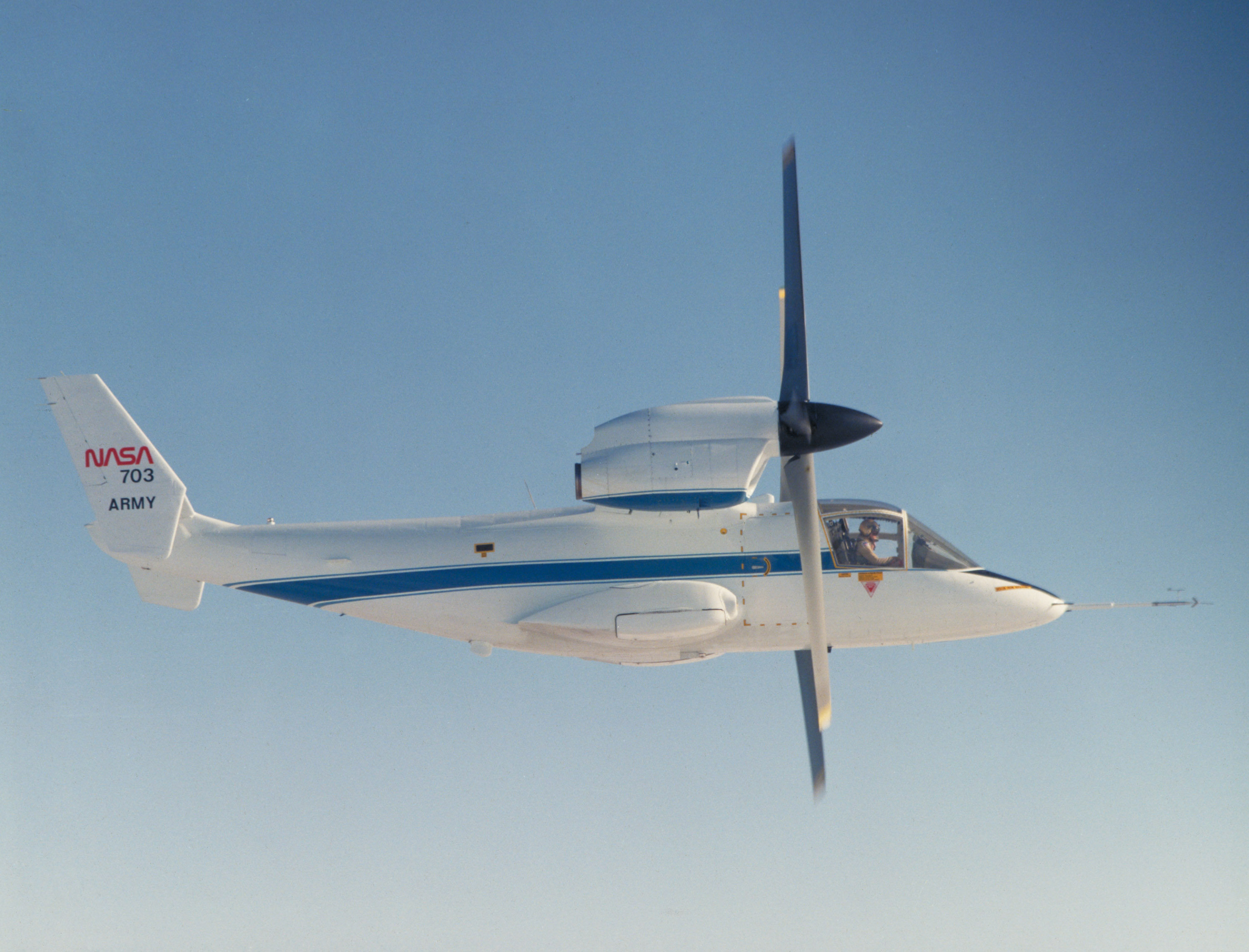
Bell XV-15

NASA has flown other VTOL craft such as the Bell XV-15 research craft (1977), as have the Soviet Navy and Luftwaffe. Sikorsky tested an aircraft dubbed the X-Wing, which took off in the manner of a helicopter. The rotors would become stationary in mid-flight, and function as wings, providing lift in addition to the static wings. Boeing X-50 is a Canard Rotor/Wing prototype that utilizes a similar concept.

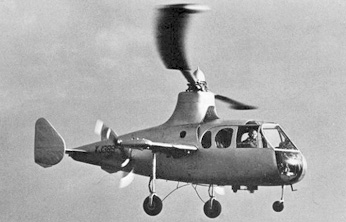
Fairey Jet Gyrodyne

A different British VTOL project was the gyrodyne, where a rotor is powered during take-off and landing but which then freewheels during flight, with separate propulsion engines providing forward thrust. Starting with the Fairey Gyrodyne, this type of aircraft later evolved into the much larger twin-engined Fairey Rotodyne, that used tipjets to power the rotor on take-off and landing but which then used two Napier Eland turboprops driving conventional propellers mounted on substantial wings to provide propulsion, the wings serving to unload the rotor during horizontal flight. The Rotodyne was developed to combine the efficiency of a fixed-wing aircraft at cruise with the VTOL capability of a helicopter to provide short-haul airliner service from city centres to airports.

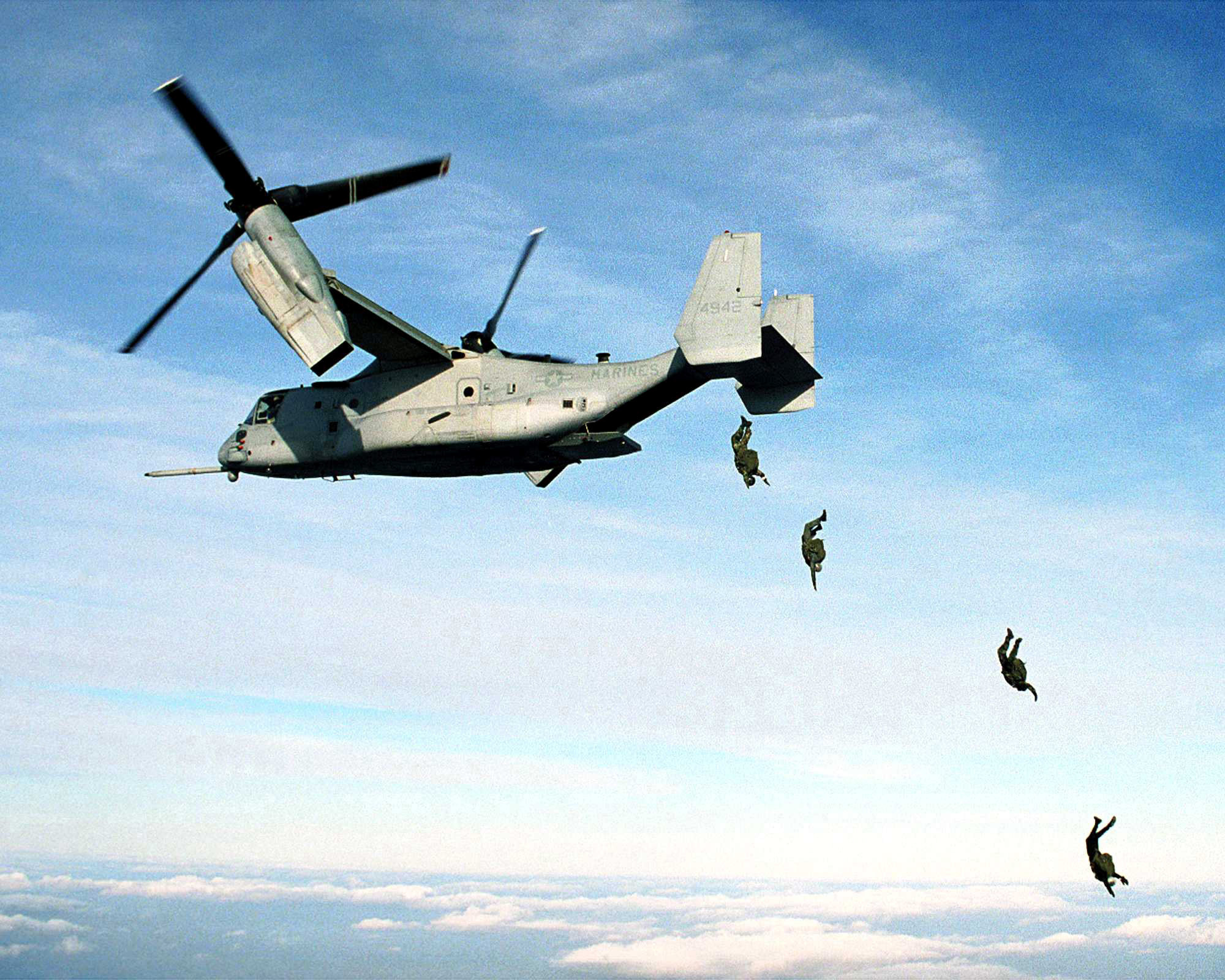
U.S. Marines jump from a Bell-Boeing V-22 Osprey, the first production tiltrotor aircraft

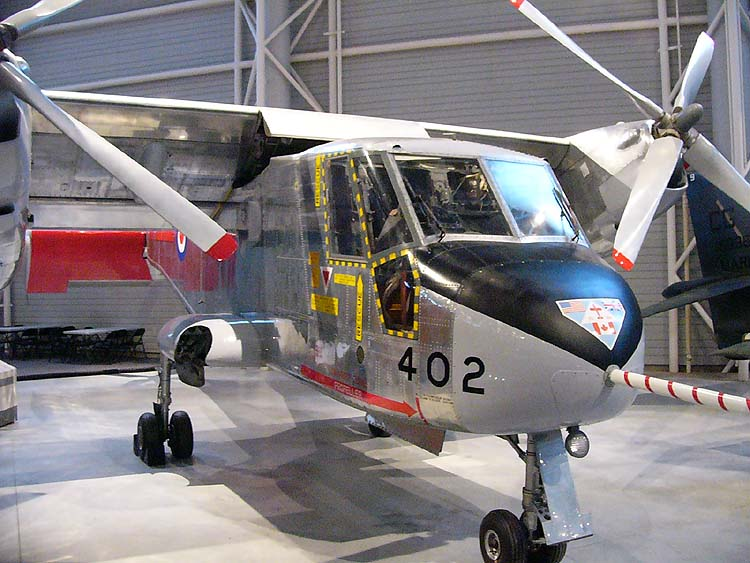
Canadair CL-84 Dynavert CL-84-1 (CX8402) on display at the Canada Aviation and Space Museum in Ottawa, Ontario

The CL-84 Dynavert was a Canadian V/STOL turbine tilt-wing monoplane designed and manufactured by Canadair between 1964 and 1972. The Canadian government ordered three updated CL-84s for military evaluation in 1968, designated the CL-84-1. From 1972 to 1974, this version was demonstrated and evaluated in the United States aboard the aircraft carriers USS Guam and USS Guadalcanal, and at various other centres. These trials involved military pilots from the United States, the United Kingdom, and Canada. During testing, two of the CL-84s crashed due to mechanical failures, but no loss of life occurred as a result of these accidents. No production contracts resulted.

Although tiltrotors such as the Focke-Achgelis Fa 269 of the mid-1940s and the Centro Técnico Aeroespacial "Convertiplano" of the 1950s reached testing or mock-up stages, the Bell-Boeing V-22 Osprey is considered the world's first production tiltrotor aircraft. It has one three-bladed proprotor, turboprop engine, and transmission nacelle mounted on each wingtip. The Osprey is a multi-mission aircraft with both a vertical takeoff and landing (VTOL) and short takeoff and landing capability (STOL). It is designed to perform missions like a conventional helicopter with the long-range, high-speed cruise performance of a turboprop aircraft. The FAA classifies the Osprey as a model of powered lift aircraft.

Attempts were made in the 1960s to develop a commercial passenger aircraft with VTOL capability. The Hawker Siddeley Inter-City Vertical-Lift proposal had two rows of lifting fans on either side. However, none of these aircraft made it to production after they were dismissed as too heavy and expensive to operate.

In 1983, the Defense Advanced Research Projects Agency (DARPA) initiated the Advanced STOVL (ASTOVL) program to develop a supersonic STOVL fighter (SSF) to replace the Harrier for the U.S. Marine Corps and the U.K. Royal Navy. Several propulsion methods were explored under ASTOVL and assigned to different contractors for research and development. These include the Shaft-Driven Lift Fan (SDLF) by Lockheed which had a forward lift fan powered by a shaft connected to the main engine's low-pressure spool and engaged by a clutch, the Lift-Plus-Lift/Cruise (LPLC) by Northrop (later Northrop Grumman) which had a separate dedicated lift engine alongside the main engine, and the Gas-Driven Lift Fan (GDLF) by McDonnell Douglas that used the main engine bleed air to power a lift fan; all methods had an aft vectoring nozzle for the main engine.

ASTOVL would continue under the Common Affordable Lightweight Fighter (CALF) program, which eventually became part of the Joint Strike Fighter program; the Lockheed Martin X-35B with the SDLF was eventually selected for full-scale development in 2001, with the production aircraft for operational service becoming the F-35B with the F135-PW-600 engine. NASA uses the abbreviation SSTOVL for Supersonic Short Take-Off / Vertical Landing, and as of 2012, the X-35B/F-35B are the only aircraft to conform with this combination within one flight.

In 2018, Opener Aero demonstrated an electrically powered fixed-wing VTOL aircraft, the Blackfly, which the manufacturer claims is the world's first ultralight fixed-wing, all-electric, VTOL aircraft.

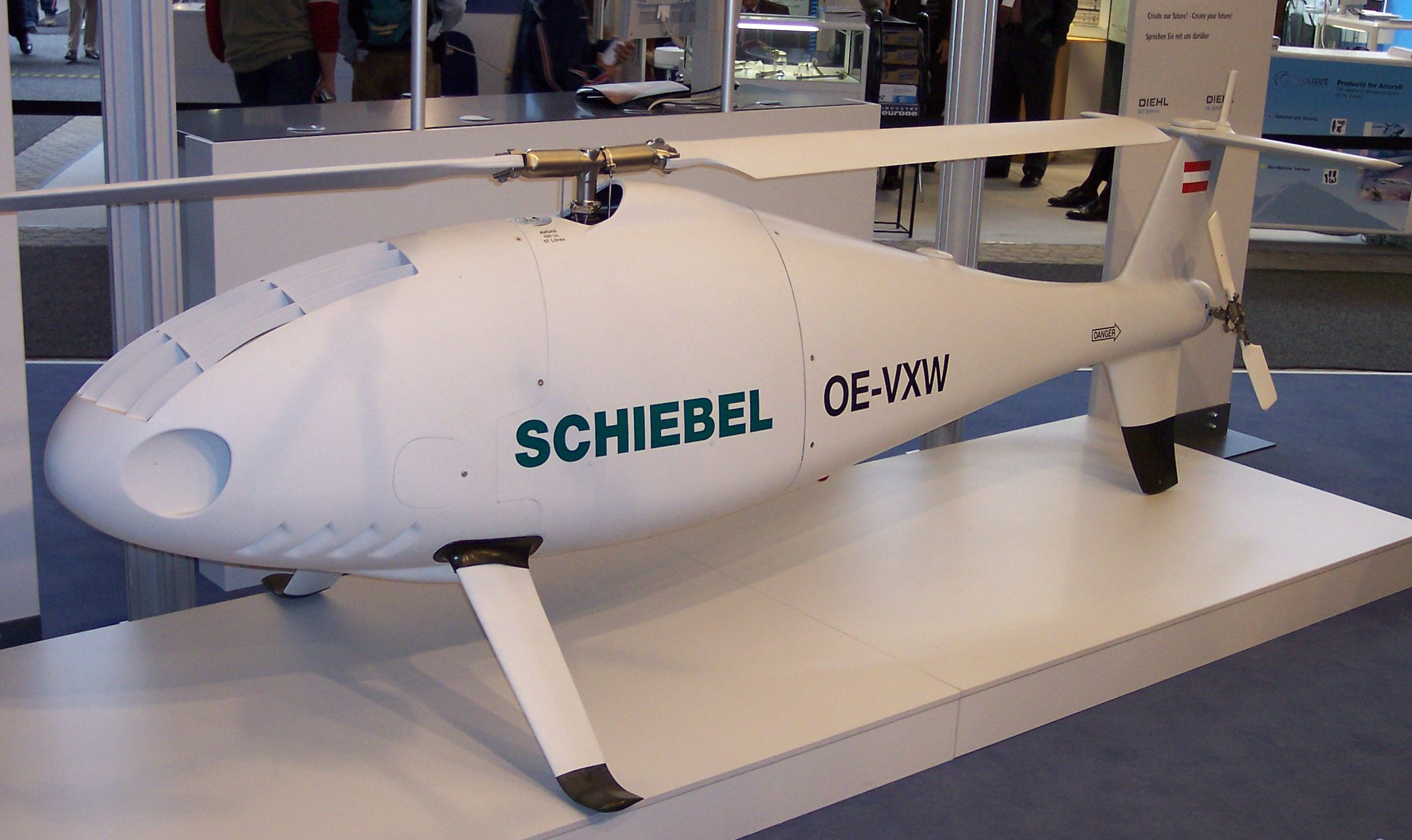
A Schiebel Camcopter S-100, a modern VTOL unmanned aerial vehicle

In the 21st century, unmanned drones are becoming increasingly commonplace. Many of these have VTOL capability, especially the quadcopter type.

=== Jet lift ===
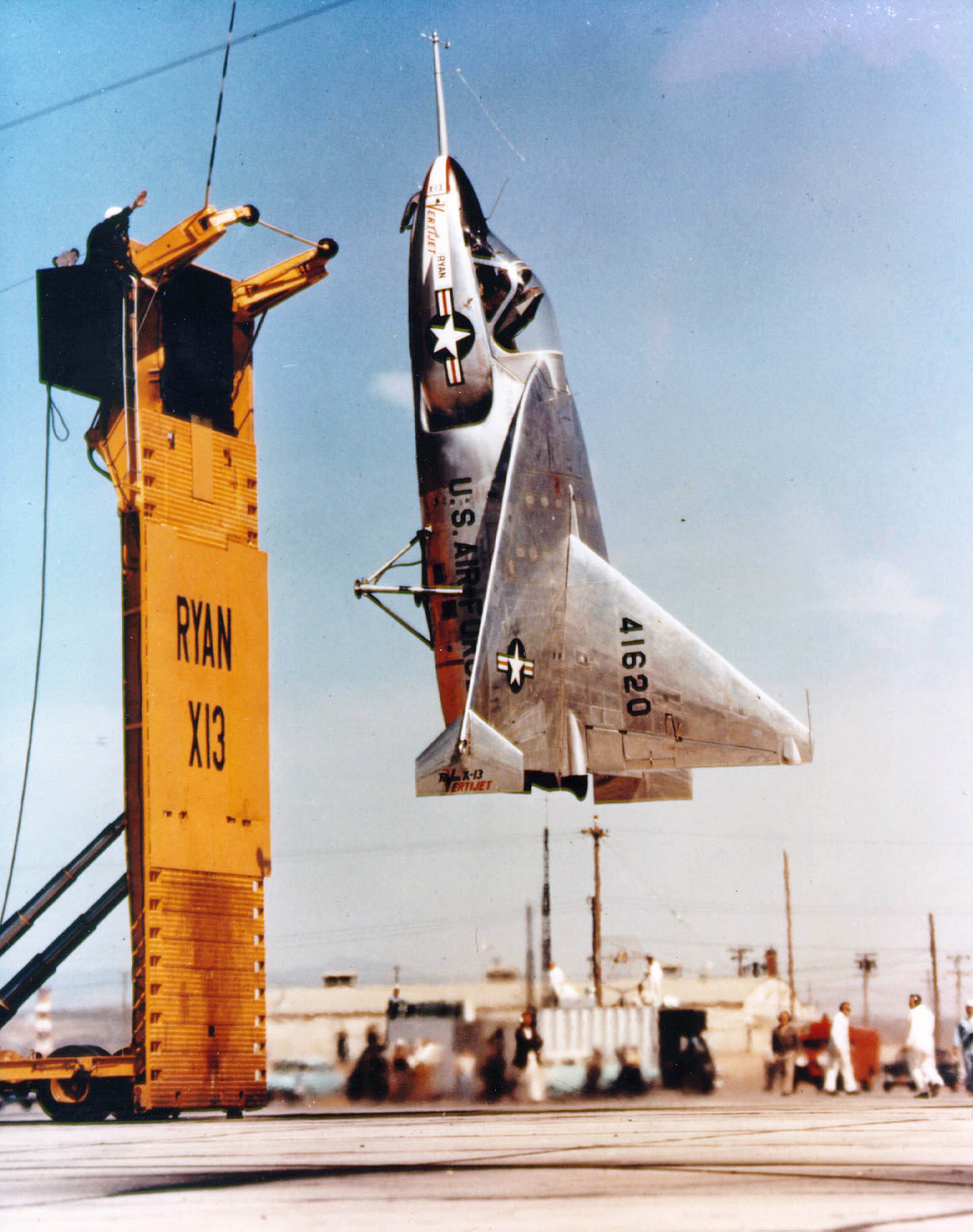
The Ryan X-13

==== Tail-sitters ====
In 1947, the Ryan X-13 Vertijet, a tailsitter design, was ordered by the US Navy, who then further issued a proposal in 1948 for an aircraft capable of VTOL aboard platforms mounted on the afterdecks of conventional ships. Both Convair and Lockheed competed for the contract but in 1950, the requirement was revised, with a call for a research aircraft capable of eventually evolving into a VTOL ship-based convoy escort fighter.

At the end of 1958, the French SNECMA Coléoptère, a tailsitter annular wing design, performed its maiden flight. However the sole prototype was destroyed on its ninth flight in 1959, and financing was never sourced for a second prototype.

==== Conventional design ====
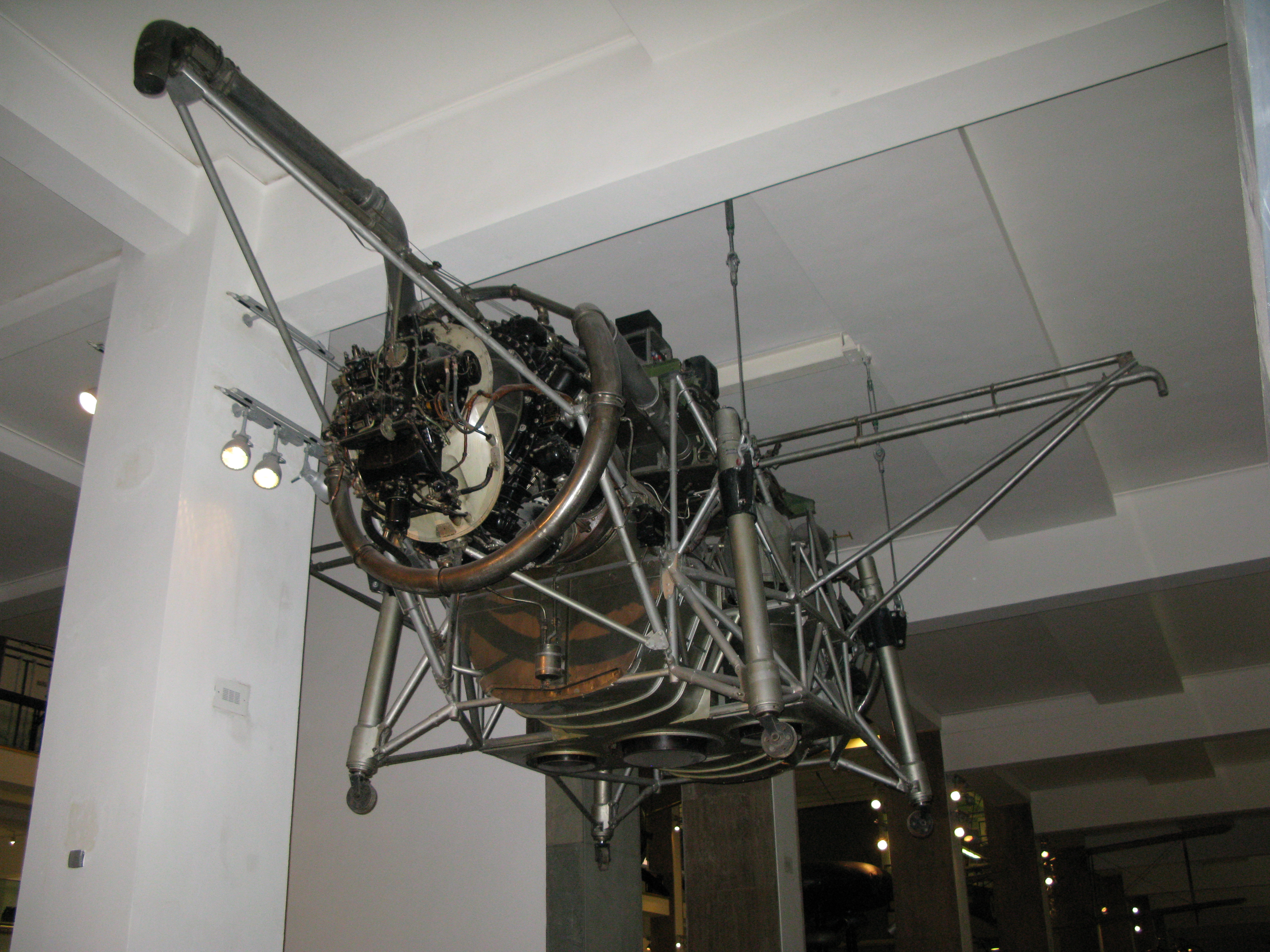
"Flying Bedstead"- Rolls-Royce Thrust Measuring Rig

Another more influential early functional contribution to VTOL was Rolls-Royce's Thrust Measuring Rig ("flying bedstead") of 1953. This led to the first VTOL engines as used in the first British VTOL aircraft, the Short SC.1 (1957), Short Brothers and Harland, Belfast which used four vertical lift engines with a horizontal one for forward thrust.

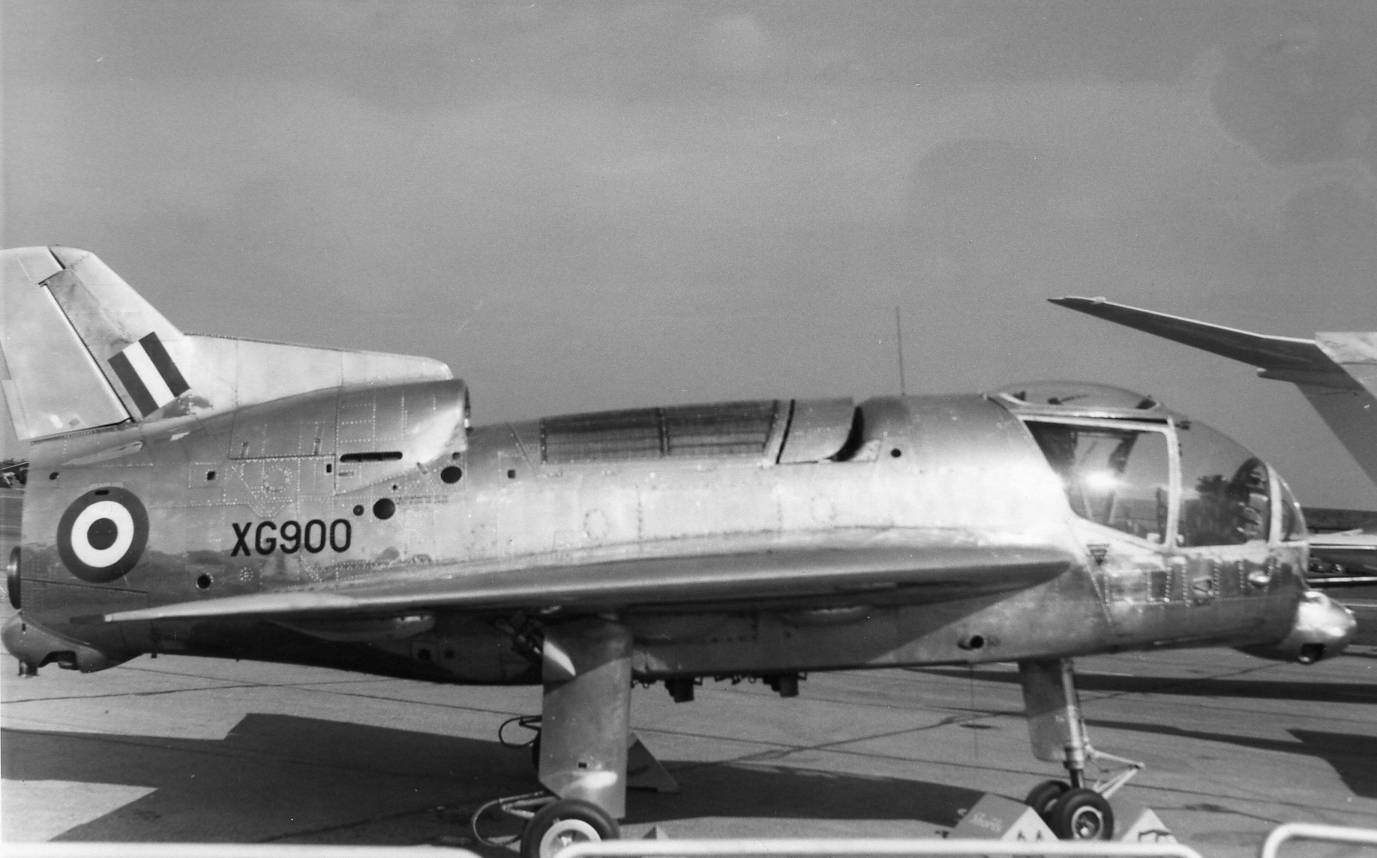
The Short SC.1 a VTOL delta aircraft

The Short SC.1 was the first British fixed-wing VTOL aircraft. The SC.1 was designed to study the problems with VTOL flight and the transition to and from forward flight. The SC.1 was designed to meet a Ministry of Supply (MoS) request for tender (ER.143T) for a vertical take-off research aircraft issued in September 1953. The design was accepted by the ministry and a contract was placed for two aircraft (XG900 and XG905) to meet Specification ER.143D dated 15 October 1954. The SC.1 was also equipped with the first "fly-by-wire" control system for a VTOL aircraft. This permitted three modes of control of the aerodynamic surfaces or the nozzle controls.

The Republic Aviation AP-100 was a prototype VTOL 6x General Electric J85 turbojet-engined nuclear-capable strike fighter concept designed by Alexander Kartveli that had three ducted fans in the centre of its fuselage and tail as a possible contender for the TFX Program. Another design was the A400 AVS that used variable-geometry wings but was found too complicated; however, it led to the development of the AFVG, which in turn helped the development of the Panavia Tornado.

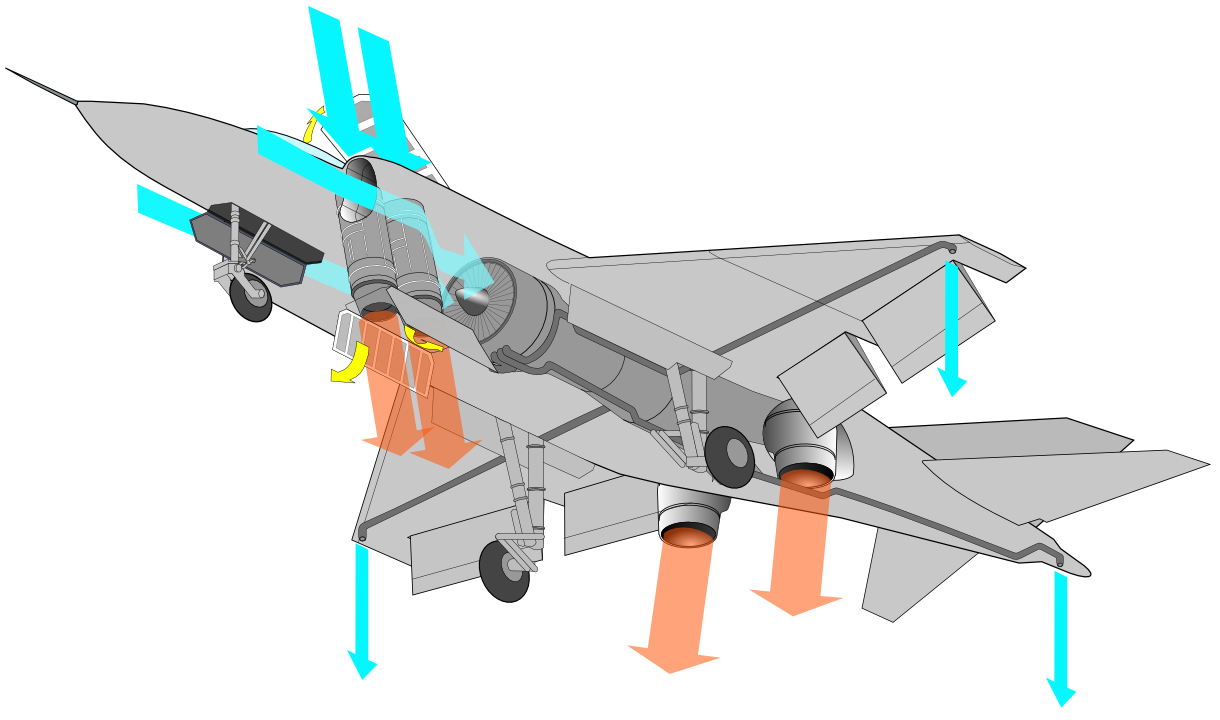
The Soviet Union's VTOL aircraft, the Yakovlev Yak-38

The Yakovlev Yak-38 was a Soviet Navy VTOL aircraft intended for use aboard their light carriers, cargoships, and capital ships. It was developed from the Yakovlev Yak-36 experimental aircraft in the 1970s. Before the Soviet Union broke up, a supersonic VTOL aircraft was developed as the Yak-38's successor, the Yak-141, which never went into production.

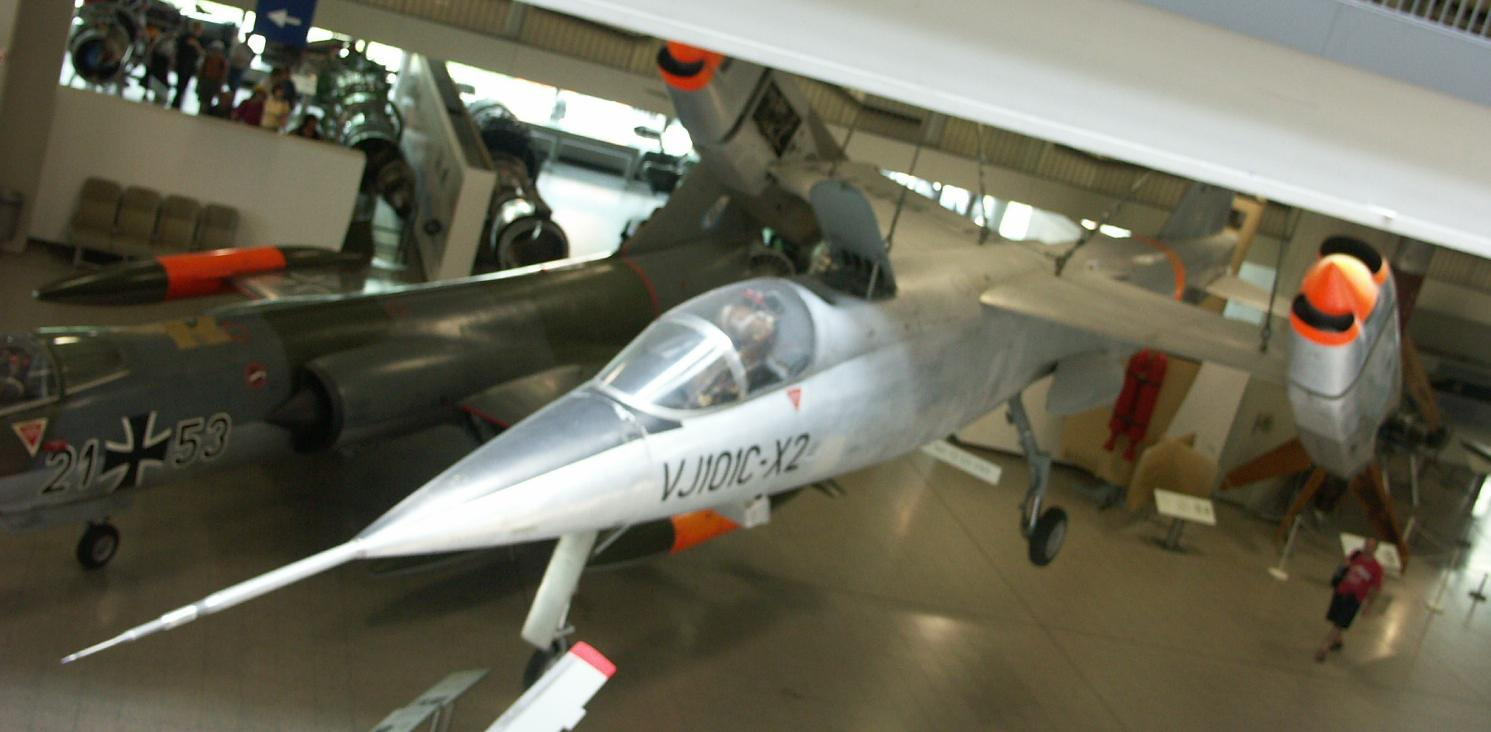
A German V/STOL VJ101 on display at the Deutsches Museum, Munich, Germany

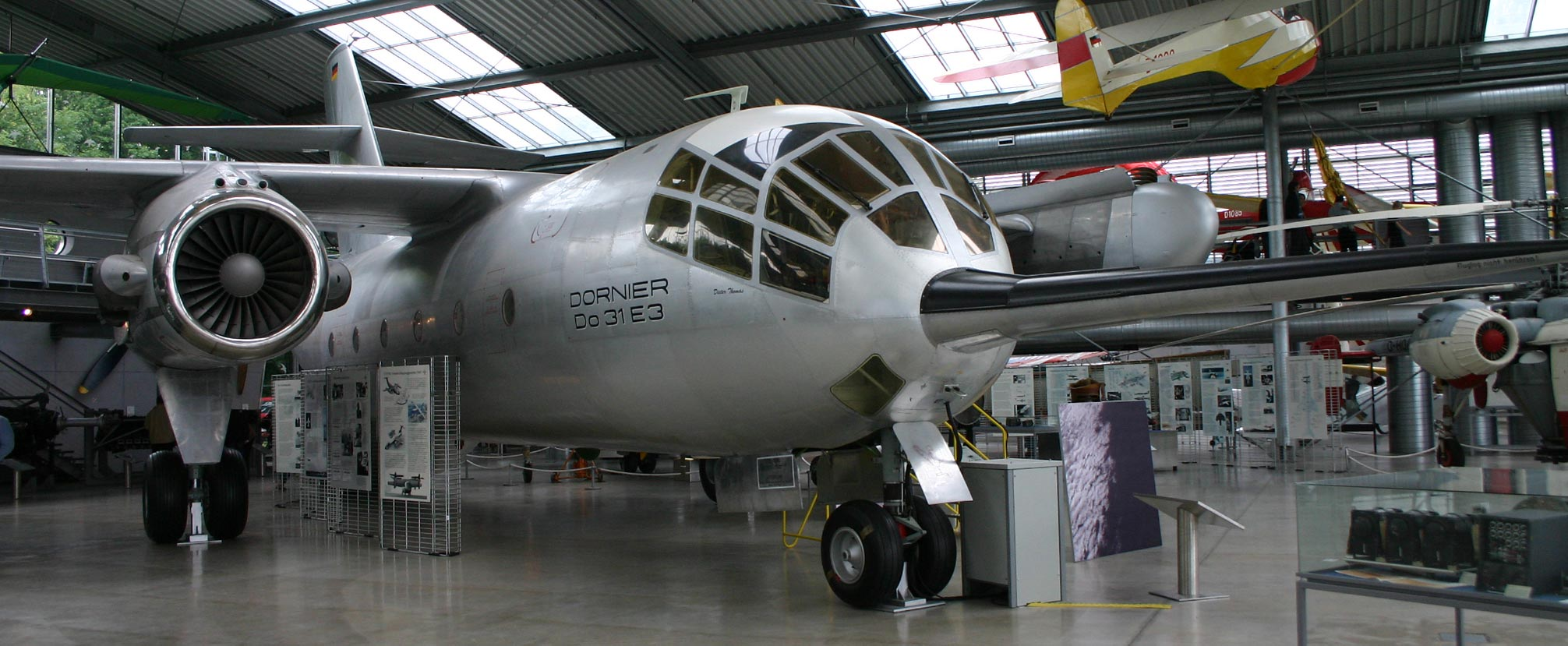
Do 31 E3 on display at the Deutsches Museum, Germany

In the 1960s and early 1970s, Germany planned three different VTOL aircraft. One used the Lockheed F-104 Starfighter as a basis for research for a V/STOL aircraft. Although two models (X1 and X2) were built, the project was canceled due to high costs and political problems as well as changed needs in the German Air Force and NATO. The EWR VJ 101C did perform free VTOL take-offs and landings, as well as test flights beyond mach 1 in the mid- and late 60s. One of the test aircraft is preserved in the Deutsches Museum in Munich, Germany, another outside Friedrichshafen Airport. The others were the VFW-Fokker VAK 191B light fighter and reconnaissance aircraft, and the Dornier Do 31E-3 (troop) transport.

The LLRV was a spacecraft simulator for the Apollo lunar lander. It was designed to mimic the flight characteristics of the lunar exploration module (LEM), which had to rely on a reaction engine to land on the Moon.

The idea of using the same engine for vertical and horizontal flight by altering the path of the thrust was conceived by Michel Wibault. It led to the Bristol Siddeley Pegasus engine which used four rotating nozzles to direct thrust over a range of angles. This was developed side-by-side with an airframe, the Hawker P.1127, which became subsequently the Kestrel and then entered production as the Hawker Siddeley Harrier, though the supersonic Hawker Siddeley P.1154 was canceled in 1965. The French in competition with the P.1154 had developed a version of the Dassault Mirage III capable of attaining Mach 1. The Dassault Mirage IIIV achieved transition from vertical to horizontal flight in March 1966, reaching Mach 1.3 in level flight a short time later.

==== V/STOL ====
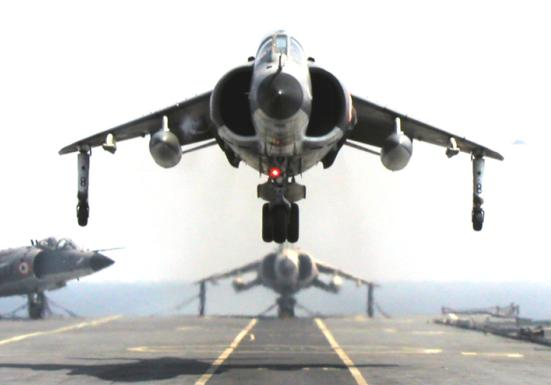
Landing of Harrier jump jet with Indian Naval Air Arm

The Harrier is usually flown in STOVL mode, which enables it to carry a higher fuel or weapon load over a given distance. In V/STOL, the aircraft moves horizontally along the runway before taking off using vertical thrust. This gives aerodynamic lift as well as thrust lift and permits taking off with heavier loads and is more efficient. When landing, the aircraft is much lighter due to the loss of propellant weight, and a controlled vertical landing is possible. An important aspect of Harrier STOL operations aboard naval carriers is the "ski jump" raised forward deck, which gives the craft additional vertical momentum at takeoff.

The March 1981 cover of Popular Science showed three illustrations for its "Tilt-engine V/STOL – speeds like a plane, lands like a copter" front-page feature story; a followup story was part of the April 2006 issue that mentioned "the fuel-consumption and stability problems that plagued earlier plane/copter."

Retired from the British Royal Navy in 2006, the Indian Navy continued to operate Sea Harriers until 2016, mainly from its aircraft carrier INS Viraat. The latest version of the Harrier, the BAE Harrier II, was retired in December 2010 after being operated by the British Royal Air Force and Royal Navy. The Italian and Spanish navies continue to use the AV-8B Harrier II, an American-British variant. In 2026, The United States Marine Corps retired their final AV-8Bs, with the 2nd Marine Aircraft Wing's VMA-223 "Bulldogs" holding a "sundown" ceremony at MCAS Cherry Point. Replacing the Harrier II/AV-8B in the air arms of the US and UK is the STOVL variant of the Lockheed Martin F-35 Lightning II, the F-35B.

==== Convertiplanes and gyrodynes ====
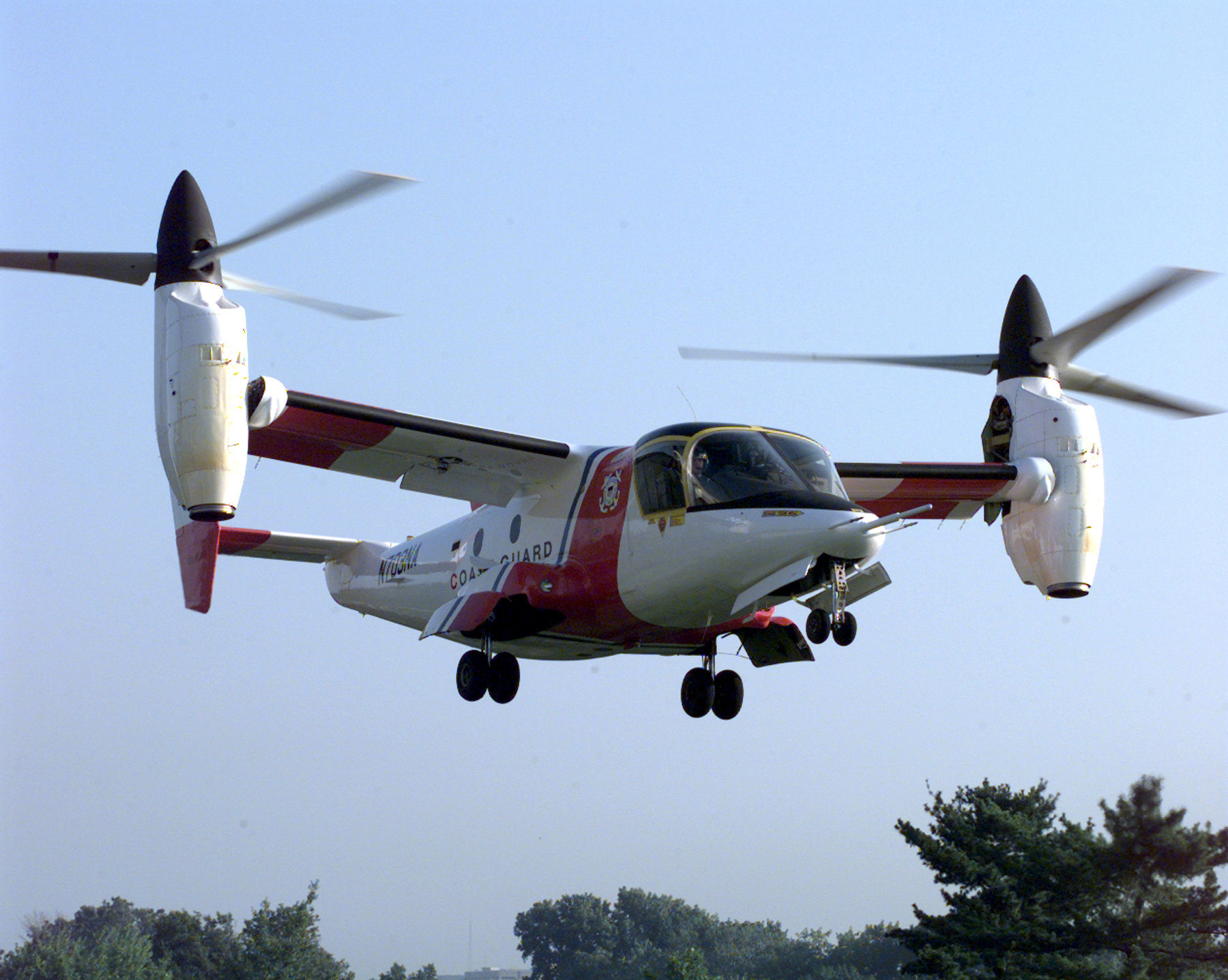
A Bell XV-15 prepares to land

A tiltrotor is a rotorcraft that generates lift and propulsion by way of one or more powered rotors (sometimes called proprotors) mounted on rotating shafts or nacelles usually at the ends of a fixed wing. Tiltrotor design combines the VTOL capability of a helicopter with the speed and range of a conventional fixed-wing aircraft.

A tiltwing is similar to a tiltrotor, except that the rotor mountings are fixed to the wing and the whole assembly tilts between vertical and horizontal positions.

A gyrodyne is a type of VTOL aircraft with a helicopter rotor-like system that needs to be driven by its engine only for takeoff and landing, and includes one or more conventional propeller or jet engines to provide thrust during cruising flight.

==== Rockets ====
SpaceX developed several prototypes of Falcon 9 to validate various low-altitude, low-velocity engineering aspects of its reusable launch system development program. The first prototype, Grasshopper, made eight successful test flights in 2012–2013. It made its eighth, and final, test flight on October 7, 2013, flying to an altitude of 744 metres (2,441 ft) before making its eighth successful VTVL landing. This was the last scheduled test for the Grasshopper rig; next up will be low altitude tests of the Falcon 9 Reusable (F9R) development vehicle in Texas followed by high altitude testing in New Mexico.

On November 23, 2015, Blue Origin's New Shepard booster rocket made the first successful vertical landing following an uncrewed suborbital test flight that reached space. On December 21, 2015, SpaceX Falcon 9 first stage made a successful landing after boosting 11 commercial satellites to low Earth orbit on Falcon 9 Flight 20. These demonstrations opened the way for substantial reductions in space flight costs.

== Lists of V/STOL aircraft ==
This is a partial list; there have been many designs for V/STOL aircraft.

=== Tail-sitter ===
- Convair XFY-1 Pogo
- Ryan X-13 Vertijet

=== Vectored thrust ===
- Hawker P.1127/Kestrel/Harrier; four rotating nozzles for vectored thrust of fan and jet exhaust.

=== Tilt-jet ===
- Bell XF-109
- Bell 65
- EWR VJ 101

=== Tilt-rotor ===
- AgustaWestland AW609 (originally Bell 609)
- AgustaWestland Project Zero technology demonstrator
- Bell XV-3
- Bell XV-15
- Bell-Boeing V-22 Osprey (scale up of XV-15)
- Bell MV-75 Cheyenne II
- Dobson Convertiplane

=== Tilt-wing ===
- Curtiss-Wright X-19 – four rotating propellers, tilt-wing.
- Canadair CL-84 Dynavert, two turboprop tilt-wing
- LTV XC-142 four-engine tilt-wing cross-shafted turboprop
- Bell X-22 rotating ducted propellers. Small transport prototype. Slightly smaller than V-22 Osprey.
- Hiller X-18

=== Separate thrust and lift ===
- Dornier Do 31 Jet transport with podded vector nozzles and lift engines
- Kamov Ka-22
- Lockheed XV-4 Hummingbird
- Dassault Balzac V (V stands for vertical and is a modified Mirage III)
- Dassault Mirage IIIV the first VTOL capable of supersonic flight (Mach 2.03 during tests)
- Fokker/Republic D-24 Alliance
- Ryan XV-5. Fans in wings driven by engine exhaust gas.
- VFW VAK 191B Attack fighter similar to Harrier but supersonic dash speed, smaller wings and lift engines. Flown, but not operational.
- Yakovlev Yak-38
- Yakovlev Yak-141
- Short SC.1

=== Supersonic ===
Although many aircraft have been proposed and built, with a few being tested, the F-35B is the first and only supersonic V/STOL aircraft to have reached operational service, having entered service in 2016.

- Bell D-188A Mach 2 swivelling engines, mockup stage
- Daimler-Benz VTOL quadjet fighter. It was not completed.
- EWR VJ 101 Mach 2 fighter, flown to Mach 1.04 but not operational
- Dassault Mirage IIIV Delta wing Mach 2 fighter with lift engines, first VTOL capable of supersonic and Mach 2 flight (Mach 2.03 during tests), not operational
- Hawker Siddeley HS 138 Strike fighter with lift fans. It was not completed.
- Hawker Siddeley P.1017 Lift engines with thrust vectoring. It was not completed.
- Hawker Siddeley P.1154 M1.7 Supersonic Harrier. It was not completed.
- Hawker Siddeley P.1184-16 Dash 18
- Hawker Siddeley P.1217
- Republic AP-100 strike fighter concept
- Convair Model 200 Lift engines plus swivel tailpipe, not built
- Rockwell XFV-12 Built with complex "window blind" wings but could not lift its own weight
- Yakovlev Yak-141 Lift engines plus swivel tailpipe
- Lockheed Martin X-35B / F-35B uses a vectored-thrust tailpipe (the Pratt & Whitney F135) plus a shaft-driven lifting fan. It is the first aircraft capable of demonstrating transition from short take-off to supersonic flight to vertical landing on the same sortie.

== See also ==
- Circular wing – Disc-shaped wing
- List of Nikola Tesla patents
- List of VTOL aircraft – List of "VTOL" (Vertical Take-off and Landing) aircraft
- McDonnell Douglas DC-X – Prototype single-stage-to-orbit rocket developed & flown between 1991-1996
- Mono tiltrotor – Aircraft type
- Peter Bielkowicz – Physicist
- Proprotor – Type of airfoil
- PTOL
- Quad (rocket) – VTVL technology demonstrator
- Reusable Vehicle Testing – Japanese reusable rocket testing project JAXA
- Rotor wing – Rotating aerodynamic rotor or wing
- Thrust reversal – Temporary diversion of an aircraft engine's thrust
- Thrust vectoring – Facet of ballistics and aeronautics
- Vertical Flight Society – Aviation society
- Tiltrotor – Aircraft type
- VTOL X-Plane – American experimental aircraft of DARPA

== Bibliography ==
- Allen, Francis J. "Bolt upright: Convair's and Lockheed's VTOL fighters". Air Enthusiast (Key Publishing), Volume 127, January/February 2007. ISSN 0143-5450.
- Alsalem, Ahmed; Zohdy, Mohamed (2023). "A Review on Civil Applications of Vertical Take-Off and Landing Vehicles". 2023 IEEE Conference on Technologies for Sustainability (SusTech). pp. 130–137. doi:10.1109/SusTech57309.2023.10129574. ISBN 979-8-3503-4548-3.
- Boniface, Patrick. "Tilt-wing Testing". Aeroplane, Vol. 28, no. 3, March 2000, pp. 72–78.
- Campbell, John P. Vertical Takeoff & Landing Aircraft. New York: The MacMillan Company, 1962.
- Harding, Stephen. "Flying Jeeps: The US Army's Search for the Ultimate 'Vehicle'". Air Enthusiast, No. 73, January/February 1998, pp. 10–12. Stamford, Lincs, UK: Key Publishing. ISSN 0143-5450.
- Jackson, Paul A. German Military Aviation 1956–1976. Hinckley, Leicestershire, UK: Midland Counties Publications, 1976. ISBN 0-904597-03-2.
- Khurana, K. C. Aviation Management: Global Perspectives. Singapore: Global India Publications, 2009. ISBN 978-9-3802-2839-6.
- Markman, Steve and Bill Holder. Straight Up: A History of Vertical Flight. Atglen, Pennsylvania: Schiffer Publishing, 2000. ISBN 0-7643-1204-9.
- Norton, Bill. Bell Boeing V-22 Osprey, Tiltrotor Tactical Transport. Earl Shilton, Leicester, UK: Midland Publishing, 2004. ISBN 1-85780-165-2.
- Rogers, Mike. VTOL: Military Research Aircraft. New York: Orion Books, 1989. ISBN 0-517-57684-8.
- Büchi, Roland. Fascination Quadrocopter. Norderstedt, BoD, English Version, 2011. ISBN 978-3-8423-6731-9
