= VFW SG 1262 Schwebegestell =

1960s German experimental aircraft

SG 1262
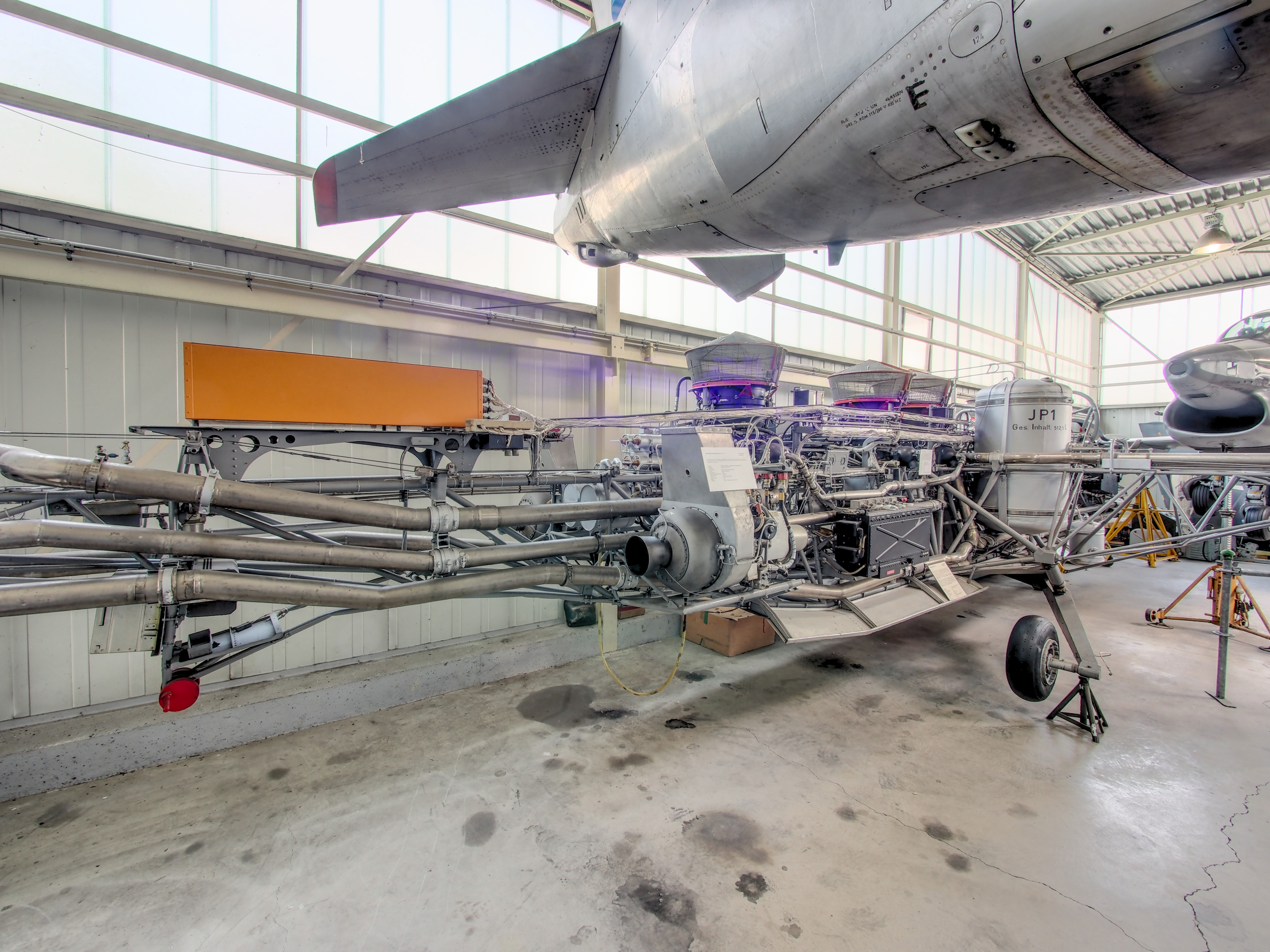
- SG 1262 on display at the Bundeswehr Museum of German Defense Technology, Koblenz

General information
- Type: Experimental vertical take-off
- National origin: Germany
- Manufacturer: Vereinigte Flugtechnische Werke
- Number built: One

History
- First flight: 5 August 1966 (first free flight)

The German VFW SG 1262 Schwebegestell (hover rig) was designed and built in 1965 by Vereinigte Flugtechnische Werke (VFW) as an experimental aircraft to assist with the development of several vertical takeoff and landing (VTOL) military aircraft types that included the VFW VAK 191B, the EWR VJ 101 and the Dornier Do 31 transport. The 1262 designation relates to the initial numbering of the VAK 191B project by Focke-Wulf.

Tethered test flights were followed in August 1966 by free flights that included an appearance at a Hanover air show. Although the German VTOL programme did not proceed test results were used during development of the Panavia Tornado. The SG 1262 is displayed at the Bundeswehr Museum of German Defense Technology in Koblenz.

== Background ==
As part of the development of the VFW-Fokker VAK 191B vertical take-off aircraft, it was necessary to configure and test the monitoring of its flight control system. In order to minimise costs and risks during the development of the 191B the SG 1262 rig was designed and built in 1966 to simulate essential functions. Of high importance was the necessity to test the fly-by-wire flight control system, a redundant flight controller and a self-diagnosis system. A total of approximately 650 hours of simulation time, 2,000 hours of test runs on system test benches and 6,900 hours of wind tunnel tests were documented during the design phase of the project.

== Technical description ==
The aircraft was based on a trapezoidal frame without any skin panels. Deviating from the vectored thrust engine concept of the VAK 191B, five Rolls-Royce RB.108 turbojet lift engines with 9 kN (2,000 lbf) thrust each were mounted vertically. In addition to extensive sensor equipment, the rig used an auxiliary gas turbine for autonomous electrical power supply, it was also fitted with a Martin-Baker ejection seat.

The control commands were transmitted via an electrical control (fly-by-wire) system with mechanical feedback. The flight control system had triple redundancy and double electro-hydraulic servo units with integrated self-monitoring. The control commands for the three axes were accomplished with compressed air nozzles that were actuated by a 280 bar (4,000 psi) high-pressure hydraulic system, movement of the main engines for control purposes was deliberately omitted. A direct mechanical back up of the compressed air control system was provided for emergencies.

== Operational history ==
40 tethered flights were initially carried out using a fixed telescopic apparatus before the aircraft flew in free flight for the first time on 5 August 1966. 150 free flights were made during the 18-month test program, including a demonstration flight at the 1968 Hanover Air Show at Hanover-Langenhagen.

Despite the discontinuation of all German vertical take-off programs the findings from experiments with the SG 1262 and experience gained from the VAK 191B project were used by German engineers during the development of the Multi Role Combat Aircraft (MRCA) project which became the Panavia Tornado.

== Aircraft on display ==
The SG 1262 is preserved and on display at the Bundeswehr Museum of German Defense Technology in Koblenz.

== Specifications ==
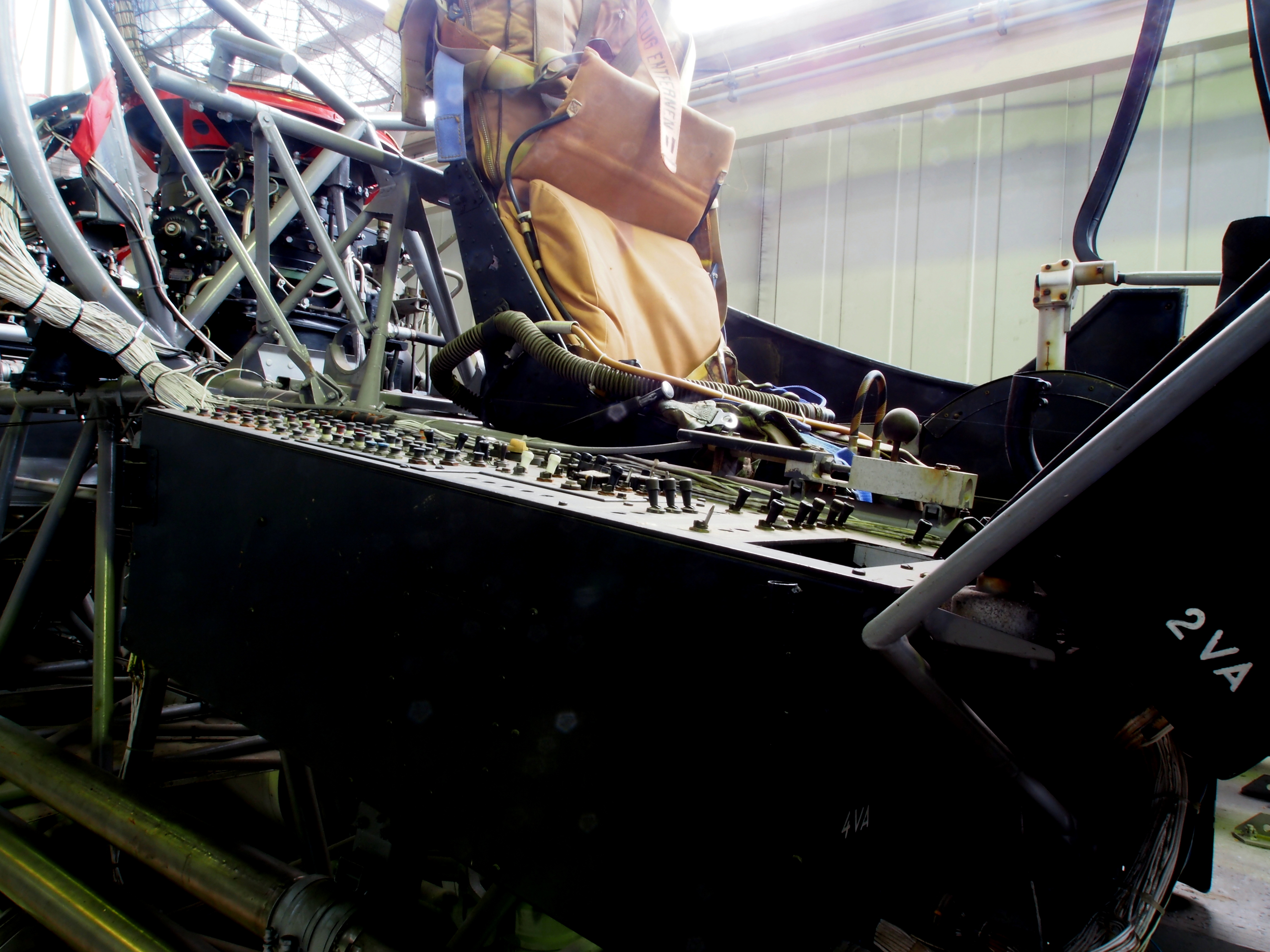
Ejection seat and pilot's side console controls

Data from Flugrevue

General characteristics

- Crew: 1
- Gross weight: 3,900 kg (8,598 lb)
- Fuel capacity: 800 kg
- Powerplant: 5 × Rolls-Royce RB.108 turbojet engines, 9 kN (2,000 lbf) thrust each

Performance

- Maximum speed: 75 km/h (47 mph, 40 kn)
- Endurance: 12 minutes
- Service ceiling: 200 m (660 ft)
- Thrust/weight: 1.15

== See also ==
- NBMR-3 - A 1961 NATO requirement for V/STOL military aircraft designs

Aircraft of comparable role, configuration, and era

- Aérospatiale Ludion
- Lunar Landing Research Vehicle
- Rolls-Royce Thrust Measuring Rig - A similar but earlier (1954) VTOL research aircraft

Related lists

- List of VTOL aircraft
