= NBMR-3 =

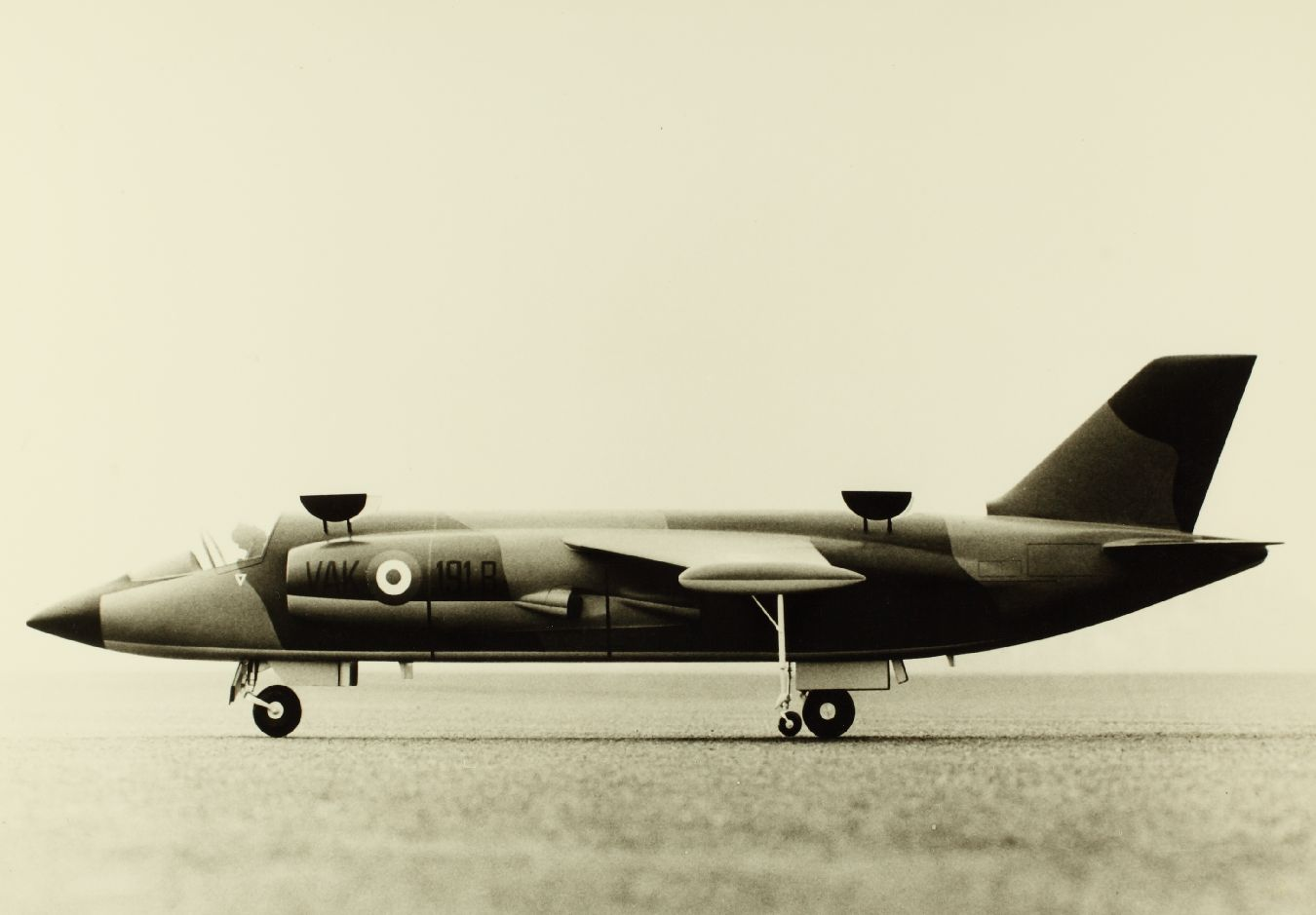
- Conceptual model of the VFW VAK 191B V/STOL fighter-bomber aircraft

General information
- Project for: Development of VTOL military aircraft
- Issued by: NATO
- Prototypes: Dassault Mirage IIIV; EWR VJ 101; VFW VAK 191B

History
- Initiated: 1961
- Concluded: 1967

NBMR-3 or NATO Basic Military Requirement 3 was a document produced by a North Atlantic Treaty Organisation (NATO) committee in the early 1960s detailing the specification of future combat aircraft designs. The requirement was for aircraft in two performance groups, supersonic fighter aircraft (NBMR-3a) and subsonic fighter-bomber aircraft (NBMR-3b). Both requirements specifically stated the need for V/STOL performance as the contemporary fear was that airfields could be overrun or disabled through Eastern Bloc hostile actions and that dispersed operating bases would be needed. Germany was planning replacements for the Fiat G.91 and Lockheed F-104G Starfighter using the new aircraft types.

Aircraft manufacturing companies of European countries were invited to submit designs, from a short-list of 10 supersonic fighter designs two were chosen as the joint winners, the Hawker Siddeley P.1154 and Dassault Mirage IIIV. Disagreement over the balance between best performance aircraft and one which would benefit the aircraft industry more meant that neither type entered service.

Subsonic fighter-bomber designs were also submitted to fulfil the second part of the requirement, of 11 designs four were short-listed with the VFW VAK 191B being declared the winner. This aircraft was built and flown but did not enter service.

A contemporary alternative to new aircraft type procurement was the novel idea of rocket launching existing fighter aircraft types from ramps and recovering the aircraft on short strips using arrestor gear. A related requirement, NBMR-4, detailed specifications for transport aircraft with similar performance to support the fighter and fighter-bomber aircraft at remote sites. The Fiat G.222 and Dornier Do 31 were the only designs to fly from a revised requirement (NBMR-22), the Dornier being used for test purposes only.

Engine development for new powerplants ran alongside the aircraft projects. The requirements were withdrawn in 1967, aircraft prototypes that had been built were used for experimental purposes until they were retired in the early 1970s. Examples of aircraft types involved in the programme have been preserved and are on display in aviation museums.

== NBMR-3a ==
NBMR-3a was the selection criteria for new supersonic V/STOL fighter aircraft designs. A NATO advisory committee met in July 1960 and subsequently published an outline document for the requirement, by July 1961 detailed aircraft specifications had been agreed and a letter was sent to 40 aircraft manufacturers. The selected aircraft types were intended to enter service between 1964 and 1967.

=== Minimum requirements ===
- Speed - Mach 2.
- Takeoff and landing - V/STOL performance.

=== Aircraft designs submitted ===
France

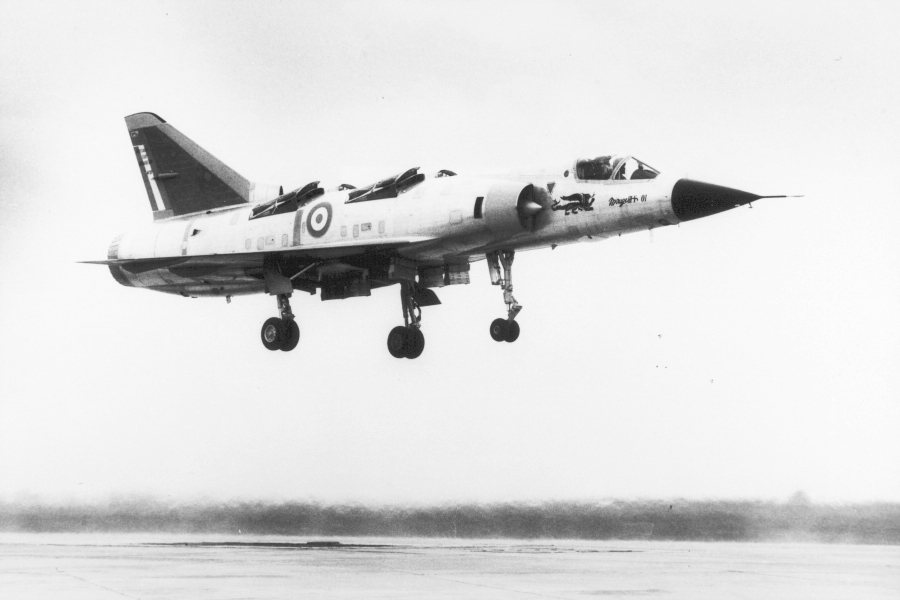
Dassault Mirage IIIV during flight testing

- Dassault Mirage IIIV

Netherlands

- Fokker-Republic D24 Alliance

United Kingdom

- English Electric P.39
- Hawker P.1150/3
- Hawker Siddeley P.1154
- Vickers 583
- Vickers 584
- Vickers 585

Of these aircraft types the majority remained paper projects, the Dassault Balzac V served as an engine and systems testbed for two Mirage IIIV prototypes that were built and test flown in 1965, one aircraft (the second one, named "V-02") was lost in an accident (killing its pilot), but the other (the "V-01") is preserved and still on display at the Musée de l'air et de l'espace (Air & Space Museum) near Paris.

The P.1154 had been judged to be technically superior, but the Mirage had greater potential for cooperative development and production being spread across the member nations. The French government withdrew over the selection of the P.1154 over the Dassault design. In the UK the P.1154 had still found support for meeting the RAF needs and construction was under way on the prototype airframes when the newly elected government cancelled it in 1964 (along with other aircraft projects) on cost grounds.

== NBMR-3b ==
NBMR-3b was the criteria for subsonic V/STOL fighter-bomber aircraft designs, the document was published in December 1961. In February 1962 the committee amended NBMR-3a (supersonic aircraft) to add the requirement for Lockheed F-104G replacement with no change to the criteria and NBMR-3b for a Fiat G.91 replacement with a reduced load carrying ability (1,000 lb (450 kg)) and reduced combat radius of 180 nautical miles (330 km).

=== Minimum requirements ===
- Speed - Mach 0.92 at sea level
- Combat radius - 250 nautical miles (460 km) at 500 ft (150 m) altitude with five minute loiter in forward area.
- Takeoff and landing - VTOL
- 2,000 lb (900 kg) store capacity and capable of nuclear weapon delivery

=== Aircraft designs submitted ===
France

- Breguet 122
- Nord N.4400

Germany

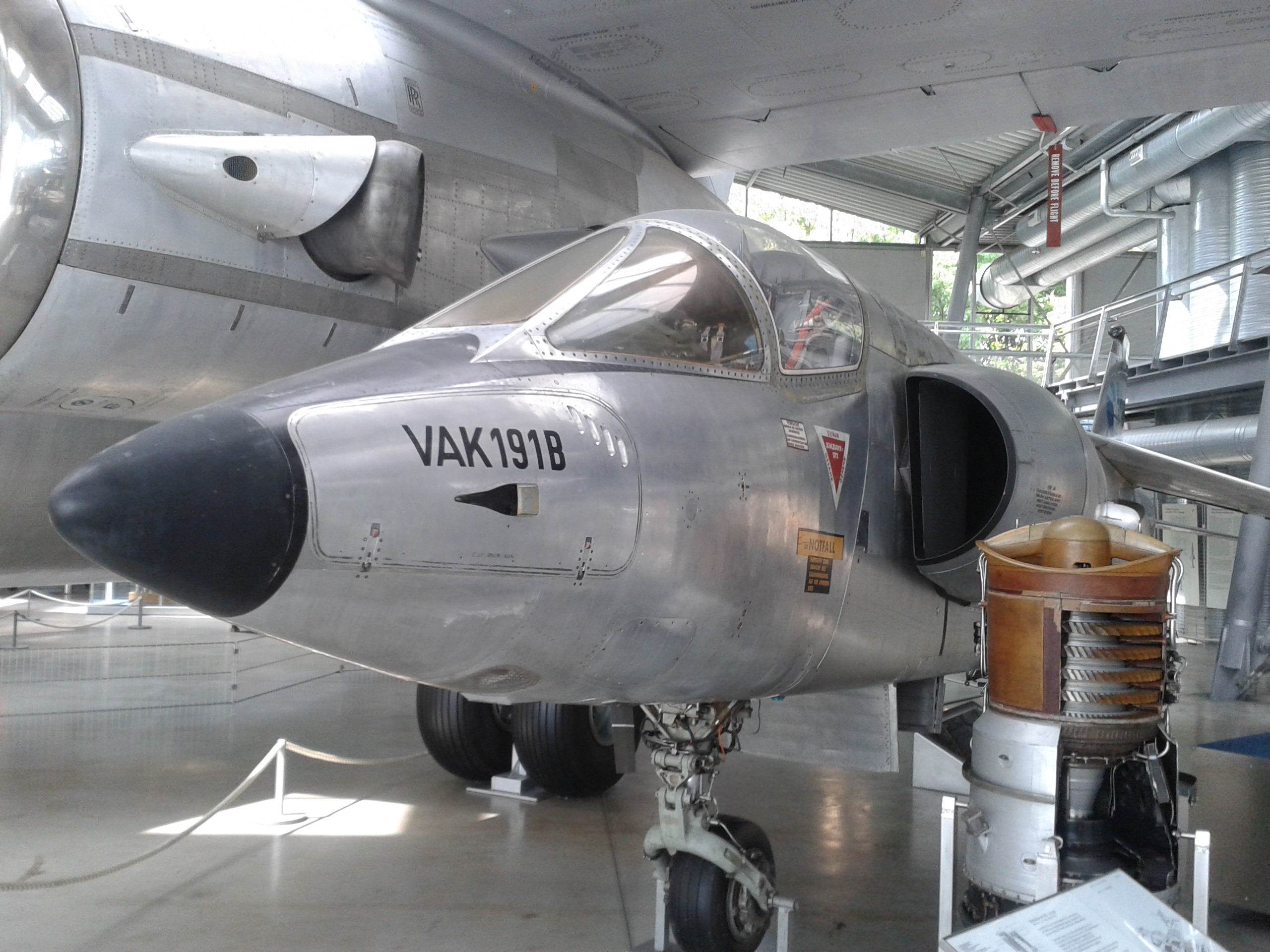
VFW VAK 191B on display at the Deutsches Museum Flugwerft Schleissheim

- EWR VJ 101
- Focke-Wulf FW.1262

Italy

- Fiat G95/4

United Kingdom

- Armstrong Whitworth AW.406
- English Electric P.39
- Short PD.45
- Short PD.49
- Short PD.56

USA

- Lockheed CL-704

Of these aircraft types only prototypes of the VJ 101 and VAK 191B were built and flown, they did not enter service. Examples of both types are on display in German aviation museums.

== VAK designs ==
By August 1962 it became clear that design projects were not progressing, the advisory committee concentrated on the subsonic fighter-bomber group and gave the VAK 191 designation to four types. (Note: VAK is an abbreviation for Vertikalstartendes Aufklärungs- und Kampfflugzeug (VTOL Reconnaissance and Strike Aircraft) and the '191' being a reference to the G.91.)

United Kingdom

- VAK 191A - Hawker P.1127 Mk 2

Germany

- VAK 191B - Focke Wulf Fw 1262 (VFW VAK 191B)
- VAK 191C - VJ 101D development of the EWR VJ 101

Italy

- VAK 191D - Fiat G.95/4

== ZELL/SATS ==
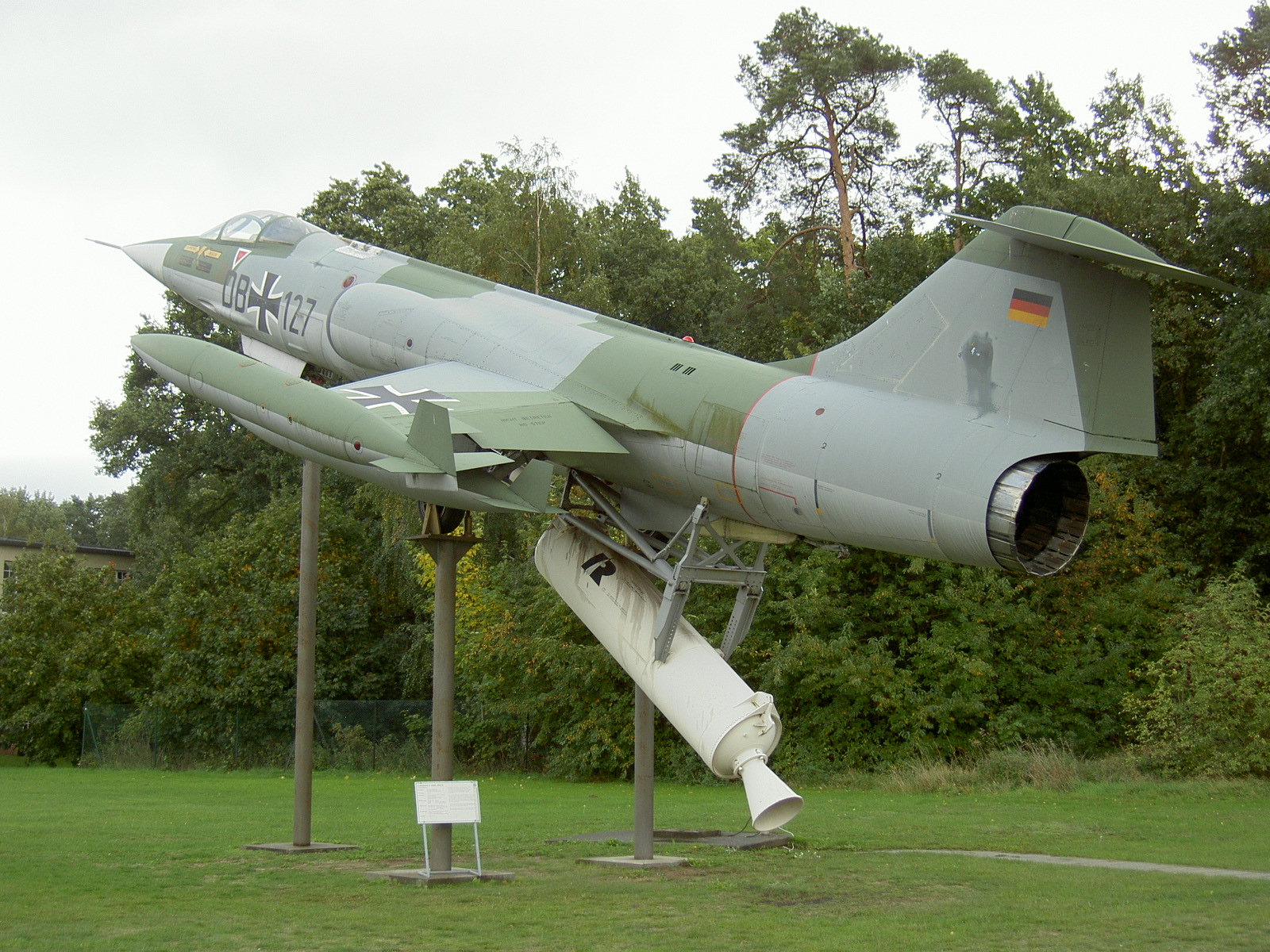
Lockheed F-104G Starfighter in ZELL launch attitude on display at the Militärhistorisches Museum Flugplatz Berlin-Gatow

The 'zero-length launch system' or 'zero-length take-off system' (ZLL, ZLTO, ZEL, or ZELL) was a system whereby jet fighters and attack aircraft were intended to be fitted with booster rockets and then mounted on mobile launch platforms, the booster rocket being jettisoned after launch. Zero length launch experiments had taken place in the 1950s, the system was adapted for the Lockheed F-104G Starfighter with test launches being carried out in the US and Germany. This concept was not part of NBMR-3 but was an alternative solution to the problem of dispersed field operations.

SATS (Short Airfield for Tactical Support) was a related test programme where F-104G aircraft were catapult launched from short land strips and recovered using arrestor gear, test launches were carried out at Lakehurst and Lechfeld in 1966.

Neither system was adopted due to complexity, logistics difficulties and a change in NATO strategy.

== NBMR-4 ==
NBMR-4 was a closely related requirement for V/STOL transport aircraft designs intended to support the fighter and fighter-bomber aircraft at dispersed operating bases. NBMR-22 was a revised specification reducing the range requirement to 500 km.

Specification NBMR-4 called for a transport aircraft able to carry 12,000 lb (5,440 kg) at over 200 knots (370 km/h) and climbing to 50 ft (15 m) in a horizontal distance of 500 ft (150 m).

=== Aircraft designs submitted (NBMR-4) ===
France

- Breguet 941

Canada

- De Havilland Canada DHC-4 Caribou

United Kingdom

- BAC 224
- de Havilland DH.129
- English Electric P.36
- English Electric P.41
- English Electric P.44

USA

- LTV XC-142

=== Aircraft designs submitted (NBMR-22) ===
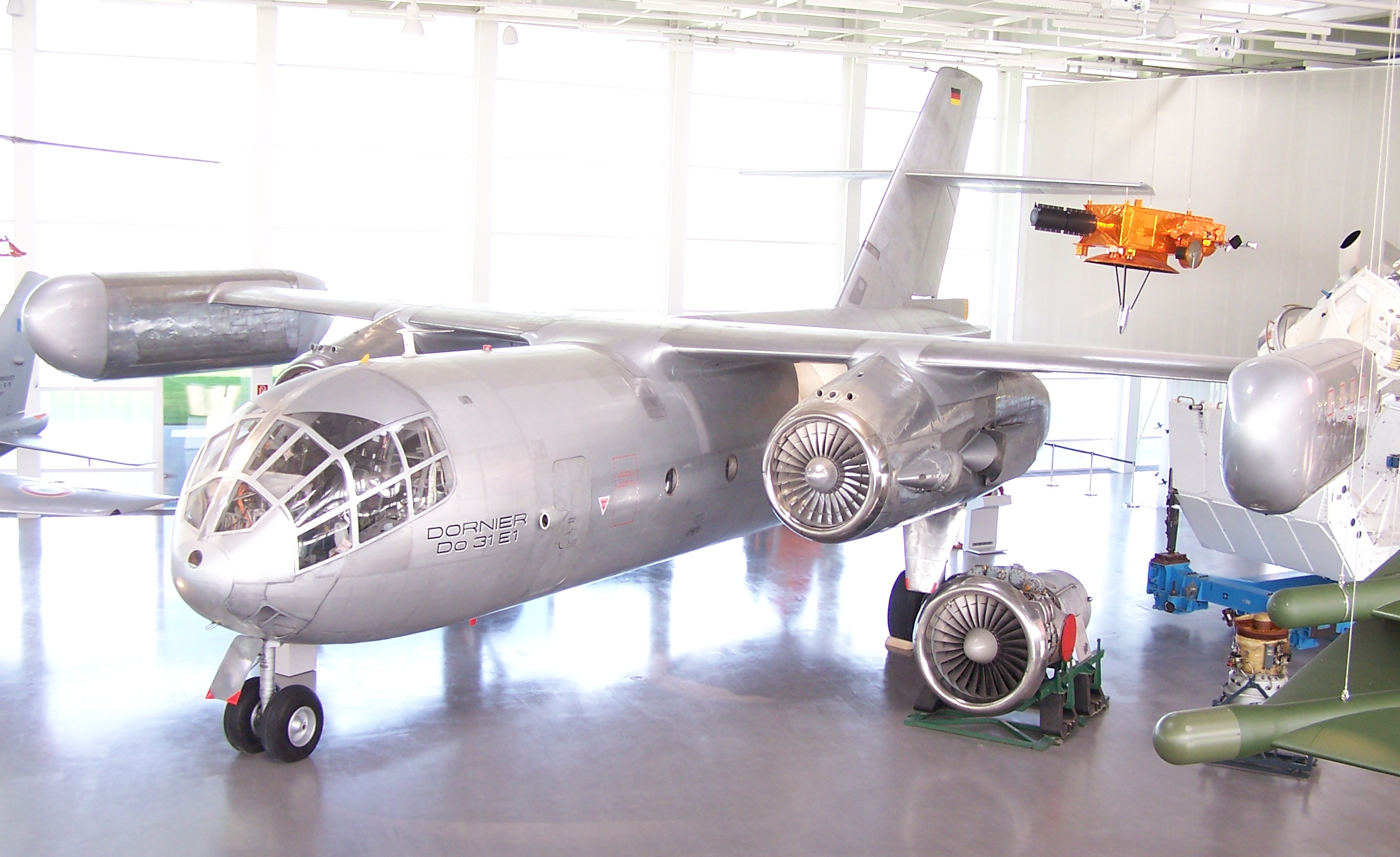
Dornier Do 31 on display at the Dornier Museum

Germany

- Dornier Do 31

Italy

- Fiat G.222

United Kingdom

- Armstrong Whitworth AW.681
- BAC P.43
- Bristol 208

The Fiat (now Aeritalia) G.222 was only adopted by Italy but is still in service, the Dornier Do 31 reached flight testing status but did not enter service.

== Aero engine development ==
The new aircraft types required advanced lift jet engines with high thrust-to-weight ratios, development programmes for new powerplants employing vectored thrust or vertically mounted pure lift engines ran concurrently with the aircraft designs.

Engine types included the Bristol Siddeley BS.100, Rolls-Royce Medway and Pegasus, Rolls-Royce/MAN Turbo RB153/RB193, Rolls-Royce RB.108 and the RB.162.

== End of programmes ==
All of the NATO requirements had been withdrawn by April 1967. Research flight testing continued with the Dornier Do 31 until the project was cancelled in 1970, VAK 191B flight testing continued into the early 1970s until the aircraft were retired.

The Fiat G.91 retired from German service in 1995 having been replaced by the Dassault/Dornier Alpha Jet and the Lockheed F-104G retiring in 1991, replaced with the Panavia Tornado.

== See also ==
- Hawker Siddeley P.1127
- Hawker Siddeley Harrier
- List of VTOL aircraft
