= Dassault Mirage IIIV =

French vertical take-off and landing prototype fighter aircraft

Mirage IIIV
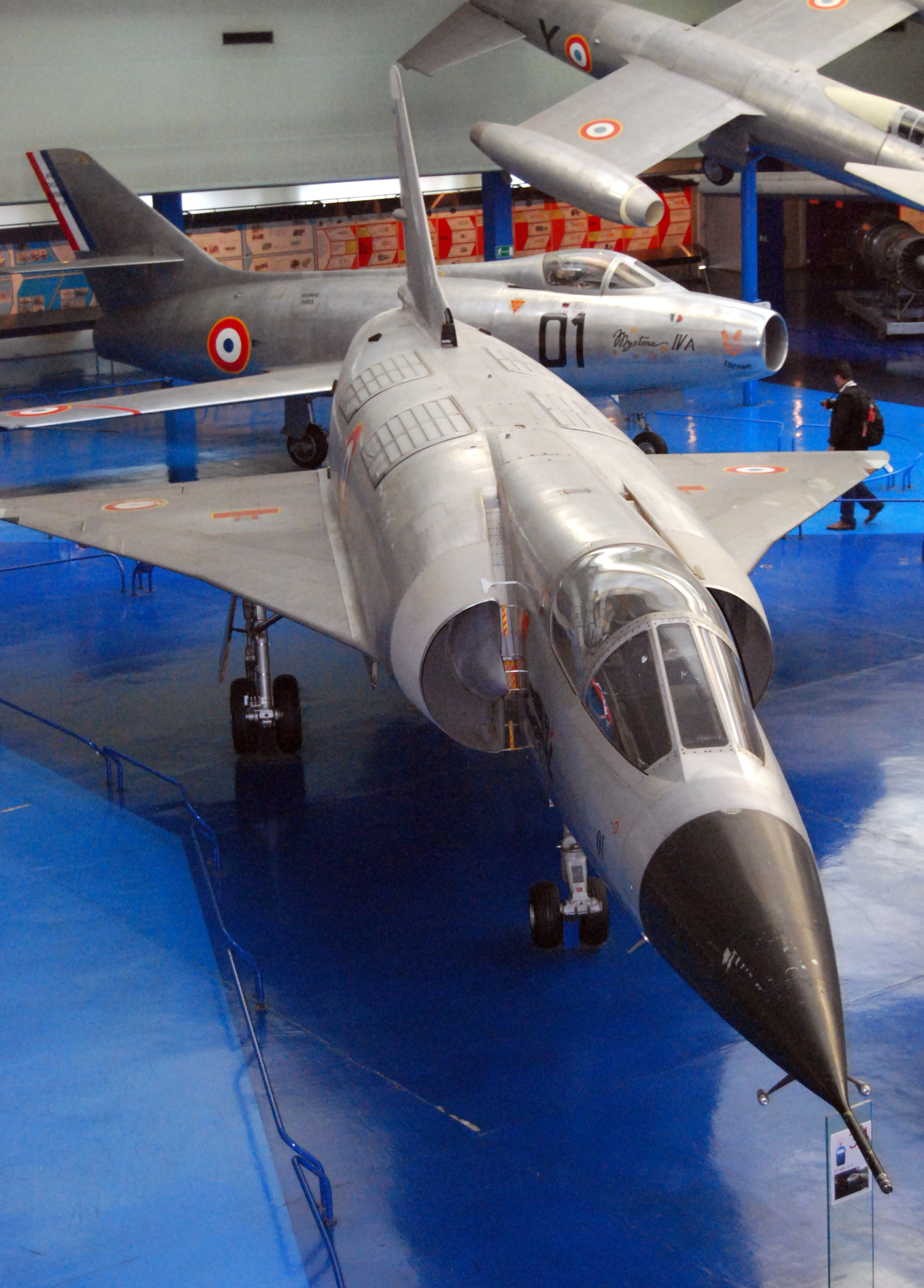
- Mirage IIIV at the Musée de l'Air et de l'Espace, Le Bourget, France

General information
- Type: VTOL fighter aircraft
- Manufacturer: Dassault Aviation
- Primary user: French Air Force
- Number built: 2

History
- Manufactured: 1965-1966
- First flight: 12 February 1965
- Developed from: Dassault Balzac V

The Dassault Mirage IIIV, also spelled Mirage III V, is a French vertical take-off and landing (VTOL) prototype fighter aircraft of the mid-1960s developed and produced by Dassault Aviation.

The Mirage IIIV was a VTOL derivative of an existing conventional fighter, the Dassault Mirage III; the principal difference between the two types was the addition of eight small vertical lift jets which straddled the main engine. These lift jets would have been used during vertical takeoffs and landings, but would have been inactive during horizontal flight. The Mirage IIIV had come about as a response to the issuing of a NATO specification, NATO Basic Military Requirement 3 (NBMR-3), which sought a supersonic-capable VTOL strike fighter.

The Mirage IIIV was a competitor with Hawker Siddeley's P.1154 VTOL fighter, a cousin of the Hawker Siddeley Harrier. Both aircraft competed to be selected to meet the NBMR-3 requirement. While the Mirage IIIV is commonly viewed as being more politically palatable due to an emphasis having been placed upon multinational development and manufacturing plans, the design of P.1154 (which only used a single engine) was seen as more straightforward and reliable. Ultimately the P.1154 was selected to meet the NBMR-3 requirement to the detriment of the Mirage IIIV. One of the two prototypes constructed was destroyed in an accident; shortly following its loss, the whole project was abandoned; the surviving aircraft has since been placed on public display.

== Design and development ==
=== Background ===
In August 1961, NATO released an updated revision of its VTOL strike fighter requirement, NATO Basic Military Requirement 3 (NBMR-3). Specifications called for a supersonic V/STOL strike fighter with a combat radius of 460 kilometres (250 nmi). Cruise speed was to be Mach 0.92, with a dash speed of Mach 1.5. The aircraft, with a 910-kilogram (2,000 lb) payload, had to be able to clear a 15-metre (50 ft) obstacle following a 150-metre (500 ft) takeoff roll. Victory in this competition was viewed being of a high importance at the time as it was seem as being potentially "the first real NATO combat aircraft".

During the 1950s and 1960, both French aircraft manufacturer Dassault Aviation and British aerospace company Hawker Siddeley Aviation (HSA) were deeply interested in vertical takeoff/landing (VTOL)-capable combat aircraft. HSA had already been keen to develop a new generation of combat aircraft that would be capable of supersonic speeds. HSA's chief aircraft designer Sir Sydney Camm decided that the company should investigate the prospects of developing and manufacturing a viable combat-capable vertical take-off and landing (VTOL) fighter aircraft. Along with the subsonic Hawker P.1127 fighter (which would become the Hawker Siddeley Harrier later on), a supersonic design, designated as the P.1150 was produced; however, the release of NBMR-3, and subsequent revisions to it, led to the P.1150 proposal being considered to be undersized and thus unsatisfactory, which led to a desire for a redesign. (Note: According to aviation author Derek Wood, the decision not to persist with the original P.1150 design was a "serious setback...it would have provided a first class basic type".) The new, larger aircraft design soon emerged, which was initially designated as P.1150/3 prior to being redesignated as the P.1154.

In January 1962, HSA submitted the proposed design of the P.1154 to NATO via the Ministry of Aviation. NBMR.3 attracted a total of eleven contenders, including Dassault's Mirage IIIV proposal, which would become viewed as the principal competitor to the P.1154. Substantial support for the Mirage IIIV came from Britain, work on the programme having involved the British Aircraft Corporation (BAC), while the Dassault-led design also held the favour of several members of the British Air Staff. While the P.1154 was judged to be technically superior, the Mirage IIIV had acquired a greater level of political palatability due to the co-operative development and production aspects proposed for the programme, under which work was to be distributed across a number of member nations.

In May 1962, the proposed P.1154 emerged as the winner of the NBMR.3 competition . According to aviation author Jeffort, the Mirage IIIV was rejected mainly because of its excessive complexity: using nine engines, compared to the P.1154's single-engine approach. However, the success of the P.1154 design did not lead to orders being placed for it. NATO lacked any central budget, instead relying on individual member nations to actually procure military equipment, contributing to the NBMR.3 selection going unheeded by all of the NATO member nations. Thus, in 1965, the NMBR.3 project was unceremoniously terminated.

While the French government formally withdrew its participation in NMBR.3, after the Mirage IIIV had been rejected, Dassault continued work towards the building of Mirage IIIV prototypes.

=== Dassault Balzac V ===
Since the Rolls-Royce RB162 lift engines which had been specified for the Mirage IIIV were not expected to be available before 1963, Dassault decided to modify the first Mirage III prototype into an interim VTOL testbed; in this configuration, it became the Balzac V. This was fitted with eight Rolls-Royce RB.108 lift engines along with a single unreheated Bristol Orpheus BOr 3 as the main engine. According to aerospace publication Flight International, a key goal for the Balzac prototype was to prove the autopilot system, which was identical to the unit which was proposed use with the Mirage IIIV, as well as the lift and transition system. The Balzac began tethered hovering on 12 October 1962 and achieved the first free hover only six days later. The first accelerating transition from vertical take-off to horizontal flight took place on its 17th sortie on 18 March 1963. The aircraft had two fatal accidents, one in January 1964 and one in September 1965. After the last accident the aircraft was not repaired.

=== Mirage IIIV prototypes ===
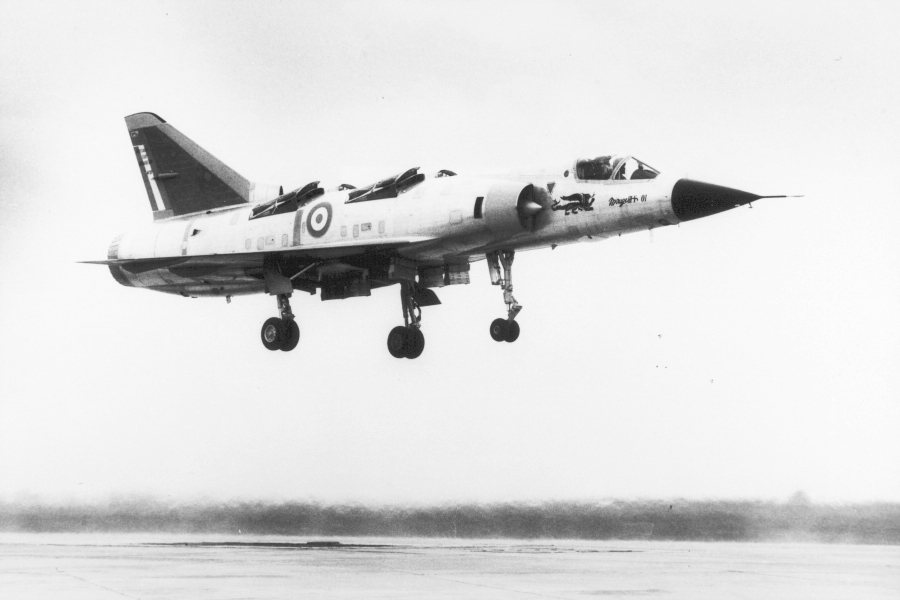
Dassault Mirage IIIV

Work on the Balzac assisted with the construction of the first prototype of the Mirage IIIV. This was roughly twice the size of the earlier aircraft. A pair of Mirage IIIV prototypes were constructed, the first of which conducted its first hovering trial on 12 February 1965. It was powered by a single Pratt & Whitney JTF10 turbofan engine, designated as the TF104. The TF104 engine was originally evaluated on a specially-constructed aerial testbed aircraft, the Mirage IIIT, which shared many similarities to basic design of the Mirage IIIC design, with the exception of modifications in order to accommodate the selected engine. The TF104 engine was quickly replaced by an upgraded TF106 engine, with thrust of 74.5 kN (16,750 lb_{f}), before the first prototype made its initial transition to forward flight in March 1966. The prototype subsequently attained Mach 1.32 during test flights.

In June 1966, the second prototype, which featured a TF306 turbofan engine for forward thrust of 82.4 kN (18,500 lb_{f}), conducted its first flight. During September of that year, it attained Mach 2.04 in level flight, but was lost in an accident on 28 November 1966. The Mirage IIIV was never able to take off vertically and successfully attain supersonic flight during the same flight.

The loss of the second prototype had effectively killed the program, and in fact killed any prospect of an operational Mach 2 vertical take-off fighter for decades. The competing Hawker P.1154 had been cancelled in 1965 by the government just as the prototypes were under construction; however, its subsonic cousin, the Hawker-Siddeley Kestrel VTOL attack aircraft was flying in tri-partite trials with the UK, US and West Germany. The French preferred the Mirage IIIV, and the international cooperation that would have been necessary to move the P.1154 into reality would never materialise.

Some of the P.1154 work contributed to the final operational vertical take-off fighter based on the Kestrel, the highly successful Harrier. The Mirage IIIV was never a realistic combat aircraft; the eight lift engines would likely have been a maintenance nightmare, and certainly their weight imposed a severe range and payload penalty on the aircraft.

== Design ==
The Dassault Mirage IIIV was a supersonic-capable vertical takeoff/landing (VTOL) fighter aircraft. It shared the general layout of earlier Mirage fighters, but featured a long and relative broad fuselage along with a bigger wing; the Mirage IIIV was considerably larger than contemporary fighter aircraft of its era. Akin to the earlier Balzac V testbed, the Mirage IIIV was outfitted with a total of nine engines: a single SNECMA-modified Pratt & Whitney JTF10 turbofan, designated TF104, capable of producing up to 61.8 kN (13,900 lb_{f}) of thrust, and eight Rolls-Royce RB162-1 engines, each being capable of generating a maximum of 15.7 kN (3,525 lbf) thrust, which were mounted vertically in pairs around the centreline.

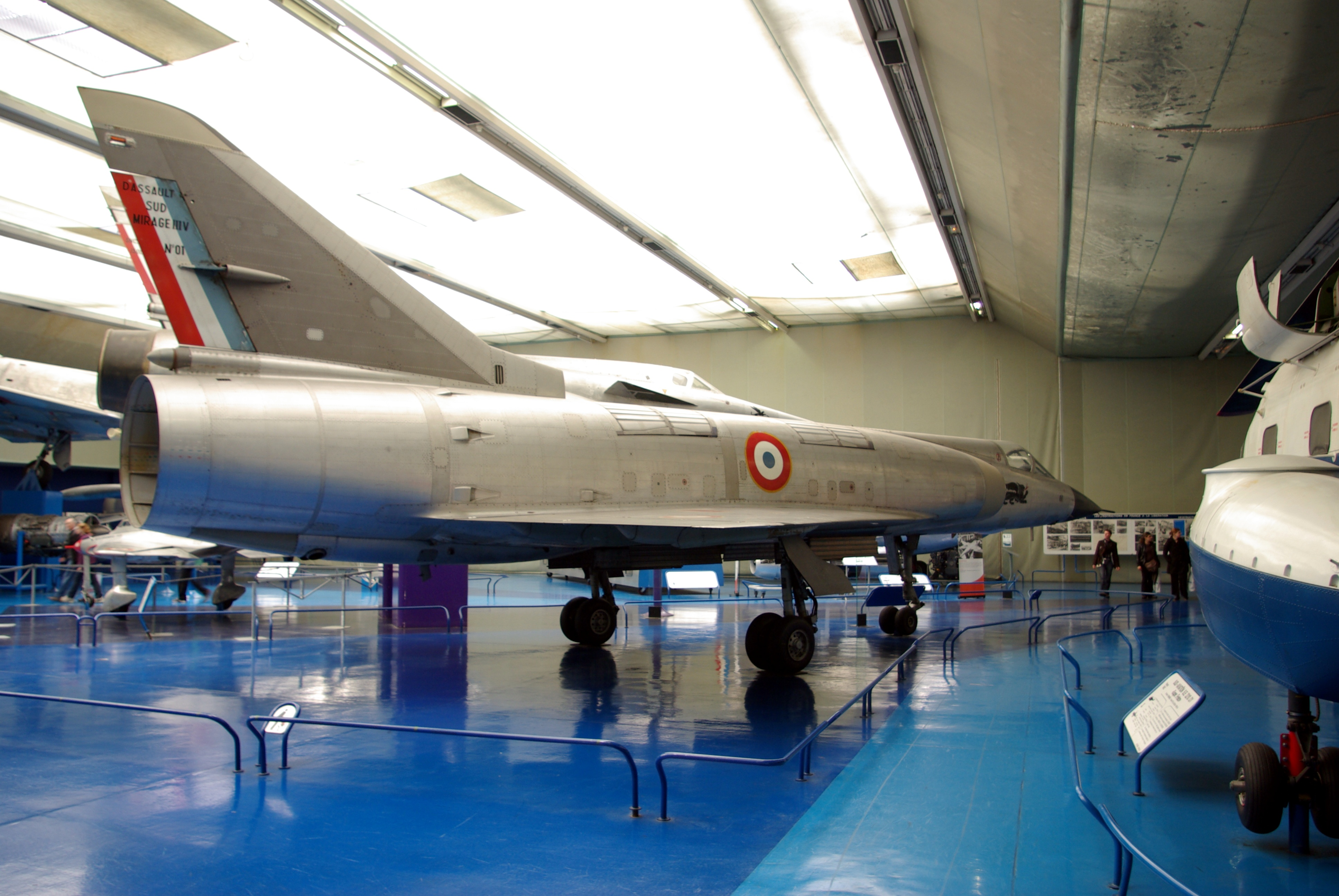
Dassault Mirage IIIV at Musée de l'Air et de l'Espace

A key design feature of the Mirage IIIV to improve vertical flight performance was the installation of movable thrust deflector doors ahead of the nozzles set in the aircraft's underside. These would be inclined 45° rearwards while on the ground, dispersing both debris and hot gasses away from the aircraft. As the engines accelerated to full power, these doors would automatically drop to a 90° position in order to obtain maximum lift thrust. According to Flight International, the Mirage IIIV had an advertised performance envelope in the vicinity of Mach 1.15 when flown at low altitude and Mach 2.3 when flown at height.

Throughout development, the electronics were given substantial attention; it was this element of the design that has been attributed as being a major contributing factor to the cost overruns which impacted the programme. Many elements of the cockpit and ancillary electronics of the Mirage IIIV were later reused on the conventional Mirage IIIF, which later re-designated as the Mirage F1.

== Specifications (Mirage IIIV-01) ==
Data from Modern Combat Aircraft 23 - Mirage

General characteristics

- Crew: 1
- Length: 18 m (59 ft 1 in)
- Wingspan: 8.72 m (28 ft 7 in)
- Height: 5.55 m (18 ft 3 in)
- Gross weight: 12,000 kg (26,455 lb)
- Powerplant: 1 × Pratt & Whitney/SNECMA TF104 afterburning turbofan engine cruise only, 88.26 kN (19,842 lbf) with afterburner
- Powerplant: 8 × Rolls-Royce RB162 turbojet engines, 19.61 kN (4,409 lbf) thrust each lift only

Performance

- Maximum speed: Mach 2.04

== See also ==
Related development

- Dassault Balzac V
- Dassault Mirage III
- Dassault Mirage F1

Aircraft of comparable role, configuration, and era

- EWR VJ 101
- Hawker Siddeley Harrier
- Hawker P.1154
- Rockwell XFV-12
- Yakovlev Yak-38
- Yakovlev Yak-141

Related lists

- List of military aircraft of France
- List of fighter aircraft
- List of VTOL aircraft
