= Rolls-Royce RB.145 =

1960s British turbojet aircraft engine

RB.145
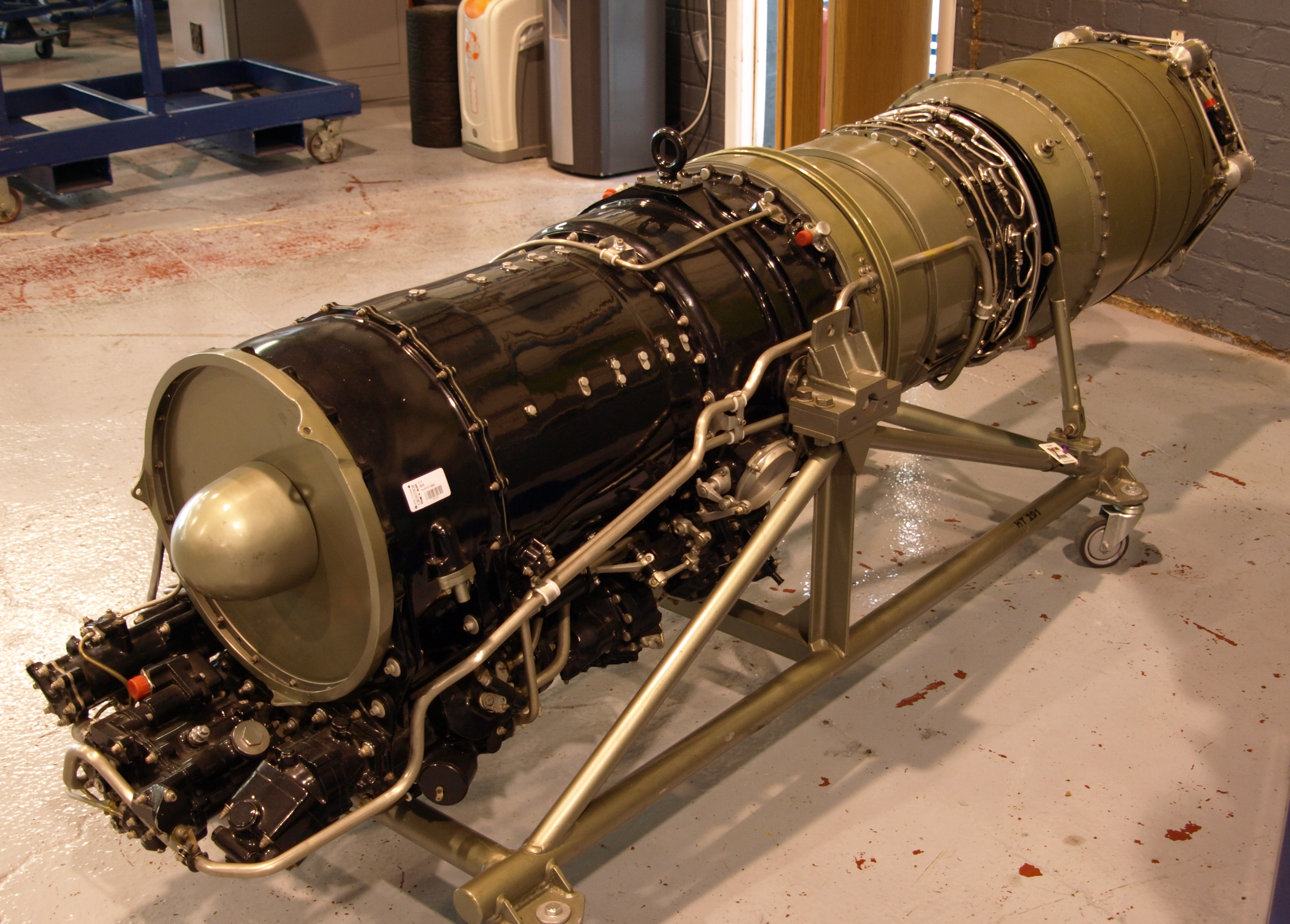
- Rolls-Royce RB.145 turbojet engine on display at the Rolls-Royce Heritage Trust, Derby
- Type: Turbojet
- National origin: United Kingdom
- Manufacturer: Rolls-Royce Limited
- First run: April 1961
- Major applications: EWR VJ 101
- Developed from: Rolls-Royce RB108

The Rolls-Royce RB.145 was a British jet engine designed in the early-1960s by Rolls-Royce for use as a lightweight VTOL lift and cruise engine. Developed from the Rolls-Royce RB108 the RB.145 featured more accessories and a higher thrust rating. Six engines developed by MAN Turbo were fitted to the first prototype of the EWR VJ 101 experimental German fighter aircraft, achieving supersonic flight by July 1964.

Reheated versions of the RB.145 with a thrust of 3,650 lb (16.2 kN) were fitted to the second EWR VJ 101 with the intention of reaching Mach 1.4.

== Variants ==
RB.145
Standard un-reheated turbojet
RB.145R
the RB.145 with reheat.

== Applications ==
- EWR VJ 101

== Specifications (RB.145R) ==
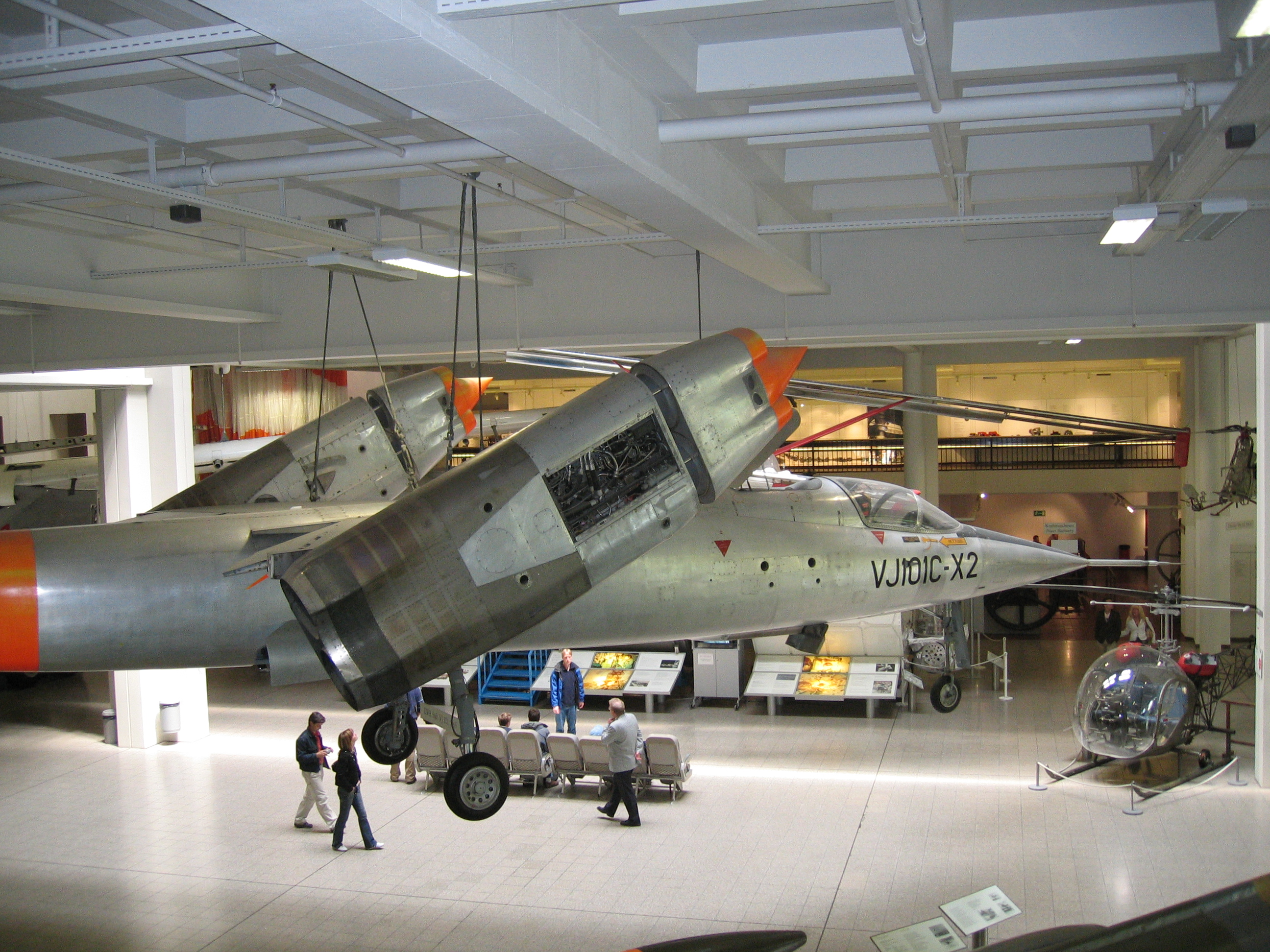
the translating engine nacelles of the VJ 101, fitted with two RB145s each.

Data from Aircraft engines of the World 1964/65.

==== General characteristics ====
- Type: Single spool turbojet
- Length: 103.5 in (263 cm)
- Diameter: 15.5 in (39 cm) (intake diameter)
- Dry weight: 600 lb (270 kg)

==== Components ====
- Compressor: Nine-stage axial-flow
- Combustors: Annular with duplex burners
- Turbine: 2-stage axial turbine
- Fuel type: JP-1 or JP-4
- Oil system: Return system at 35 psi (2.4 bar)

==== Performance ====
- Maximum thrust:

Take-off, wet: 3,650 lbf (16.2 kN)
Take-off, dry: 2,750 lbf (12.2 kN)

- Specific fuel consumption:

Wet:2.2 lb/lbf/h (220 kg/kN/h)
Dry:1 lb/lbf/h (100 kg/kN/h)

- Oil consumption: 0.5 lb/h (0.23 kg/h)
- Thrust-to-weight ratio: 6.08

== See also ==
- Rolls-Royce RB162

Related development

- Rolls-Royce RB108

Related lists

- List of aircraft engines
