= Entwicklungsring Süd =

Former German company

Entwicklungsring Süd (EWR) was a German consortium formed in 1959 to build a Mach 2 Vertical Take-Off Interceptor for the Luftwaffe.

== History ==
The consortium was formed in 1959 by the German aircraft companies Bölkow, Heinkel and Messerschmitt to develop a Mach 2 VTOL interceptor for the Luftwaffe. In 1964 Heinkel left the consortium and the following year it was formed as a company Entwicklungsring Süd GmbH. A VJ 101C prototype aircraft was built and flown in 1963 although it crashed on its 132nd flight, on 14 September 1964, during a normal horizontal take-off. The accident was found to have been caused by a roll-rate gyro which had been installed with reversed polarity. A modified second prototype flew in 1965 and it was planned to put an improved variant VJ 101D into production, but the development was stopped.

EWR teamed with Boeing, Fairchild, Hiller and Republic Aviation for the Advanced Vertical Strike (AVS).

== Products ==
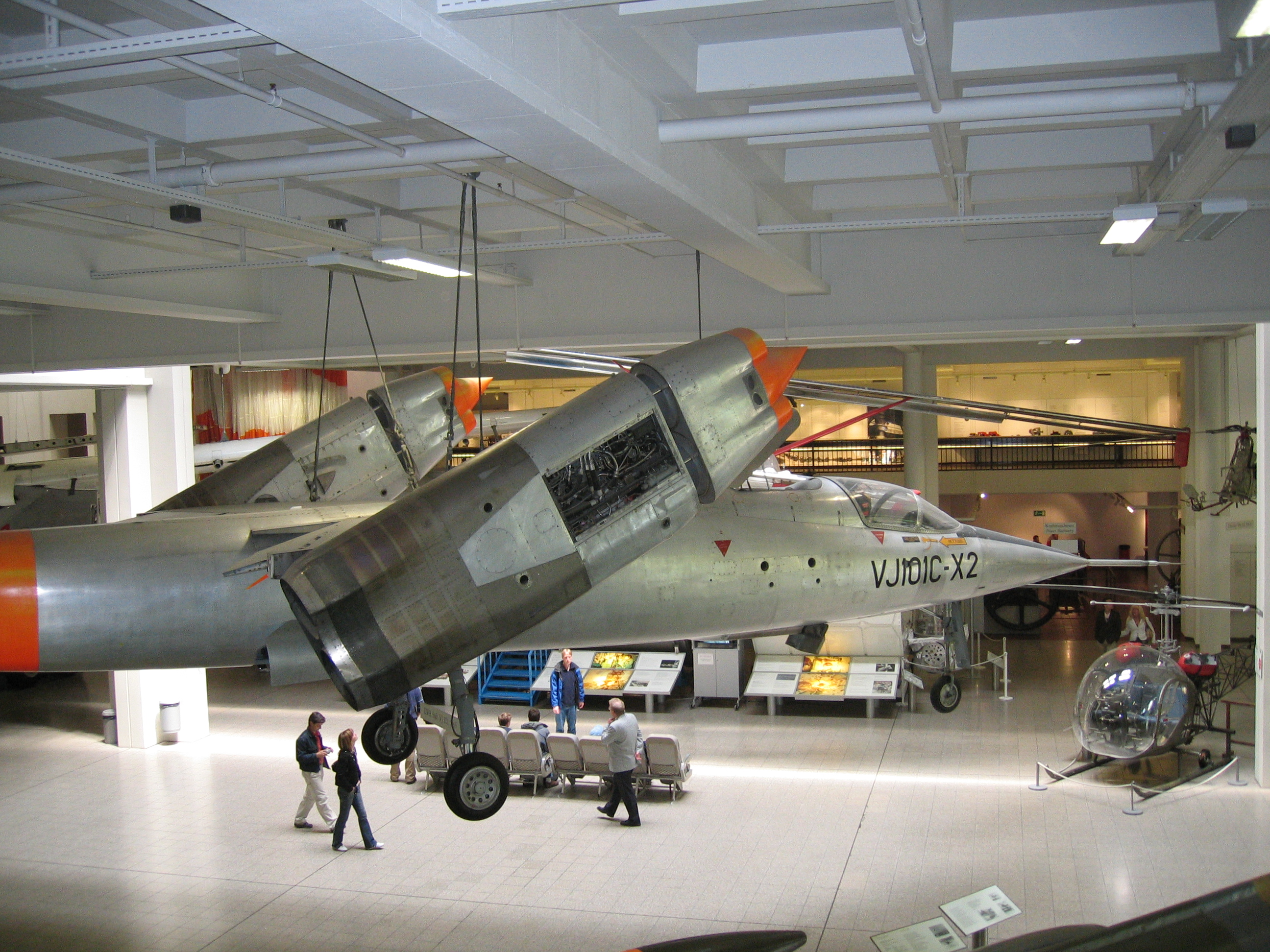
VJ 101C

- EWR VJ 101
