= Hawker Siddeley P.1154 =

Planned British V/STOL fighter aircraft

P.1154

General information
- Type: V/STOL combat aircraft
- National origin: United Kingdom
- Manufacturer: Hawker Siddeley
- Status: Cancelled, 1965
- Primary users: Royal Air Force (intended) Royal Navy (intended)

History
- Developed from: Hawker Siddeley P.1127

The Hawker Siddeley P.1154 was a planned supersonic vertical/short take-off and landing (V/STOL) fighter aircraft designed by Hawker Siddeley Aviation (HSA).

Development originally started under P.1150, which was essentially a larger and faster version of the basic layout and technology being developed by the smaller subsonic Hawker Siddeley P.1127/Kestrel. A key difference of this design was the addition of plenum chamber burning, essentially an afterburner-like arrangement in the thrusters used during hover, greatly increasing their thrust.

The release of NATO Basic Military Requirement 3 for a VTOL strike-fighter led to widespread industry participation. Hawker felt the P.1150 did not meet the requirements, so it was enlarged to become P.1150/3, and then renamed P.1154. This Mach 2-capable aircraft was the technical winner of the eleven submissions for NBMR-3, with the Dassault Mirage IIIV selected as a second design. Political infighting between the two groups and their various supporters, along with continual changing of the strategic environment, led to neither project progressing into production.

Meanwhile, Hawker Siddeley considered modifying the airframe for a joint specification for an aircraft by the RAF and Royal Navy. Between 1961 and 1965 the two services harmonised their specifications to preserve design commonality. However, the RAF's desired configuration was to take precedence over that of the Royal Navy's. A number of proposals were submitted; at one stage, a twin-Spey design was considered, then rejected. Following the Labour government's coming to power the project was cancelled in 1965. The Royal Navy would acquire the McDonnell Douglas F-4 Phantom II, while the RAF continued to foster development of the P.1127 (RAF), leading to the Harrier family.

== Development ==
=== Background ===
During the late 1950s, Hawker Siddeley Aviation (HSA) was keen to develop a new generation of combat aircraft that would be capable of supersonic speeds. Unfortunately, despite repeated attempts to revive the program, the in-development Hawker P.1121 fighter would ultimately be left unfinished, principally due to a lack of a political support for development following the release of the 1957 Defence White Paper by Minister of Defence Duncan Sandys. Recognising the need to promptly commence work on another development program, HSA's chief aircraft designer Sir Sydney Camm, who had been in regular discussions with Sir Stanley Hooker of Bristol Aero Engines, decided that the company should investigate the prospects of developing and manufacturing a viable combat-capable vertical take-off and landing (VTOL) fighter aircraft.

Bristol Aero Engines and Hooker had already been working on a project to produce a suitable VTOL engine; this engine combined major elements of their Olympus and Orpheus jet engines to produce a directable fan jet. The projected fan jet harnessed rotatable cold jets which were positioned on either side of the compressor along with rotatable 'hot' jets which was directed via a bifurcated tailpipe. With a suitable engine already being developed, Camm and his team at HSA proceeded to develop the company's first VTOL aircraft, designated as the Hawker Siddeley P.1127. The P.1127 was envisioned as a subsonic VTOL-capable strike aircraft, while also serving to demonstrate and prove the capabilities of the aircraft's basic configuration and to validate the performance of the Rolls-Royce Pegasus engine that powered it.

While financial backing was issued by NATO's Mutual Weapons Development Program to support development of the Pegasus engine, the British government were not forthcoming with funding. While HSA chose to go ahead with the P.1127 as a private venture, the Air Staff disagreed heavily over what requirements should be set out for a future RAF VTOL aircraft; some officers, such as the Chief of the Air Staff Sir Thomas Pike, advocated simplicity while others, such as the RAF operational requirements division, sought various performance demands of such an aircraft, particularly the capacity for supersonic flight. HSA was also interested in the prospects and feasibility of a more sophisticated development of the P.1127, knowing that a supersonic-capable VTOL aircraft would likely be more attractive to customers, there being a general perception at the time that supersonic aircraft held significantly more value than their subsonic counterparts.

Consequently, on 13 April 1961, HSA decided to conduct preliminary work on a supersonic derivative of the P.1127 under the guidance of Ralph Hooper. This would result in a new design, designated P.1150, which was 50% larger than the preceding P.1127; it was proposed that a new performance-enhancing feature be adopted in the form of the plenum chamber burning (PCB) – similar to an afterburner, but acting only on the bypass air that discharged through the front nozzles. The P.1150 proposal broadly resembled its P.1127 predecessor despite major changes being made, including its revised fuselage, the adoption of a thinner wing, and an advanced version of the Pegasus engine. The Bristol Siddeley BS100 engine was equipped with a similar arrangement of four swivelling exhaust nozzles, the front nozzles of which were to be equipped with PCB. According to aviation author Derek Wood, the P.1150 was to have been capable of Mach 1.3.

=== NATO requirements ===
In August 1961, NATO released an updated revision of its VTOL strike fighter requirement, NATO Basic Military Requirement 3 (NBMR-3). Specifications called for a supersonic V/STOL strike fighter with a combat radius of 460 kilometres (250 nmi). Cruise speed was to be Mach 0.92, with a dash speed of Mach 1.5. The aircraft, with a 910-kilogram (2,000 lb) payload, had to be able to clear a 15-metre (50 ft) obstacle following a 150-metre (500 ft) takeoff roll. Victory in this competition was viewed being of a high importance at the time as it was seem as being potentially "the first real NATO combat aircraft". However, due to changes made to the requirement, the P.1150 was considered undersized and thus unsatisfactory, which led to a desire for a redesign. Wood views the decision not to persist with the original P.1150 design a "serious setback...it would have provided a first class basic type".

HSA formed an agreement with the German Focke-Wulf aircraft company to collaborate on a joint study that looked into the issue of equipping the P.1150 with two additional lift engines. However, in October 1961, West Germany elected to entirely withdraw from the programme. This was a blow directly felt not only by HSA and the development team, but by the British Air Ministry, who had been also seeking to collaborate with its West German counterparts on the VTOL aircraft. Meanwhile, further studies served to confirm fears the P.1150 would be too small to meet customer specifications, so Camm initiated work on an enlarged derivative design. In conjunction with HSA's redesign, Bristol worked to enlarge the original PCB engine and raise the exhaust heat to increase thrust to 146.8 kN (30,000 lbf). It could have theoretically reach speeds of up to Mach 1.7–2.

The new, larger aircraft design soon emerged, initially designated P.1150/3, then redesignated P.1154. In January 1962, HSA submitted the P.1154 design to NATO via the Ministry of Aviation. NBMR.3 also attracted ten other contenders, among which was P.1154's principal competitor, the Dassault Mirage IIIV. The Mirage IIIV was supported by British Aircraft Corporation (BAC), and also had the favour of several members of the Air Staff. In May 1962, the P.1154 emerged as the winner in the competition for the NBMR.3.

While the P.1154 was judged to be technically superior, the Mirage acquired a greater level of political palatability due to the co-operative development and production aspects proposed for the programme, which spread work across a number of member nations. Protracted political maneuvering by firms and national governments alike was deployed in attempts to secure their respective project's selection. The P.1154 was ultimately selected to meet NBMR-3, but this did not lead to orders being placed. The French government subsequently withdrew from participation once the Dassault design lost. (Note: The Mirage IIIV had been rejected mainly because of its excessive complexity, using nine engines compared to the P.1154's single-engine approach.) NATO lacked any central budget, relying on individual member nations to actually procure military equipment, and the NBMR-3 selection went unheeded by all of these nations. Thus, in 1965, the whole project was terminated.

=== RAF and Royal Navy requirements ===
On 6 December 1961, prior to the design being submitted to NATO, it was decided that the P.1154 would be developed with the requirements for use by both the RAF and the Royal Navy. In February 1962, the Royal Navy's Admiralty received the aircraft concept with great interest as the Royal Navy was in the process of seeking a new interceptor aircraft for use on their aircraft carriers at the time. By March 1962, the Ministry of Defence was openly interested in the potential for the P.1154 being adopted as a replacement for both the RAF's fleet of Hawker Hunters and the Royal Navy's de Havilland Sea Vixens. Accordingly, in April 1962, a first draft of a new joint Naval/Air Staff requirement was issued in the form of Specification OR356/AW406, to which HSA had submitted a response by June of that year. Following the cancellation of the NBMR-3 requirement, HSA focused all its attention onto working upon this joint requirement.

The services sought different characteristics in their aircraft – the RAF desired a single-seat fighter with secondary intercept capability, while the Fleet Air Arm (FAA) sought a two-seat interceptor capable of secondary low-level strike capability. Accordingly, HSA's submission involved the development of two distinct variants of the same P.1154 aircraft, each aimed towards a particular service and its stated requirements. Although financially and politically committed to a joint requirement with the Royal Navy, the RAF's single-seat design took precedence over the two-seat version of the Royal Navy. However, RAF P.1154s would have to accommodate the Navy's large airborne intercept (AI) radar. When HSA submitted the design on 8 August, the Royal Navy criticised the proposal, which had a tandem undercarriage layout incompatible with catapult operations; consequently, a tricycle undercarriage design was investigated and accepted as practical. The aircraft would have been armed with the Red Top missile.

In November 1962, Rolls-Royce offered a PCB-equipped vectored thrust twin-Spey design as an alternative to the BS100. This alternative engine arrangement was widely seen as inferior, particularly due to the danger posed by asymmetric thrust output if a single engine failure occurred; however, Rolls-Royce claimed that their solution could be available sooner than the BS100 would be. In December 1962, Bristol performed the first successful run of a PCB-equipped Pegasus 2 engine. In order to perform a vertical takeoff, the use of PCB was necessitated; however, this feature would have come at the cost of significant ground erosion during operations.

In December 1962, HSA dedicated its full effort to developing the RAF's single seat variant; Wood notes the starting point for which was broadly similar to the proposal submissions for NBMR-3. On 18 February 1963, Julian Amery, the Minister of Aviation, confirmed that the project study contract had been placed; on 25 March, Amery announced that the BS100 had been selected as the powerplant to be used on the P.1154. At this point, the program was envisioned to involve the ordering of a total of 600 aircraft, 400 for the RAF and 200 for the Royal Navy. However, as HSA carried out further work on the detailed design phase of the programme, it was becoming clear that opinions on the internal equipment for the aircraft varied substantially between the two services.

The difficulty of handling the divergent requirements was compounded when, in May 1963, shortly following on from the official issuing of Specification OR356/AW406, the option of having two distinct aircraft was rejected; the Secretary of State for Defence, Peter Thorneycroft, had insisted upon the development of a single common aircraft to meet the requirements of both services. According to Wood, Thorneycroft's decision had been influenced by the American General Dynamics F-111 multirole program, and had sought to duplicate this development concept for the P.1154. Despite a stated Navy preference for a swing-wing fighter, the services agreed that the aircraft would be completely common, with the exception of different radar systems. However, upon requests by various electronics manufacturers to the Ministry of Aviation to be issued with the requirements for the electronics fit, no response was ever issued; this lack of leadership proved disruptive to the overall programme.

=== Disfavour and cancellation ===
As a consequence of the diverging requirements of the RAF and Royal Navy, the aircraft's development had started to stumble. As a result of modifications towards meeting the naval requirements having been performed, by July 1963, weight gain had become a considerable issue for the aircraft. By that point, the Royal Navy was expressly criticising the choice of a V/STOL aircraft. By August 1963, HSA was openly expressing the view that the range of changes being made to the aircraft was damaging its potential for export sales. At the same time, the Navy stated that it regarded the P.1154 to be a second-rate interceptor, and the RAF openly decried the loss of strike performance. By October 1963, the Ministry of Aviation was concerned with the project's progress, and noted that the effort to combine a strike aircraft and a fighter in a single aircraft, and trying to fit that same airframe to both of the services, was "unsound".

By October 1963, according to Wood, the situation had become critical and some officials were beginning to examine alternative options, such as conventional fighter aircraft in the form of the McDonnell Douglas F-4 Phantom II. By November 1963, the RAF reportedly still found the P.1154 to be a suitable platform, while the Royal Navy appeared to be considering the F-4 Phantom II as being a better fit for its needs. In response, HSA elected to focus its efforts on the RAF version. In late 1963, dissatisfied with the progress of the 'bi-service' model, the government examined three alternative options for the programme: to proceed with an RAF-orientated P.1154 while the Naval version would be delayed, pursue the development of a full dual-service P.1154 model with only limited differences between the services, or the complete termination of the program with the service's requirements to be re-appraised.

In November 1963, the Sunday Telegraph publicly announced that the bi-service P.1154 had been aborted. Wood attributes Thorneycroft's ambition to reconcile the requirements of the two services into the one model and insistence on this vision as having "put the whole project in jeopardy". Around this point, the Royal Navy expressed their open preference for the F-4 Phantom II and soon Thorneycroft conceded that the service would get this aircraft instead, and that development of the P.1154 would continue to meet the RAF's requirement. On 26 February 1964, it was announced in the House of Commons by the Conservative government that a development contract had been placed for the P.1154, equipped with the BS100 engine, as an RAF strike aircraft. At the same time, it was announced that the Naval requirement would instead be met by Spey-engined Phantoms. Wood stated that this decision was "the beginning of the end for the 1154 as the original operation requirement was for joint-service use".

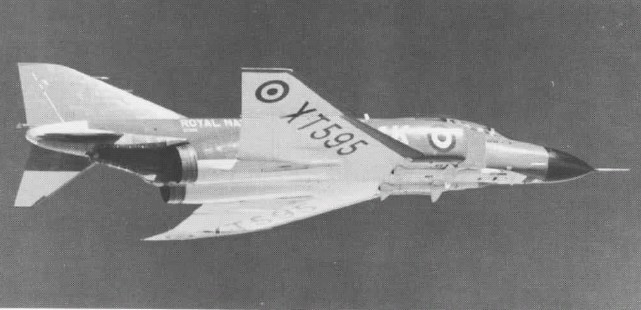
Royal Navy was to be allowed to purchase the F-4 Phantom II, instead of the P.1154 which was later cancelled.

In the aftermath of the government announcement, HSA persisted with work on the P.1154. By September 1964, the first full-scale mock-up meeting had been conducted. On 30 October 1964, a milestone in the development programme was attained when the first run of a BS100 engine was performed; around the same time, HSA received favourable reports that the P.1154 was competitive with the performance of other aircraft, including the F-4 Phantom II.

The P.1154 ultimately became a victim of the incoming Labour government, led by Harold Wilson. In November 1964, Wilson's government informed the Air Staff to prepare to cancel two of three specific ongoing development projects, these being the P.1154, the BAC TSR-2 strike aircraft, and the Hawker Siddeley HS.681 V/STOL transport aircraft; in order to save the TSR-2 programme, the RAF was satisfied to abandon the P.1154. On 2 February 1965, it was announced that the P.1154 had been terminated on the grounds of cost. At the time of cancellation, at least three prototypes had reached various stages of construction. (Note: Quote:"At Hamble, work began in early January 1965 on jigging the first pair of wings; two more sets were underway by the end.") Following the cancellation, the RAF adopted the F-4 Phantom II (as ordered by the RN) instead; however, the government also issued a contract for continued work on the original subsonic P.1127 (RAF), which led to the Harrier; this name had originally been reserved for the P.1154 should it have entered service.

In retrospect, aviation author Tony Buttler considered the cancellation of the aircraft to be justified, noting the time-consuming and expensive failures of attempts by other nations (such as Soviet/Russia's Yak-41 and West Germany's EWR VJ 101) at a supersonic VTOL aircraft. These aircraft all used a multiple engines configuration like the Mirage IIIV, and not the single vectored thrust turbofan of the likes of the BS.100 and Pegasus which went on to great success in the Harrier. Wood described the overall situation as: "From start to finish the P.1154 programme was a story of delay, ministerial interference and indecision... the P.1150 would now be the ideal aircraft for the new generation through-deck cruisers"

== Specifications (P.1154 – RAF version) ==
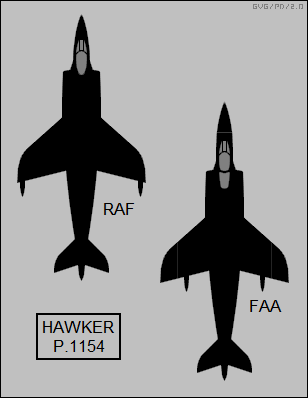
Planform silhouettes of the P.1154, with the single-seat RAF version on the left and tandem, two-seat Royal Navy Fleet Air Arm version on the right

Data from The British Fighter since 1912

General characteristics

- Crew: 1
- Length: 49 ft 5 in (15.06 m)
- Wingspan: 24 ft 0 in (7.32 m)
- Max takeoff weight: 30,970 lb (14,048 kg)
- Powerplant: 1 × Bristol Siddeley BS.100/9 Plenum-chamber burning vectored thrust turbofan engine, 33,000 lbf (150 kN) with afterburner

Performance

- Maximum speed: Mach 1.3 at sea level

M2.0 at altitude

- Service ceiling: 49,000 ft (15,000 m)

Armament

- Hardpoints: 4 , with provisions to carry combinations of:
  - Missiles: Red Top
  - Bombs: 2 x 1000 lb bombs

== See also ==
Related development

- Hawker Siddeley P.1127/Kestrel
- Hawker Siddeley Harrier
- British Aerospace Harrier II
- British Aerospace P.1216
- British Aerospace P.125

Aircraft of comparable role, configuration, and era

- Dassault Mirage IIIV
- EWR VJ 101
- Yakovlev Yak-141
