= EWR VJ 101 =

Experimental aircraft by Entwicklungsring Süd

VJ 101
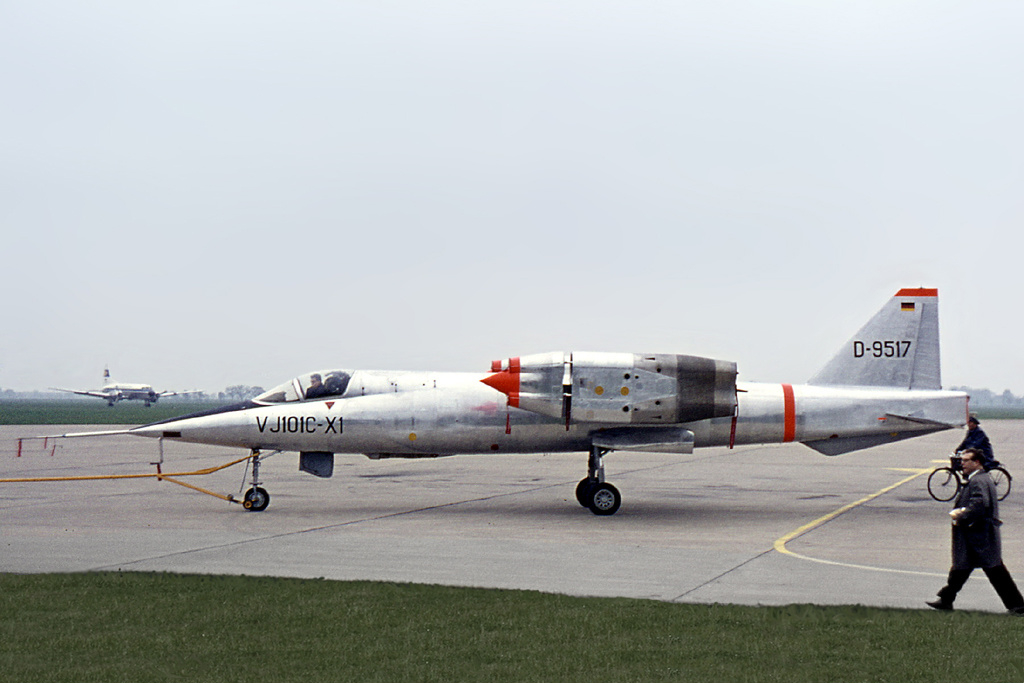
- The EWR VJ101C, X-1 prototype, April 1964

General information
- Type: V/STOL fighter
- Manufacturer: EWR
- Status: Cancelled
- Number built: 2

History
- First flight: 10 April 1963
- Retired: 1968

The EWR VJ 101 was an experimental West German jet fighter vertical takeoff/landing (VTOL) tiltjet aircraft. VJ stood for Versuchsjäger, (German for "Experimental Fighter"). The 101 was one of the first V/STOL designs to have the potential for eventual Mach 2 flight.

During the 1950s, as various nations took an interest in developing VTOL-capable aircraft, the German Federal Government issued a request to the nation's recently revived aviation industries for them to study possible designs for such aircraft. In response, in 1960, German engine manufacturer MAN Turbo commenced work on a suitable engine in close cooperation with British engine manufacturer Rolls-Royce Limited. Likewise, aircraft firms Heinkel, Bölkow and Messerschmitt performed their own studies before coming together to form a joint venture company, EWR, for the purpose of developing and manufacturing their design for a supersonic VTOL fighter aircraft, which was soon designated as the VJ 101 D. The Federal Ministry of Defence (BMVg) were suitably impressed to place an order for a pair of experimental prototypes to be produced to demonstrate the design's capabilities.

A pair of prototype aircraft, collectively known as the VJ 101 C and individually known as the X-1 and X-2, were constructed and participated in a five-year test program. The intention was for the VJ 101 to eventually be developed as the basis for a successor for the Luftwaffe's inventory of American Lockheed F-104G Starfighter interceptors. However, development of the VJ 101 C was greatly complicated by the changing requirements of the BMVg, who decided to transform the aircraft's envisioned mission profile from the interceptor role to a more general fighter instead, greatly changing the performance requirements for it to fulfil. During 1968, development of the VJ 101 was ultimately cancelled.

== Design and development ==
=== Background ===
During the 1950s, rapid advances in the field of jet propulsion, particularly in terms of increased thrust and compact engine units, had contributed to an increased belief in the technical viability of vertical takeoff/landing (VTOL) aircraft, particularly within Western Europe and the United States. During 1950s and 1960s, multiple programmes in Britain, France, and the United States were initiated; likewise, aviation companies inside West Germany were keen not to be left out of this emerging technology. Shortly after 1957, the year in which the post-Second World War ban upon West Germany operating and developing combat aircraft was lifted, German aviation firms Dornier Flugzeugwerke, Heinkel, and Messerschmitt, having also been allowed to resume their own activities that same year, received an official request from the German Federal Government that urged them to perform investigative work on the topic of VTOL aircraft and to produce concept designs.

As such, multiple companies commenced work on their own conceptual designs for VTOL-capable interceptor aircraft; in order for these designs to be operationally relevant and viable, it was recognised that it would be necessary for the flight performance to equal that of conventional interceptors of the era, such as the modern Lockheed F-104G Starfighter In conjunction, Germany's Federal Ministry of Defence (BMVg) championed for the merger of the competing companies; it deliberately withheld the issuing of a development contract in order to incentivise companies to undertake such activities.

In conjunction with these efforts, German engine manufacturer MAN Turbo received a contract from the BMVg to conduct their own work into addressing the specific issues surrounding VTOL-capable engines. It was quickly realised that such efforts would require working with a foreign engine manufacturer; as such, during March 1960, an initial agreement of co-operation was signed between MAN Turbo and British engine manufacturer Rolls-Royce Limited. Under the terms of the 10-year contract established, Germany would acquire knowledge of the latest advances in jet engine technology via Rolls-Royce, as well a joint-development arrangement under which work would be shared, production conflicts minimised, and mutual consensus reached on key decisions. In March 1960, the BMVg issued a development contract to MAN Turbo for a light single-spool turbojet engine, while Rolls-Royce would serve as a major subcontractor on the project; the result of their collaborative efforts for the contract would be the Rolls-Royce/MAN Turbo RB153 turbofan engine.

The RB.153 engine was initially a relatively straightforward scaled-up version of the earlier Rolls-Royce RB108 engine that had been developed for sustained supersonic flight; however, during early 1960, interest in the engine’s further development as a suitable powerplant for a VTOL aircraft emerged. Consequently, new models of the engine were developed to address the specific requirements of its new VTOL role, including the RB.153.17 and the RB.153.25 lift engine. However, during December 1961, as a result of changes in the BMVg's priorities for the envisioned VTOL, considerable engine changes were necessitated in respond; as such, development work on the RB.153 was effectively shelved in favour of the Rolls-Royce RB145 engine.

=== Proposal ===
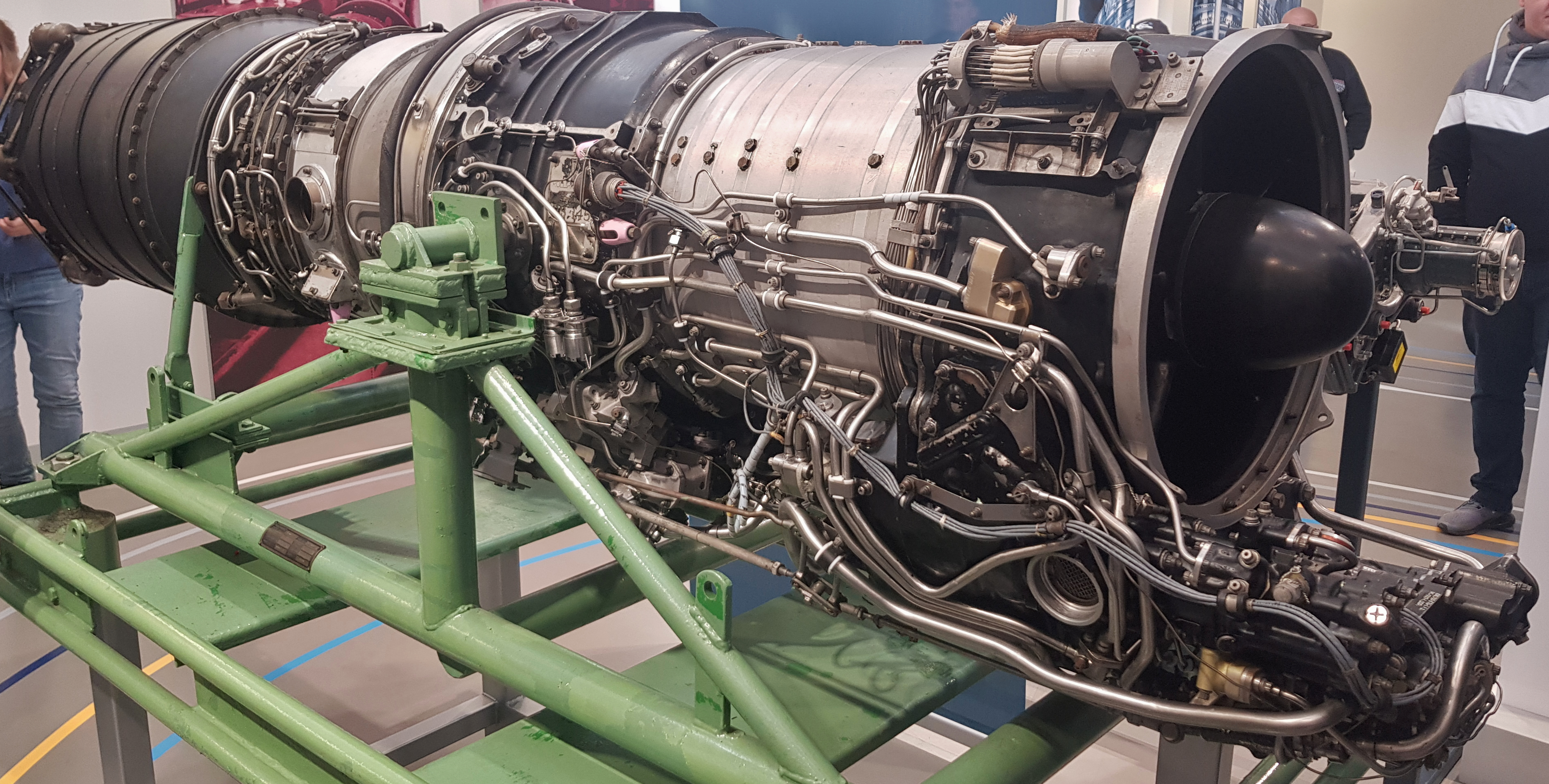
RB145R engine

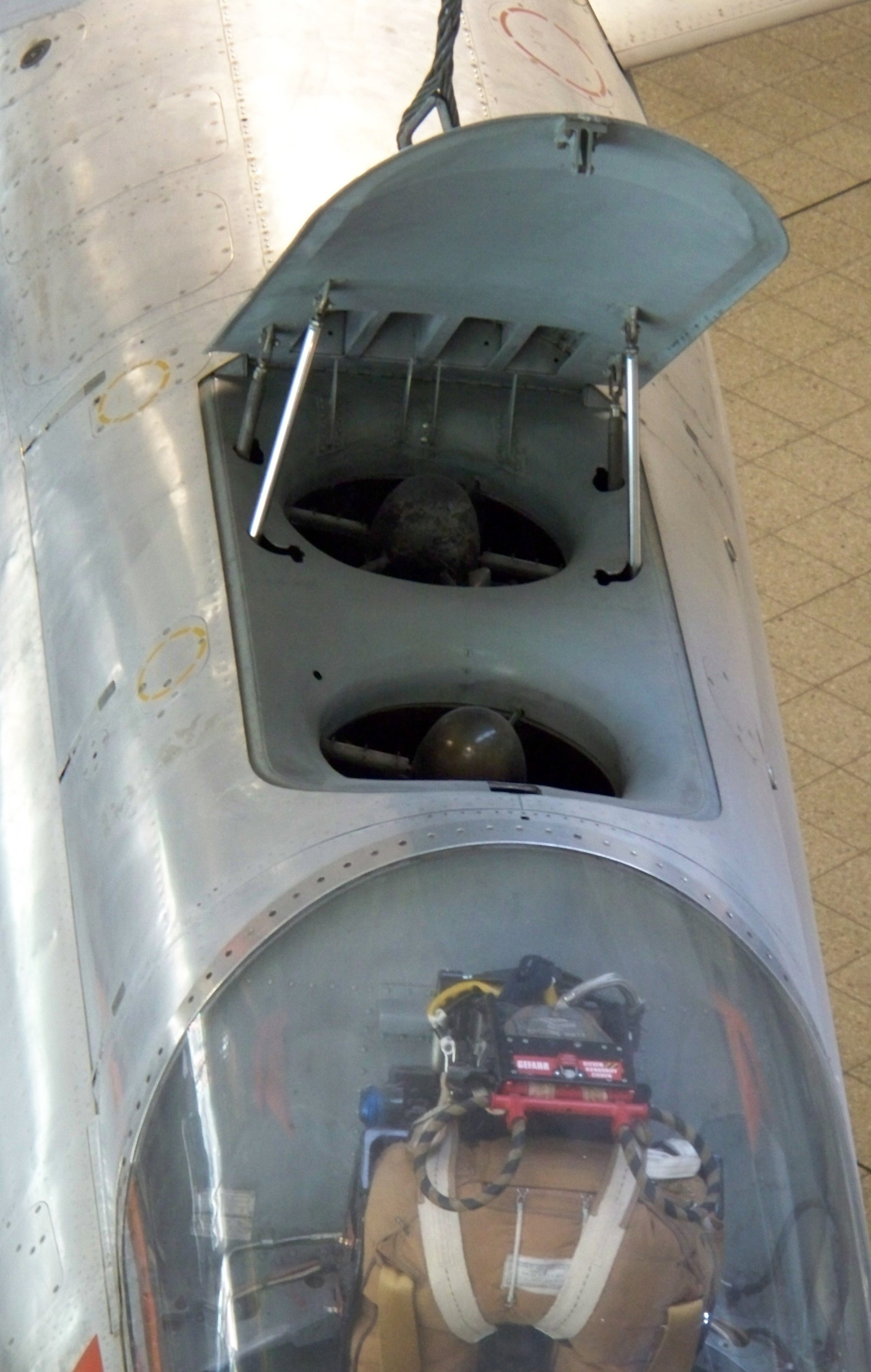
Top view, showing the air intake for the two fuselage lift engines

Both Heinkel (based on Heinkel He 231) and Messerschmitt (Messerschmitt Me X1-21) had developed designs to meet the requirements of VTOL flight and by 1959, the two companies, along with Bölkow, had created a joint venture company, called EWR, to develop and manufacture an envisioned supersonic fighter aircraft, designated as the VJ 101 D. As conceived, the production VJ 101 D aircraft was to be powered by the Rolls-Royce/MAN Turbo RB153 engine, which was to be equipped with thrust deflection apparatus. During late 1960, EWR presented their VJ 101 D concept to the BMVg. After performing a review of the proposal, the BMVg decided to issue an order for two experimental aircraft with a view to evaluating their ability towards fulfilling the standing interceptor requirement.

Accordingly, a pair of prototype aircraft, known as the VJ 101 C, were developed; these were powered by the lighter RB145 turbojet engine, which was mounted in swivelling nacelles instead. However, development of the VJ 101 C would not be straightforward; one major complication was the changing requirements of the BMVg, who decided to switch the aircraft's envisioned mission profile from the interceptor role to a more general fighter instead, which imposed a requirement for it to be capable of longer low altitude flight endurance, amongst other performance attributes. The new proposal had merged the characteristics of earlier Bölkow, Heinkel and Messerschmitt designs into a sleek, streamlined platform. The VJ 101 C bore some similarities in appearance to the American Bell XF-109, both aircraft having a comparable configuration in terms of possessing paired engines fitted within swivelling nacelles which were positioned at their wingtips. In addition to the wingtip engines, two further lift jets were installed within the fuselage, which functioned to supplement the main engines during hovering flight.

The VJ 101 C featured an electronic flight control system, widely known as a 'fly-by-wire' arrangement. It was realised that it would be of critical importance to maintain controllability during the hover phase of flight, in particular the responsiveness of the engines and augmentation of the aircraft's stability. Control systems, developed by American firm Honeywell and Germany company Bodenseewerk, performed various functions across the flight regime of the VJ 101 C, including attitude control during hover and the transition from hover to horizontal aerodynamic flight. Two-channel control systems were initially used, but testing revealed the need for three-channel control systems to account for instances of hardover failures. Upon the switch to three-channel control systems, this enabled the system to be used through all flight ranges with thrust-vector control; the first such system to be developed. After the programme was no longer being pursued as a successor to the F104G Starfighter, it was retained as a development programme to explore and prove its flight control concepts.

In order to test the propulsion concept, EWR produced a test rig, called the Wippe (seesaw), during early 1960. The simple device incorporated a rudimentary cockpit fixed upon a horizontal beam, which had a "lift" engine mounted vertically at the centre, for the purpose of performing preliminary single-axis tests of the control system. A later "hover rig" was assembled, which had the skeletal fuselage of the VJ 101C along with a total of three Rolls-Royce RB108 engines installed in the approximate positions that they would occupy in the final flight-capable version. The small engines each could generate a maximum of 9.3 kN (2,100 lb_{f}) thrust, enough to lift the test rig. Starting in May 1961, initial testing was conducted from a telescopic column, in March 1962, the new rig conducted its first "free flight" successfully. Additional tests performed with a cloth "skin" to simulate the fuselage and wings proved to be successful as well, having demonstrated satisfactory control throughout all seasons and weather conditions.

=== Testing and evaluation ===
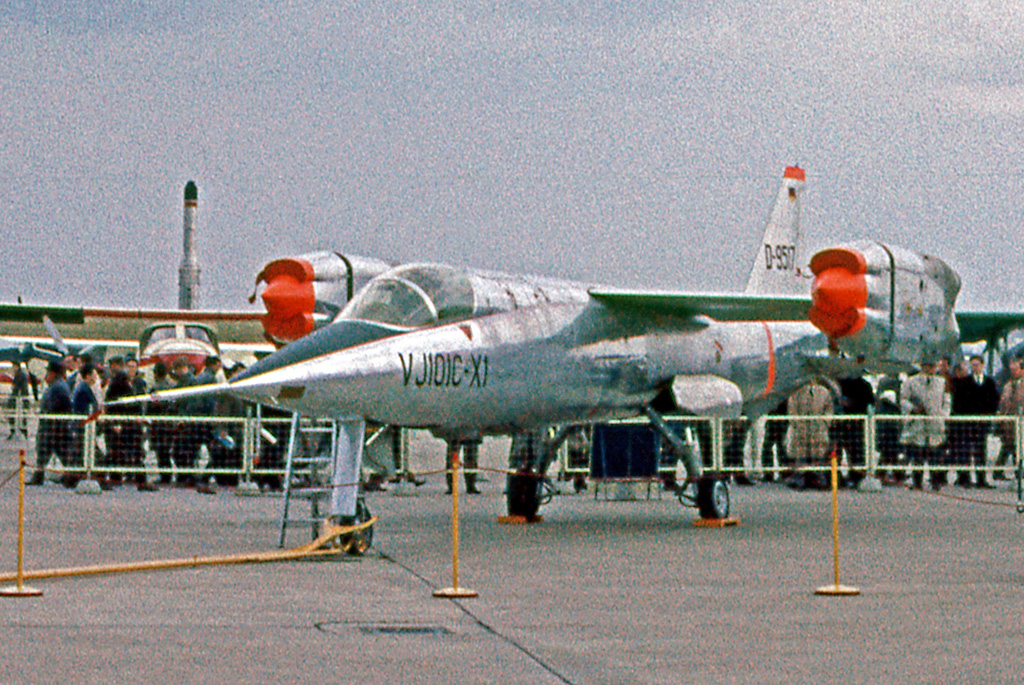
The X-1 Prototype exhibited at the 1964 Hanover Air Show

A pair of prototypes were completed, known as the X-1 and the X-2. The X-1 was to be outfitted with an arrangement of six RB145 engines: two being mounted vertically in the fuselage for lift and four within the swivelling nacelles, each of which being able to generate 2,750 lbf of thrust. The X-2 was to have the swivelling engines equipped with an afterburner, which would enable them to produce a wet thrust of 3,840 lbf each. In turn, this was projected to enable the aircraft to attain its design speed of Mach 1.8.

Although the nacelle engines were capable of producing adequate thrust as to allow the aircraft to steadily hover on dry thrust alone, concerns over the smoothness of transition from dry thrust to reheat led to a requirement being approved for the aircraft to have the ability of taking off vertically under reheat. Accordingly, this required a very short reheat pipe to be adopted in order to provide the necessary ground clearance. The reheated engines featured a relatively simple two-position nozzle, which could switch between reheat and non-reheat; the inlet duct was also capable of being moved forward when the aircraft was moving at slow speeds or during a hover, which opened an auxiliary air intake.

On 10 April 1963, the X-1 made its first hovering flight. On 20 September 1963, the first transition from hovering flight to horizontal flight took place. The X-1 was first publicly exhibited at the May 1964 Hannover Air Show. The VJ 101C X-1 flew a total of 40 aerodynamic flights, 24 hover flights and 14 full transitions. In the course of these tests, the sound barrier was broken for the first time by a vertical takeoff aircraft; however, on 14 September 1964, a defect in the autopilot caused the X-1 to crash, sustaining some damage as a result. On 29 July 1964, the VJ 101 C flew at Mach 1.04 without use of an afterburner.

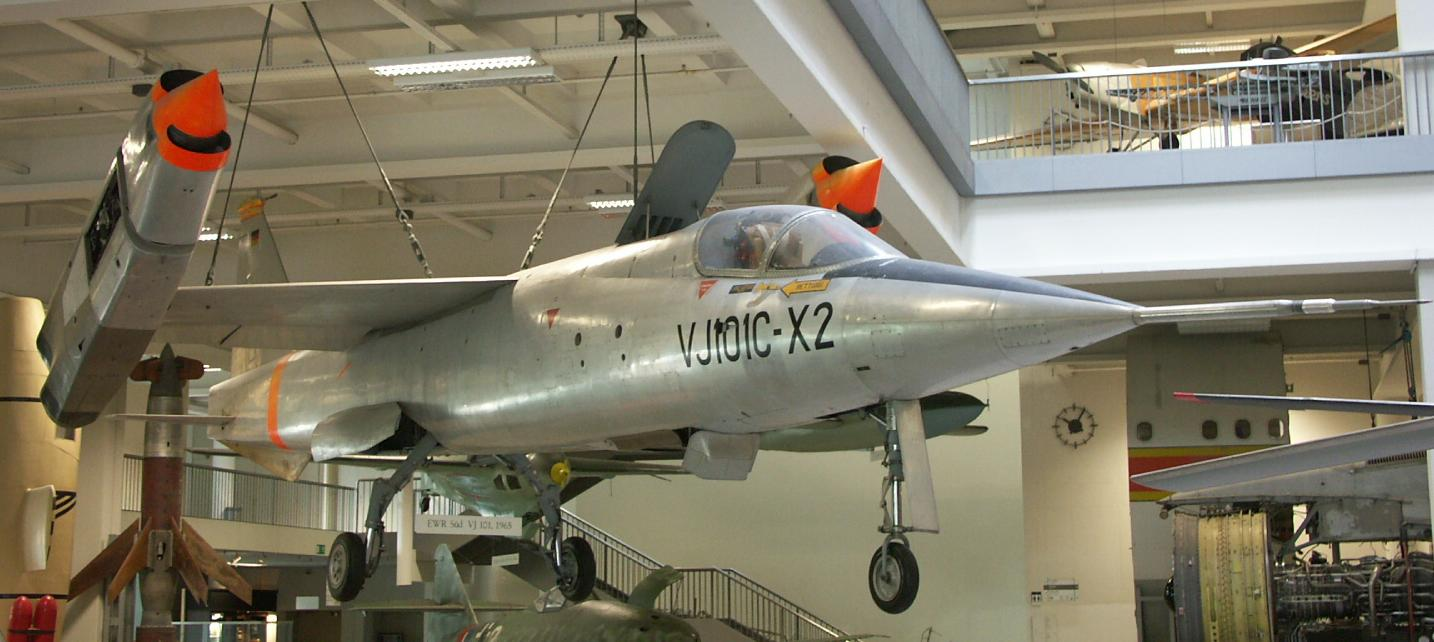
The X-2 prototype, displayed in the Deutsches Museum, 2006

On 12 June 1965, the second prototype, X-2, conducted its first flight. On 22 October 1965, the X-2 performed a successful transition with a new autopilot system installed. The tests were subsequently continued with X-2, which in contrast to X-1 was fitted with afterburners. However, the project was cancelled in 1968. The proposed VJ 101 D Mach 2 interceptor was never completed. Today, VJ 101 C X-2 is on public display at the Flugwerft Schleissheim. While the VJ 101C did not proceed to production status, various other projects of the era to develop supersonic-capable VTOL fighter aircraft, including the Mirage IIIV and the Hawker Siddeley P.1154 (a supersonic parallel to what would become the Hawker Siddeley Harrier, a subsonic VTOL combat aircraft that reached operational service), ultimately met similar fates. The Harrier jump jet and, substantially later, the Lockheed Martin F-35 Lightning II, has since demonstrated the potential of VTOL fighters.

== Specifications (VJ 101C X-1) ==
Data from Jane's All the World's Aircraft 1966-67, Macdonald Aircraft Handbook

General characteristics

- Crew: 1
- Length: 15.7 m (51 ft 6 in)
- Wingspan: 6.61 m (21 ft 8 in)
- Height: 4.1 m (13 ft 5 in)
- Max takeoff weight: 6,000 kg (13,228 lb) for VTOL

(X-2; 8,000 kg (17,637 lb) MTOW for VTOL with reheated wingtip engines)

- Powerplant: 6 × Rolls-Royce/MAN Turbo RB.145 turbojet engines, 12.2 kN (2,750 lbf) thrust each

(X-2; 4x reheated RB.145 in wing-tip pods + 2x un-reheated lift-jets in fuselage)

Performance

- Maximum speed: Mach 1.08 (achieved)
- Minimum flying speed clean: 260 km/h (162 mph; 140 kn)

== See also ==
- Dornier Do 31
- Hawker Siddeley P.1154
- VFW VAK 191B

Aircraft of comparable role, configuration, and era

- Bell XF-109
