= Rolls-Royce RB.162 =

1960s British turbojet aircraft engine

RB.162
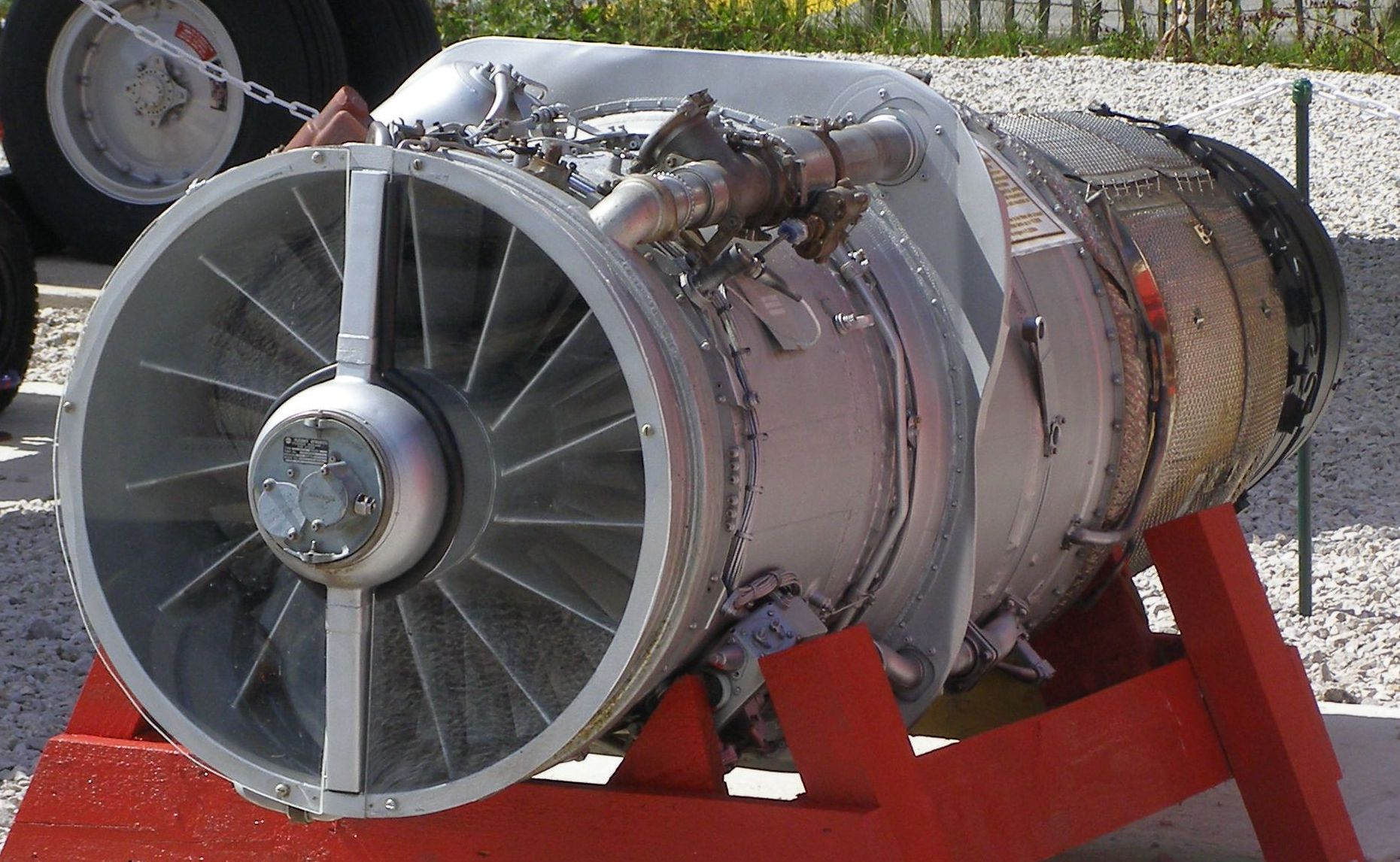
- Type: Turbojet
- Manufacturer: Rolls-Royce Limited
- First run: January 1962
- Major applications: Hawker Siddeley Trident; Dornier Do 31
- Number built: 86

The Rolls-Royce RB.162 is a lightweight British turbojet engine produced by Rolls-Royce Limited. Developed in the early 1960s, it was specially designed for use as a lift engine for VTOL aircraft but was also used in a later variant of the Hawker Siddeley Trident airliner as an auxiliary boost engine. A smaller related variant, the RB.181 remained a design project only, as did a turbofan version designated RB.175.

== Design and development ==
The RB.162 was designed to meet an anticipated need for a lift engine to power VTOL aircraft with the emphasis on simplicity, durability and lightweight construction. Development costs were shared by Britain, France and Germany after signing a joint memorandum of agreement. The engine was the worlds first turbojet to use composite fibre glass compressor casings and plastic compressor blades to save weight which also had the effect of reducing production costs. The engine has no oil system, a metered dose of oil instead being injected into the two main bearings by the compressed air used to turn the compressor at startup. Although the RB.162 was a successful design, the expected large VTOL aircraft market did not materialise and the engine was only produced in limited numbers. The French government invested in losses 79 million French francs (1970 value, or 94 million euros in 2022 values) between 1960 and 1966 for the Mirage IIIV.

=== Development for the Trident ===
In 1966 British European Airways (BEA) had a requirement for an extended range aircraft to serve Mediterranean destinations. After a plan to operate a mixed fleet of Boeing 727 and 737 aircraft was not approved by the British Government Hawker Siddeley offered BEA a stretched and improved performance version of the Trident that they were already operating. This variant, the Trident 3B, used, in addition to its three Rolls-Royce Spey turbofan engines, a centrally mounted RB.162-86 which was used for take-off and climb in the hot prevailing conditions of the Mediterranean area. The 'boost' engine was shut down for cruising flight. Some conversion was needed for the change from vertical to horizontal installation. With the RB.162 fitted the Trident 3B had a 15% increase in thrust over the earlier variants for an engine weight penalty of only 5%.

=== RB175 and 181 ===
A design study for a turbofan version of the RB.162 was designated RB175. Another projected derivative, the RB.181 was to be a scaled-down version of the RB.162 producing approximately 2,000 lbs of thrust. Seven of these lift engines were to power the unbuilt Lockheed/Short Brothers CL-704 VTOL variant of the F-104 Starfighter.

== Applications ==
- Dassault Mirage IIIV
- Dornier Do 31
- Hawker Siddeley Trident 3B
- VFW VAK 191B

== Engines on display ==
- A preserved Rolls-Royce RB.162 is on public display at the Royal Air Force Museum Cosford.
- An RB.162-4D is on display at the Deutsches Museum, Munich.
- An RB.162 is on display in the Department Of Engineering at the University of Liverpool.
- A part-sectioned RB.162 is on display at the Rolls-Royce Heritage Trust Collection, (Derby).
- An RB162-86 (from Trident 3) is on display at the East Midlands Aeropark, adjacent to the East Midlands Airport.

== Specifications (RB.162-86) ==
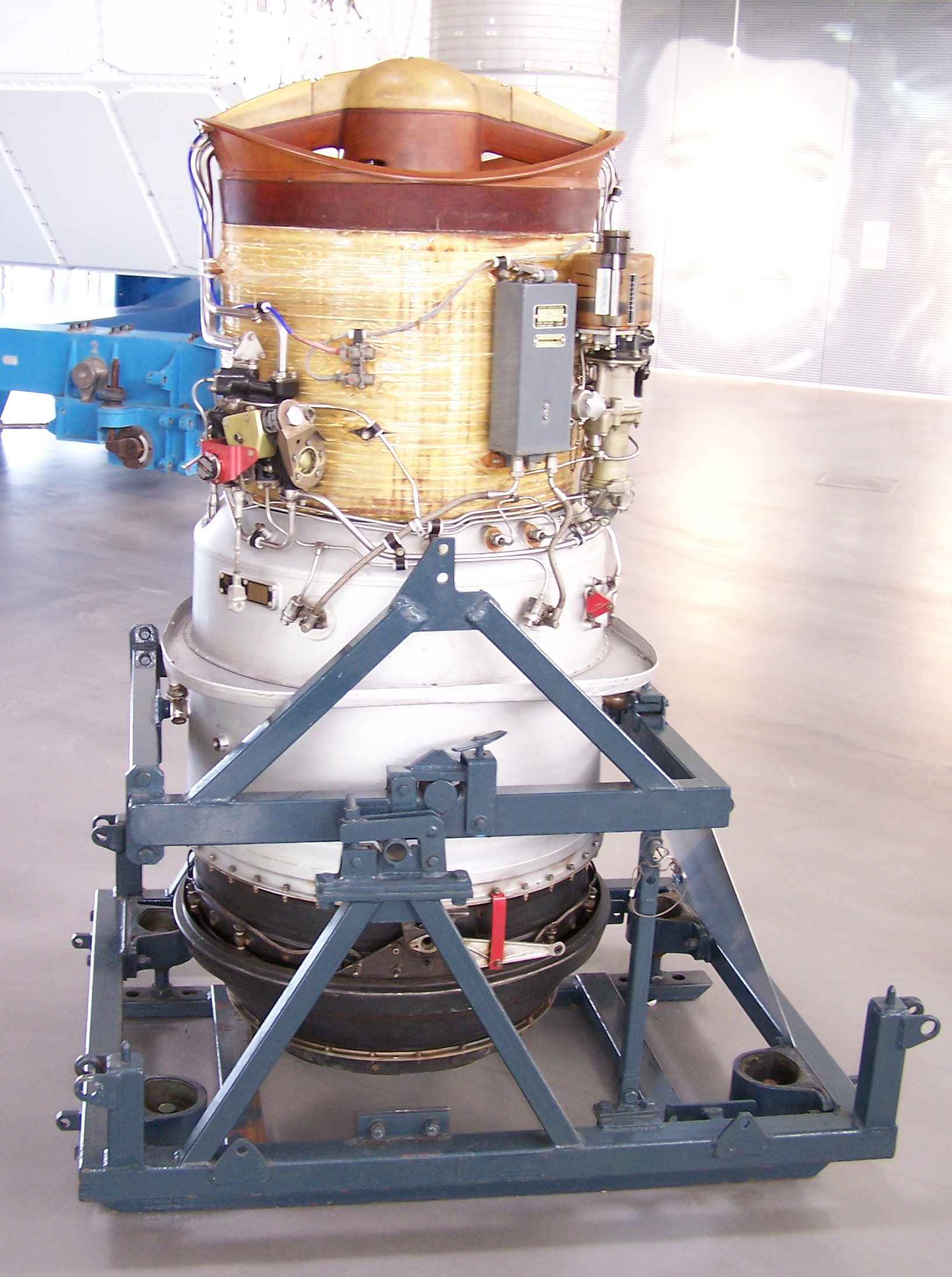
Rolls-Royce RB.162-4D on display at the Dornier Museum Friedrichshafen

Data from

==== General characteristics ====
- Type: Single spool turbojet
- Length: 51.6 in (1311 mm)
- Diameter: 25.0 in (635 mm)
- Dry weight: 280 lbs (127 kg)

==== Components ====
- Compressor: 6-stage axial flow
- Combustors: Annular
- Turbine: Single-stage axial flow

==== Performance ====
- Maximum thrust: 5,250 lb (23 kN)
- Air mass flow: 86 lb/sec (39 kg/s)
- Thrust-to-weight ratio: 18.75

== See also ==
- Thrust Measuring Rig

Comparable engines

- Armstrong Siddeley Viper
- Bristol Siddeley Orpheus
- Rolls-Royce RB108

Related lists

- List of aircraft engines
