= Armstrong Whitworth AW.171 =

1950s British experimental aircraft

AW.171

General information
- Type: Experimental aircraft
- Manufacturer: Armstrong Whitworth
- Status: Cancelled
- Number built: 0

The Armstrong Whitworth AW.171 was a British project of the 1950s to develop a supersonic VTOL flying wing aircraft. It was planned to investigate the extremely low aspect ratio delta wings proposed by Professor A.A. Griffith for supersonic transports. The A.W.171 design was a very slender delta flying wing powered by two Bristol Orpheus turbojets mounted at the wingtips, with 10 Rolls-Royce RB.108 lift jets. The pilot was to lie in a prone position to minimise drag. Work was cancelled in 1957 before a prototype was completed.

== Specification ==
Data from Paper Planes:Armstrong Whitworth's unbuilt projects

General characteristics

- Crew: 1
- Length: 70 ft 10 in (21.59 m)
- Wingspan: 17 ft 7 in (5.36 m)
- Gross weight: 17,500 lb (7,938 kg)
- Powerplant: 2 × Bristol Orpheus turbojet, 4,850 lbf (21.6 kN) thrust each
- Powerplant: 10 × Rolls-Royce RB108 turbojet (lift jets), 2,100 lbf (9.3 kN) thrust each

Performance

- Maximum speed: Mach 2.0

== See also ==
Aircraft of comparable role, configuration, and era

- Bristol 188
