= Rolls-Royce Thrust Measuring Rig =

1950s British experimental VTOL aircraft

Thrust Measuring Rig
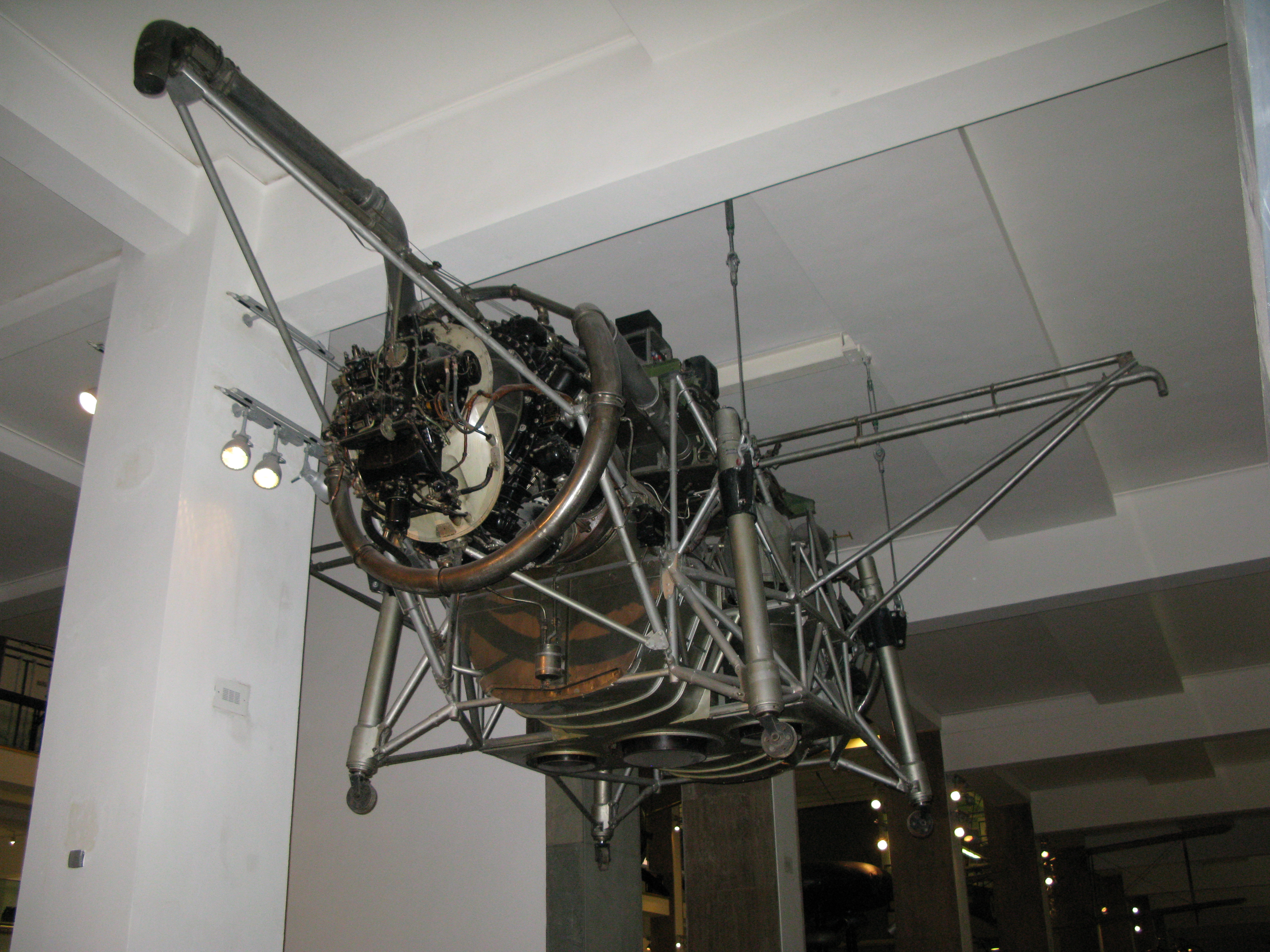
- On display in the Science Museum, London

General information
- Type: Experimental vertical take-off
- National origin: United Kingdom
- Manufacturer: Rolls-Royce
- Number built: 2

History
- First flight: 3 August 1954 (free)

The Rolls-Royce Thrust Measuring Rig (TMR) was a pioneering vertical take-off and landing (VTOL) aircraft developed by Rolls-Royce in the 1950s. It has the distinction of being "the first jet-lift aircraft to fly anywhere in the world".

The design of the TMR is unique. It was powered by a pair of Nene turbojet engines, which were mounted back-to-back horizontally within a steel framework; in turn, this framework was raised upon four legs fitted with castors for wheels. The TMR lacked any lifting surfaces, such as wings; instead, lift was generated purely by the thrust being directed downwards. Due to its unconventional appearance, it was nicknamed the Flying Bedstead.

The TMR had been envisioned specifically for conducting research, specifically to explore the potential applications of then-newly developed jet propulsion towards carrying out vertical flights. First flying in August 1954, extensive studies were conducted during a series of test flights into how stabilisation could be performed during the aircraft's hover. It contributed to a greater understanding of the level of power and appropriate manners of stabilisation involved in a VTOL aircraft, as well as proving the feasibility of the concept in general.

== Development ==
The man largely responsible for the development of the TMR was Dr Alan Arnold Griffith, who had worked on gas turbine design at the Royal Aircraft Establishment (RAE), in the 1920s and was a pioneer of jet lift technology. In 1939, Griffith had been employed by Rolls-Royce. During the 1940s, he conceived of using jet propulsion as a method of directly providing vertical lift to produce an aircraft that could take off vertically. The construction of such an aircraft for research purposes was suggested by Griffith.

Being suitably impressed by Griffith's concept, while also being keen to explore and harness the capabilities of its newly developed range of jet engines, Rolls-Royce commenced construction of the aircraft at the company's facility at Hucknall Aerodrome, Nottinghamshire, England. The crucial auto-stabiliser for the aircraft was designed and produced by the Instrument and Air Photography Department of the Royal Aircraft Establishment (RAE). The aircraft was designated as the Thrust Measuring Rig (TMR), two were constructed for the test program.

On 19 August 1953, the first TMR Serial XJ314 conducted its maiden flight at Hucknall Aerodrome. In order to perform these flights, a purpose-built gantry-like arrangement had been devised and assembled at Hucknall which, while not restricting the aircraft's movement within a defined space, prevented it from exceeding that boundary; it also prevented excessive descent rates, allowing for a maximum descent rate of 10 feet per second (3 m/s), from occurring in order to avoid sustaining damage and allowed struggling pilots to readily close the throttles without a resulting accident. During the first year of flights, the aircraft remained tethered within the gantry system for flight testing. On 3 August 1954, the TMR conducted its first free flight, piloted by Ronald Thomas Shepherd, Rolls-Royce's chief test pilot.

In late 1954, the TMR was transferred to the RAE's research facilities, firstly being assigned to RAE Farnborough. In June 1956, it was relocated to RAE Bedford, Bedfordshire, for the purposes of conducting further flight tests. While the practicalities surrounding controllability had been addressed during its time at Hucknall, the RAE were more interested in using the TMR to determine if artificial stabilisation would be necessary for such aircraft, both during the hover and the low-speed stages of flight, and to investigate desirable characteristics towards achieving stable vertical flight.

Information from typical flights was primarily acquired through the reported experiences of the pilots. During stability trials, more quantifiable data was gained by instructing multiple pilots to follow the same sequence of manoeuvres, many of which were intended to be representative of VTOL aircraft transitioning into hovering flight; multiple observers were also employed as well. Test flights had several safety restrictions placed upon them: the TMR was not typically flown if the wind speed was 10 knots or greater, it would only fly under weather conditions in which the aircraft could be controlled in the event of a fault. Pilots were able to perform take-offs and controlled landings, but found both feats to be more difficult if wind was present, particularly if the TMR was required to tilt in order to counteract the wind's effects.

Reportedly, pilots found that the main initial difficulty in flying the TMR was the regulation of the aircraft's height; this was partially due to the slow response of the engine to throttle movements being commanded by the pilot. The delay interval between the throttle and the engine response was often around the one-to-two second mark; pilots would typically adapt to this peculiarity of the aircraft and become adept at mastering height control. Two attempts were made to improve the height control, the addition of a simplistic trimmer on the throttle to restrict its possible speed of movement, and the installation of 'throttle-anticipators' that failed to operate as intended. The TMR effectively demonstrated that delay in the height control response would be a major difficulty of VTOL aircraft, and the engines of later VTOL aircraft did typically feature faster response times.

The aircraft survived a failure of its thrust-vectored control system on 16 September 1957 whilst being piloted by Wing Commander Stan Hubbard of the RAE. On 28 November 1957, the second TMR, Serial XK426, was destroyed during a test flight, resulting in the death of Wing Commander H. G. F. Larsen, who had been piloting the aircraft for the first time.

The research from the TMR's test programme were of considerable value to future VTOL aircraft, as least in some areas: an official report published by the Ministry of Aviation summarised that "the main conclusion to be drawn from this experience is that any practical jet-lift aircraft must have some artificial stabilisation while hovering if it is to operate in other than very favourable weather conditions...the main difficulty in learning to fly the aircraft was the height control; any reduction in the time constant of the engine response would make the problem of learning to fly a jet-lift aircraft easier". Following the relatively successful trials of the TMR, Rolls-Royce decided to proceed with the development of the Rolls-Royce RB108 direct-lift turbojet; five of these engines were used to power the first true British VTOL aircraft, the Short SC.1.

== Design ==
The Rolls-Royce Thrust Measuring Rig (TMR) was a VTOL aircraft developed to explore the practicality, characteristics, and requirements of such an aircraft. It was widely known by its nickname of the Flying Bedstead due to its radically unconventional appearance for an aircraft, basically consisting of a rectangular tubular framework that was built around the engines, a platform being placed on top of which to accommodate a single pilot. It did not have any aerodynamic shape, lacking either wings or a tail; it instead generated all of its lift by directing the thrust of its engines directly downwards. Due its small size, the TMR had a maximum flight endurance of only six minutes.

It was powered by a pair of Nene turbojet engines, which were installed in a back-to-back configuration. The output of the jets was directed towards the centre of gravity of the rig; one jetpipe discharging downwards through a central nozzle while the other jet discharged downwards through two smaller nozzles on either side; this was so that, in the event of a single engine failing during flight, there would not be any sharp adverse movement as a result. Considerable precautions were taken to safely sustain such an engine failure; the four-leg undercarriage was designed to support a vertical velocity of 34 feet per second (10 m/s), and to withstand a single-engine landing from any height below 50 feet (15 m). The TMR possessed only marginal excess power, which complicated the act of flying the aircraft; this was further compounded by the slow response time of the engines to throttle changes. Accordingly, there was a considerable degree of anticipation in the use of engine power required to prevent overshooting of desired altitude, and to ensure a gentle touchdown when landing.

A total of four outrigger arms extended out from the rig, one on either side and one each at the front and rear, through which compressed air was released for control in roll, pitch and yaw when in flight. While the controls for yaw and height were mechanically based, the pitch and roll controls were electrically signalled, without any provision for reverting to mechanical operation. Initially, key components for the electrical control system components were duplicated; however, in order to make the detection of faults infallible, a safer partial-triplex arrangement was adopted for the RAE's free flight testing phase. As the TMR possessed no inherent stability, it incorporated an experimental automatic stabiliser system. During its numerous test flights, varying degrees of intervention by the stabiliser were performed, including a few in which no stabilisation was active at all.

== Aircraft on display ==
The first machine (Serial XJ314) is preserved and on public display at the Science Museum in London, England.

== Specifications (Thrust Measuring Rig) ==
General characteristics

- Length: 28 ft 0 in (8.53 m)
- Width: 14 ft 0 in (4.27 m)
- Height: 12 ft 8 in (3.86 m) excluding pylon
- Empty weight: 6,000 lb (2,722 kg)
- Gross weight: 7,500 lb (3,402 kg)
- Powerplant: 2 × Rolls-Royce Nene centrifugal-flow turbojet engines, 4,050 lbf (18.0 kN) thrust each

Performance

- Thrust/weight: 1.08

Avionics

- Automatic stabilisation

== See also ==
Comparable aircraft

- Aérospatiale Ludion
- SNECMA Atar Volant
- Lunar Landing Research Vehicle
- VFW SG 1262 Schwebegestell
