= Rolls-Royce RB.108 =

1950s British turbojet aircraft engine

RB.108
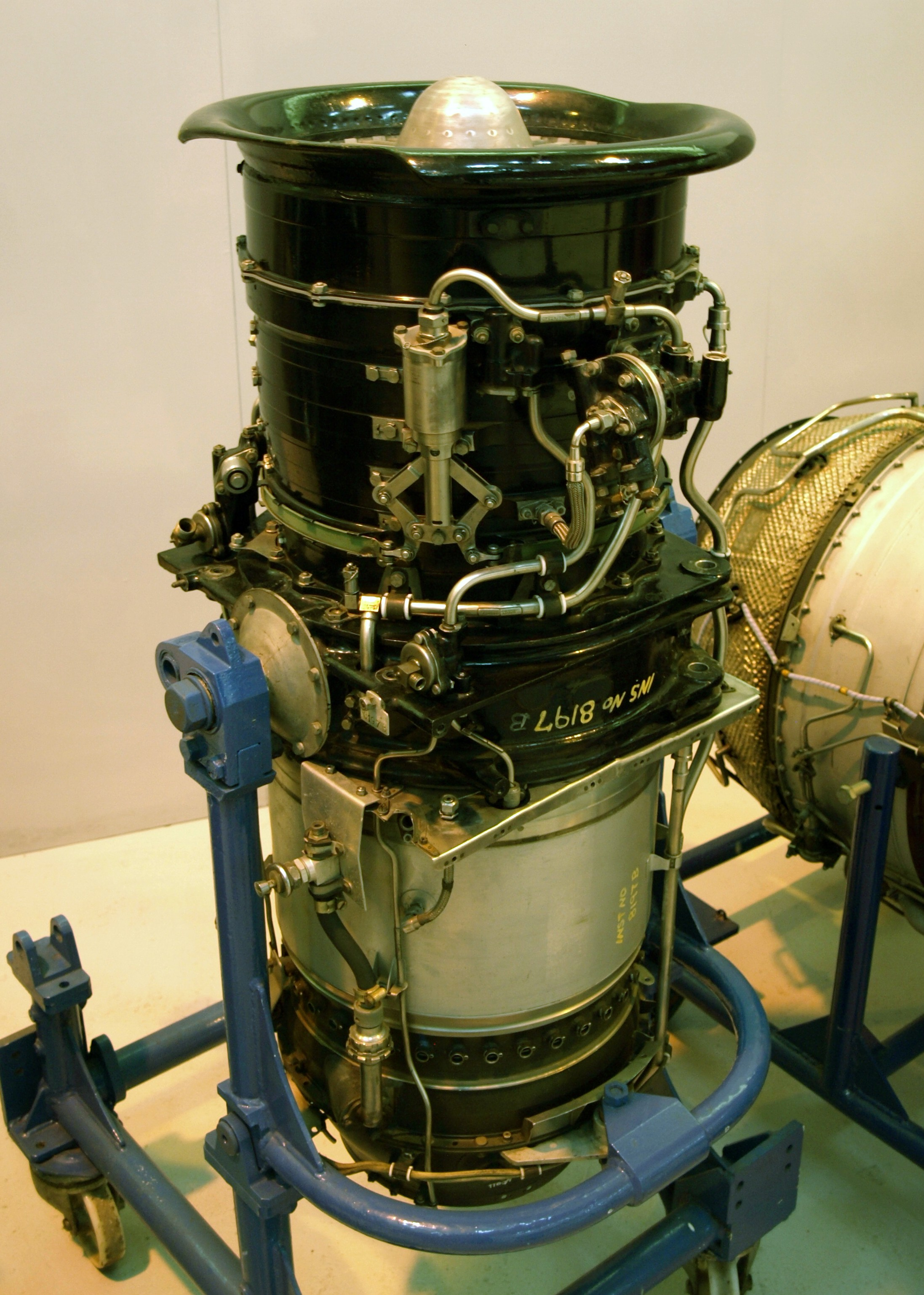
- Preserved RB.108 at the Royal Air Force Museum Cosford
- Type: Turbojet
- Manufacturer: Rolls-Royce Limited
- First run: 1955
- Major applications: Short SC.1
- Developed into: Rolls-Royce RB145 lift/cruise engine

The Rolls-Royce RB.108 was a British jet engine designed in the mid-1950s by Rolls-Royce specifically for use as a VTOL lift engine. It was also used to provide horizontal thrust in the Short SC.1.

== Design and development ==
The RB.108 was the first direct-lift turbojet produced by Rolls-Royce. It originated from a VTOL concept in which Alan A. Griffith proposed using a small number of specialised lift engines in a VTOL aircraft, separate from the engines which provided forward propulsion. Its power output (thrust) was not high enough for use as a practical engine in a production aircraft and was used only for research into VTOL. It was constructed from conventional materials. (The next lift engine, the RB.162, would have a compressor built mainly from glass-fibre composite and have a higher T/W ratio.) The RB.108 bearings and oil system were designed to operate with an engine attitude envelope which covered engine and aircraft tilting while transitioning between hovering and forward flight. When a fifth engine was installed in the SC.1 to provide forward thrust it had to be mounted at about 45 degrees to remain within the envelope. The exhaust was directed horizontally with a curved jetpipe.

== Operational history ==
The RB.108 was used in the Short SC.1, which used four for lift with an additional one mounted at an angle at the rear for propulsion, and the Dassault Balzac V, which used eight vertically mounted RB.108s for lift. The Vereinigte Flugtechnische Werke (VFW) SG 1262 used five RB.108s, three mounted in tandem on the centreline, with one RB.108 either side.

The RB.108 was also the intended powerplant for several other VTOL aircraft designs, including one by Dornier.

A similar lift jet was designed by Bristol Siddeley, the BS.59, with a thrust of 8,000 lb the engine was intended for the projected Focke-Wulf Fw 260.

== Applications ==
- Armstrong Whitworth AW.171
- Dassault Balzac V
- Short SC.1
- VFW SG 1262 Schwebegestell

== Specifications (RB.108) ==
Data from Aircraft engines of the World 1964/65.

==== General characteristics ====
- Type: Single-spool turbojet
- Length: 48.3 in (123 cm)
- Diameter: 20.8 in (53 cm)
- Dry weight: 267 lb (121 kg)

==== Components ====
- Compressor: 8-stage axial flow
- Combustors: Annular
- Turbine: 2-stage axial flow
- Fuel type: JP-1
- Oil system: Non-return, total loss with metering pumps at 20 psi (140 kPa)

==== Performance ====
- Maximum thrust:

No bleed air: 2,500 lbf (11 kN) at 17,500 rpm
11% Bleed air: 2,210 lbf (9.8 kN) at 17,500 rpm (4.3 lb/s (2.0 kg/s) bleed)

- Overall pressure ratio: 5.33:1
- Air mass flow: 38.8 lb/s (17.6 kg/s)
- Turbine inlet temperature: 1,346 °F (730 °C; 1,003 K) (Turbine Inlet Temperature (TIT))
- Specific fuel consumption: 1.06 lb/lbf/h (108 kg/kN/h)
- Oil Consumption: 0.4 lb/lbf/h (41 kg/kN/h)
- Thrust-to-weight ratio: 9.3

== See also ==
- Thrust Measuring Rig

Related development

- Rolls-Royce RB145
- Rolls-Royce RB162

Related lists

- List of aircraft engines
