= Lift jet =

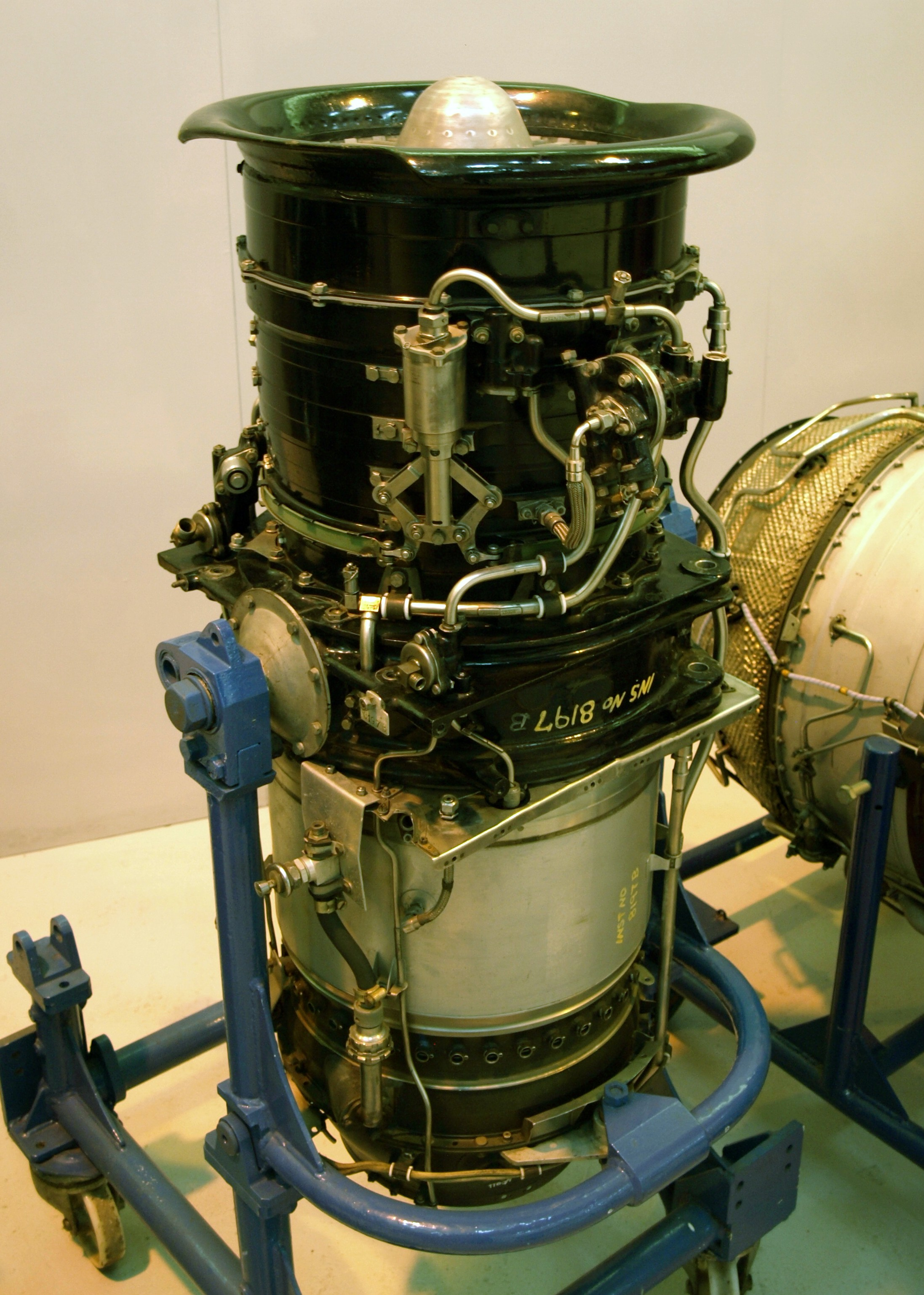
A lift jet - the Rolls-Royce RB.108

A lift jet is a typically lightweight jet engine designed specifically to provide upward thrust.

An early experimental program using lift engines was the Rolls-Royce Thrust Measuring Rig (TMR), nicknamed the "Flying Bedstead", first run in 1955.

In the early 1960s both the Soviet Union and Western nations considered lift engines to provide STOL or even VTOL capability to combat aircraft. The Soviet Union did concurrent testing of versions of combat aircraft using variable geometry wings or lift jets but ruled out lift jets. Problems associated with lift engines include high fuel consumption, extra weight (which is simply dead weight when the engines are not needed for lift), and taking up fuselage volume that could be used for fuel or other systems. It was decided that variable-geometry wings provided comparable advantages in take-off performance without as many penalties and the Mikoyan MiG-23 and Sukhoi Su-24 entered service.

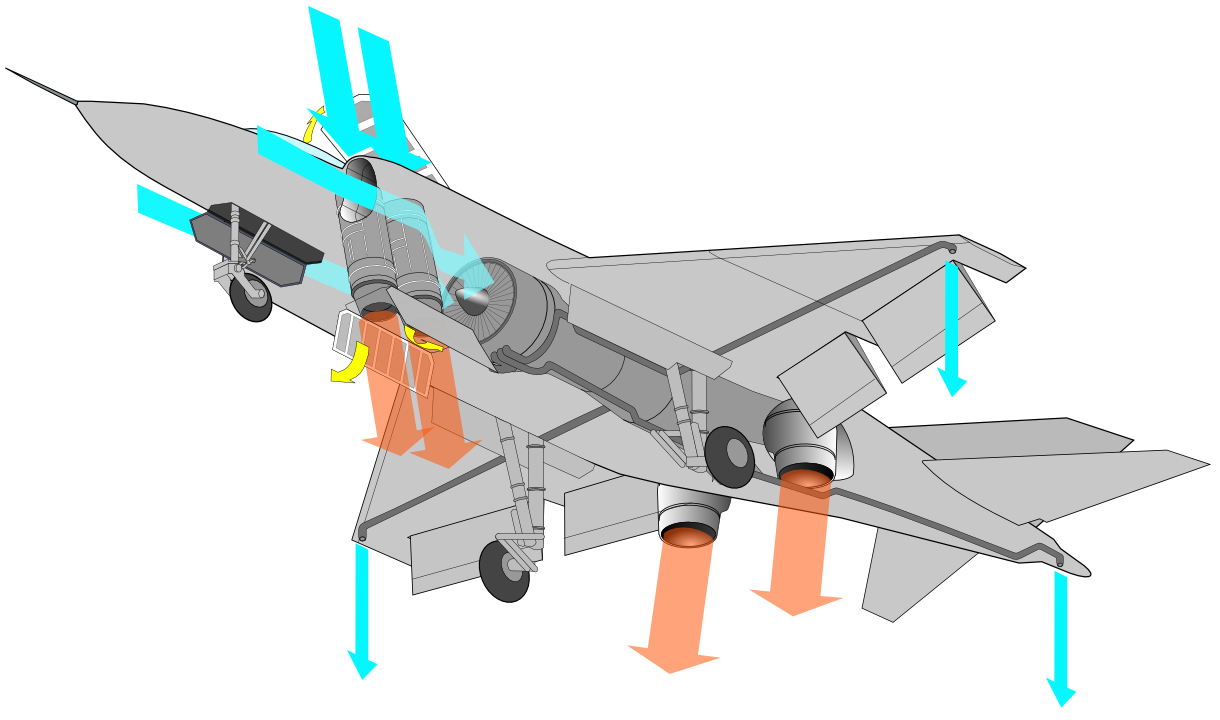
Yak-38 Forger with 2 lift engines behind the cockpit

An operational military aircraft which used lift engines was the Soviet Yakovlev Yak-38, a VTOL fighter used by the AVMF's small aircraft carriers, which were not large enough to support conventional fixed-wing aircraft.

An alternative to the lift jet for vertical thrust is the lift fan used on the STOVL Lockheed F-35B version of the U.S. Joint Strike Fighter.

== See also ==
- Lift fan
- VTOL
