= Akaflieg Stuttgart fs29 =

German single-seat glider, 1975

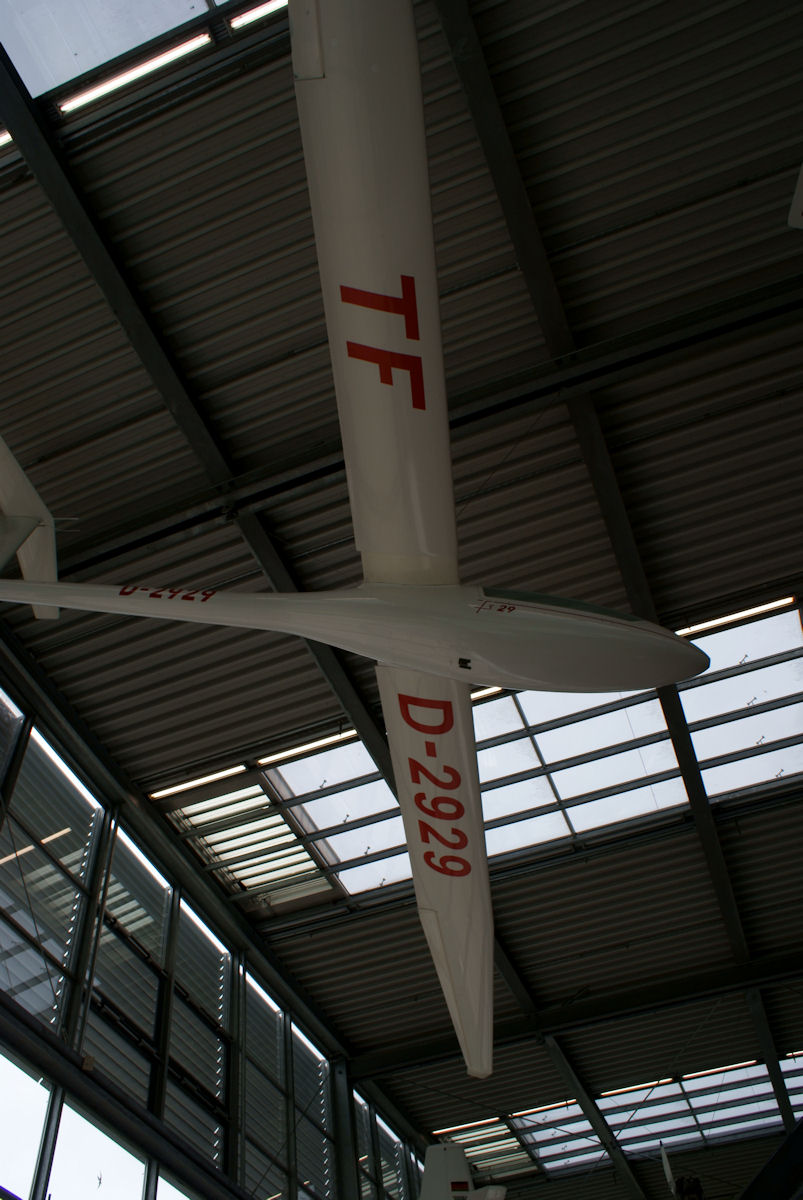
- The fs29 on display at the Deutsches Museum Flugwerft Schleißheim

General information
- Type: Glider
- National origin: West Germany
- Manufacturer: Akaflieg Stuttgart
- Number built: 1

History
- First flight: 15th of June 1975

The Akaflieg Stuttgart fs29 TF Stadt Stuttgart is a glider designed and built in Germany from 1972.

== Development ==
The fs29 was designed and built to research the telescopic variable span wing. With the wing at full extension the fs29 could thermal successfully in very weak conditions and land safely in small spaces, conversely with the wing fully retracted the fs29 could cruise between lift at higher speeds, improving performance in distance/speed competitions, as well as perform aerobatics to higher load factors with faster control response.

Construction of the fs29 was as follows:-

- Inner wing:
  - Spar: Carbon Fibre Epoxy.
  - Skin: Glassfibre Re-inforced Epoxy + Foam Sandwich.
- Outer wing:
  - Rectangular section: Carbon Fibre Epoxy Skin.
  - Trapezoidal Section: Glassfibre Re-inforced Epoxy + Foam Sandwich.
- Fuselage Structure: Welded steel tubing.
- Cockpit: Glassfibre Re-inforced Epoxy + Foam Sandwich .
- Tail Boom Skin: Aluminum Alloy.
- Tail Unit: Glassfibre Re-inforced Epoxy + Foam Sandwich (derived from the tail of the Schempp-Hirth Nimbus-2).

Extension and retraction of the outer wings was made by a screw jacks and nuts operated by the pilot pumping a handle via two-way free-wheel mechanisms, toothed belts and torque shafts which pulled or pushed the outer wings over the inner wings as required. The gap between the inside of the outer wing and the skin of the inner wing could be as much as 3mm without causing excess drag or affecting the flying qualities. The fs29 was demonstrated in flight at the 1996 ILA airshow at Berlin Schönefeld Airport, along with the Akaflieg Braunschweig SB-10 and SB-13. The sole fs29 was damaged in an accident during the summer of 1997, but is being re-built; meanwhile the fs29 can be seen at the Deutsches Museum in Munich.

== Specifications ==
Data from https://akaflieg-stuttgart.de/en/projects/fs29-telescope-wing/

General characteristics

- Crew: 1
- Length: 7.16 m (23 ft 6 in)
- Wingspan: 13.3–19 m (43 ft 8 in – 62 ft 4 in)
- Height: 0.78 m (2 ft 6.5 in)
- Wing area: 8.56–12.65 m^{2} (92.14–136.16 sq ft)
- Aspect ratio: 20.67 – 28.54
- Airfoil:
  Rectangular part: FX 73 -170
  Trapezoidal part: FX 73 - K - 170/22, β=0°
- Empty weight: 357 kg (787 lb)
- Gross weight: 450 kg (992 lb)

Performance

== See also ==
Related lists

- List of aircraft
- List of gliders
