= VFW VAK 191B =

Experimental strike fighter aircraft by VFW

VAK 191B
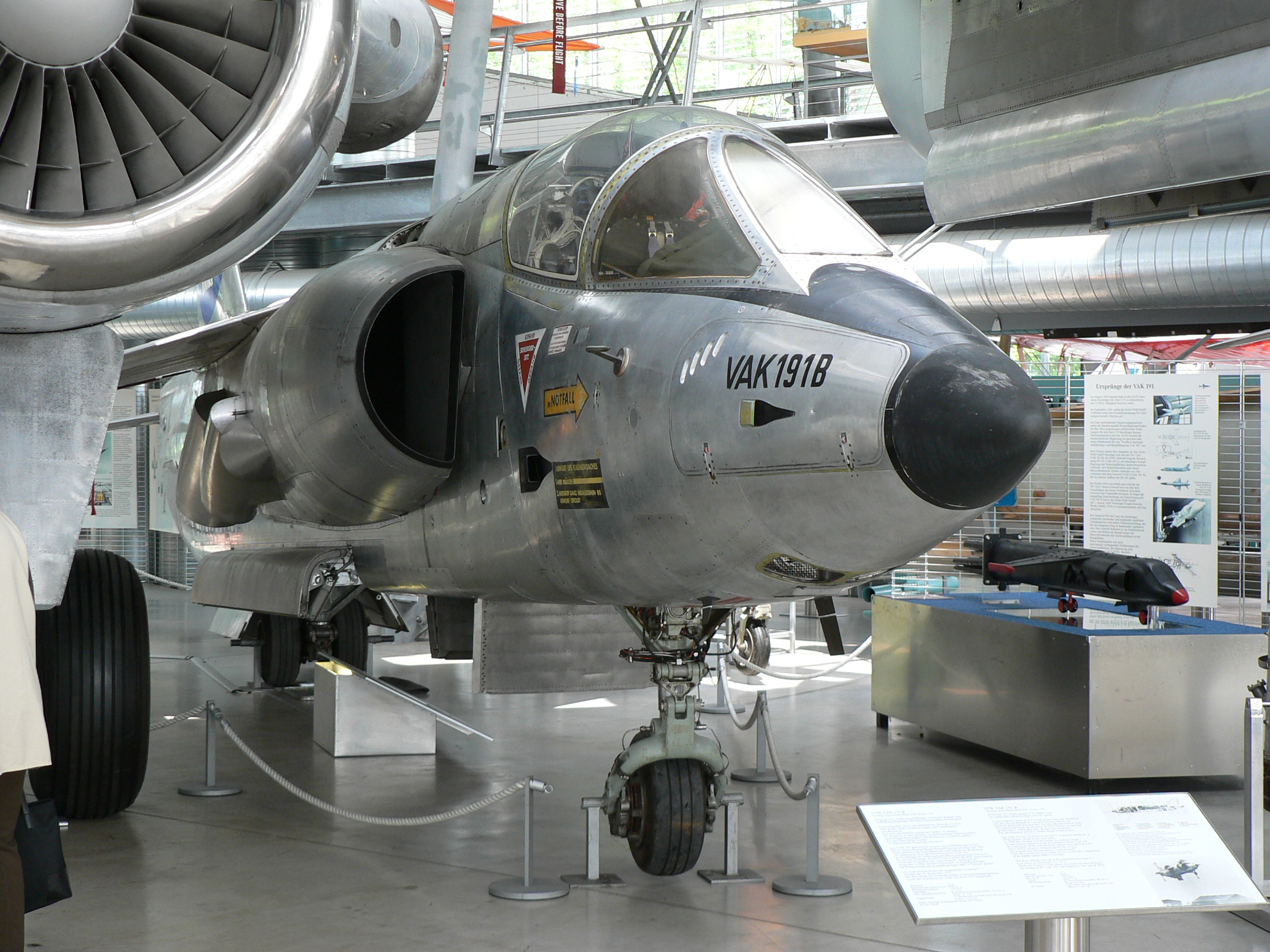
- VAK 191B displayed next to a Dornier Do 31 transport

General information
- Type: VTOL strike fighter
- Manufacturer: Vereinigte Flugtechnische Werke
- Status: Retired
- Number built: 3

History
- First flight: 10 September 1971

The VFW VAK 191B was an experimental German vertical take-off and landing (VTOL) strike fighter of the early 1970s. VAK was the abbreviation for Vertikalstartendes Aufklärungs- und Kampfflugzeug (Vertical Take-off Reconnaissance and Strike Aircraft). Designed and built by the Vereinigte Flugtechnische Werke (VFW), it was developed with the purpose of eventually serving as a replacement for the Italian Fiat G.91 then in service with the German Air Force. Operationally, it was intended to have been armed with nuclear weapons as a deterrent against aggression from the Soviet Union and, in the event of a major war breaking out, to survive the first wave of attacks by deploying to dispersed locations, rather than conventional airfields, and to retaliate against targets behind enemy lines.

The VAK 191B suffered from a protracted development cycle, spanning ten years between inception and flight, in part due to changing requirements, changing partnerships and the difficulties inherent in the development of VTOL-capable aircraft. Ultimately, during the late 1960s, VFW decided to demote the development programme from targeting the type's production and instead only to test-fly a limited number of prototypes, using the VAK 191B effectively as a technology demonstrator and experimental aircraft to support the company's other activities and future programmes. On 10 September 1971, the first prototype conducted the type's maiden flight. A total of 91 flights were performed prior to the retirement of all three prototypes in 1975. These aircraft have been preserved and two are now on public display in museums.

== Design and development ==
=== Background ===
During the 1950s, rapid advances in the field of jet propulsion, particularly in terms of increased thrust and compact engine units, had contributed to an increased belief in the technical viability of vertical takeoff/landing (VTOL) aircraft, particularly within Western Europe and the United States. During 1950s and 1960s, multiple programmes in Britain, France, and the United States were initiated; likewise, aviation companies inside West Germany were keen not to be left out of this emerging technology. Shortly after 1957, the year in which the post-Second World War ban upon West Germany operating and developing combat aircraft was lifted, German aviation firms Dornier Flugzeugwerke, Heinkel, and Messerschmitt, having also been allowed to resume their own activities that same year, received an official request from the German Federal Government that urged them to perform investigative work on the topic of VTOL aircraft and to produce concept designs.

As such, multiple companies commenced work on their own conceptual designs for VTOL-capable interceptor aircraft; in order for these designs to be operationally relevant and viable, it was recognised that it would be necessary for the flight performance to equal that of conventional interceptors of the era, such as the contemporary Lockheed F-104G Starfighter. Over time, two separate and distinct requirements emerged, one calling for a VTOL-capable successor to the F-104G interceptor while the other sought a VTOL successor to the Italian Fiat G.91 ground-attack fighter. According to aerospace publication Flight International, this call for a Fiat G.91 replacement, which came under a NATO requirement, known as NBMR-3, was a crucial trigger and greatly influenced the development programme that would lead to the VAK 191B.

In conjunction with these requirements being on offer, Germany's Federal Ministry of Defence (BMVg) championed for the merger of the competing companies; it deliberately withheld the issuing of a development contract in order to incentivise companies to undertake such activities. As such, during September 1961, a new German aircraft company, known as Vereinigte Flugtechnische Werke (VFW), was formed as joint venture between Focke-Wulf and Weser Flugzeugbau, to develop its own VTOL strike aircraft. Initially, Italian aircraft manufacturer Fiat was also a participating company in VFW, however, Italy later chose to withdraw from the joint development agreement with Germany during 1967. Despite this decision, Fiat remained as a major sub-contractor for the venture, being responsible for the production of various structural elements such as wings, tailplanes and some of the fuselage.

=== Concept and definition ===
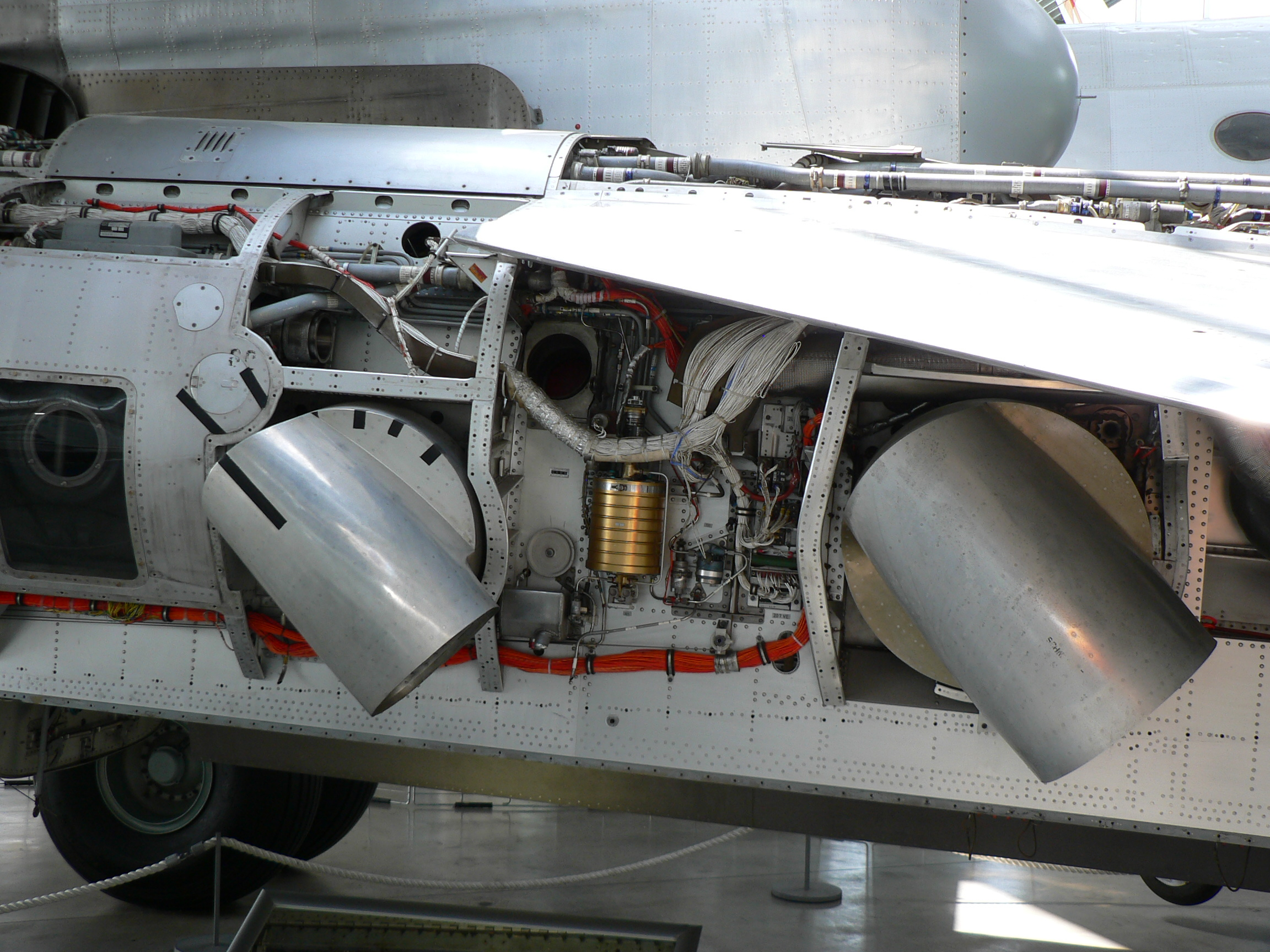
Rotating nozzle detail

The VAK 191B was similar in concept to the British Harrier jump jet, but was designed for a supersonic dash capability (Mach number 1.2–1.4) at medium to high altitudes. It was judged that having a single engine would create too much drag, but the two lift engines were dead weight in cruise, and the small cruise engine gave a poor thrust to weight ratio. The VAK 191B had been provided with relatively small and highly loaded wings. By contrast, the Harrier possessed a significantly higher thrust-to-weight ratio, it was effective as a dogfighter, and had larger wings which were put to good use when performing rolling short takeoffs.

The choice of lift/propulsion system was an obvious critical element of the aircraft's design. According to Flight International, there were several options available in the field of vectored thrust propulsion during its development, these being the twin-nozzle Rolls-Royce/MAN Turbo RB153 and the four-nozzle Bristol Siddeley BS.94 engines. Ultimately, VFW's design team decided to adopt the Rolls-Royce/MAN Turbo RB.193-12 engine to provide both lift and cruise, which was augmented by a pair of Rolls-Royce vertical lift engines. In practice, this arrangement meant during vertical hover, all of the lifting thrust could either be generated by the propulsion engine, or entirely produced by the two lift engines, or some combination thereof; analysis determined that the optimum thrust-generation configuration would be a 50–50 split between both engine types.

During mid-1963, the in-development aircraft received its design designation of VAK 191B. Reportedly, the initials in this designation stood for Vertikalstartendes Aufklärungs-und Kampfflugzeug (in English: vertical take-off reconnaissance and fighter aircraft), the numbers were to indicate its role as a successor to the Fiat G.91, while the B suffix was to show that the aircraft was the second of the four designs to be studied for this purpose. The rate of progress on the programme was noticeably slow; ten years passed between its inception and the first prototype performing its maiden flight on 10 September 1971. The slow progression can be viewed as a natural result of specification changes, such as a revised operational requirement that called for the aircraft to possess greater manoeuvrability issued during 1965.

=== Scaling-back and termination ===
Even prior to the first flight of the type, the programme had been heavily affected by political changes. Amongst these were the effective irrelevance of the original NBMR-3 requirement and the decreasing importance of the strike mission as a result of a German government decision to abandon the nuclear role, a divergence of opinion between partner countries, the withdrawal of the Italian government from participation during August 1967, and a growing awareness of the programme's escalating costs. At one stage, the Italian government had agreed to take on 40 per cent of the programme's development costs, thus their departure meant that a substantial amount of funding was lost for the venture.

The emergence of a new German/American "Advanced Vertical Strike" (AVS) programme also played a role in diminishing the type's perceived value; the prospective aircraft which was on offer from the Americans via a cooperative venture with Germany had somewhat eclipsed the VAK 191B in the eyes of the German Air Force and served to effectively undermine support for the programme. Finally, during 1968, officials at VFW decided that the VAK 191B should be reclassified as an experimental programme, and that the resultant aircraft should principally function only as technology demonstrators instead. The initial programme had called for the construction of three single-seater and three two-seater aircraft; however, amid escalating costs, this intended test batch was first converted to become six single-seat aircraft, and was later on cut down to only involve three single-seat aircraft following Italy's withdrawal.

During April 1969, the first prototype was rolled out at VFW's facility in Bremen, and was later displayed at that year's Hannover Air Show. Over the course of the following 17 months, it went through a flight-qualification programme, during which some issues were discovered, most of these associated with the hydraulic system. During February 1971, trials commenced using the cruise engine for the first time. The first hovering flight performed by the VAK 191B was conducted at Bremen on 20 September 1971.

A total of three VAK 191B aircraft were flown in the flight test program, which was conducted between 1970 and 1975, during which a total of 91 flights were performed. The first transition from vertical flight to horizontal and vice versa was achieved on 26 October 1972 in Munich. At one stage, the prototypes were used for testing some of the concepts that were then being considered for the European MRCA programme (which led to the Panavia Tornado strike fighter), including the use of fly-by-wire technology. According to Flight International, the VAK 191B was well-suited to this purpose due to its modern flight-control system and its general characteristics.

== Surviving aircraft ==
- An example of the VAK 191B can be seen at the Deutsches Museum Flugwerft Schleissheim at Oberschleißheim near Munich.
- The second remaining VAK 191B is part of the Wehrtechnische Studiensammlung (Military technical collection) at Koblenz, Germany.
- The third VAK 191B was reported as being put into storage in 1976. Its current location is at Airbus in Bremen.

== Specifications (VAK 191B) ==
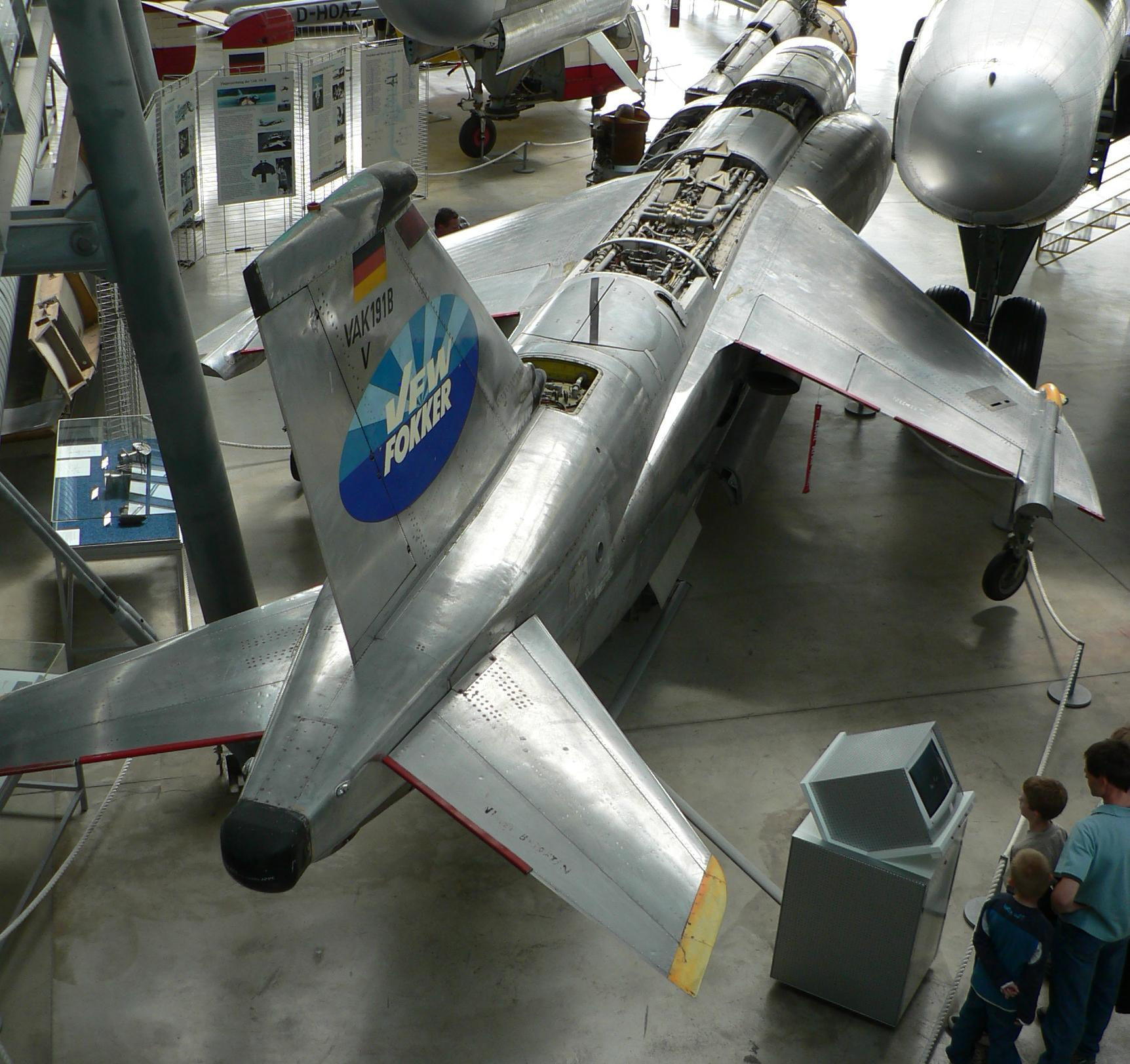
VAK 191B from above

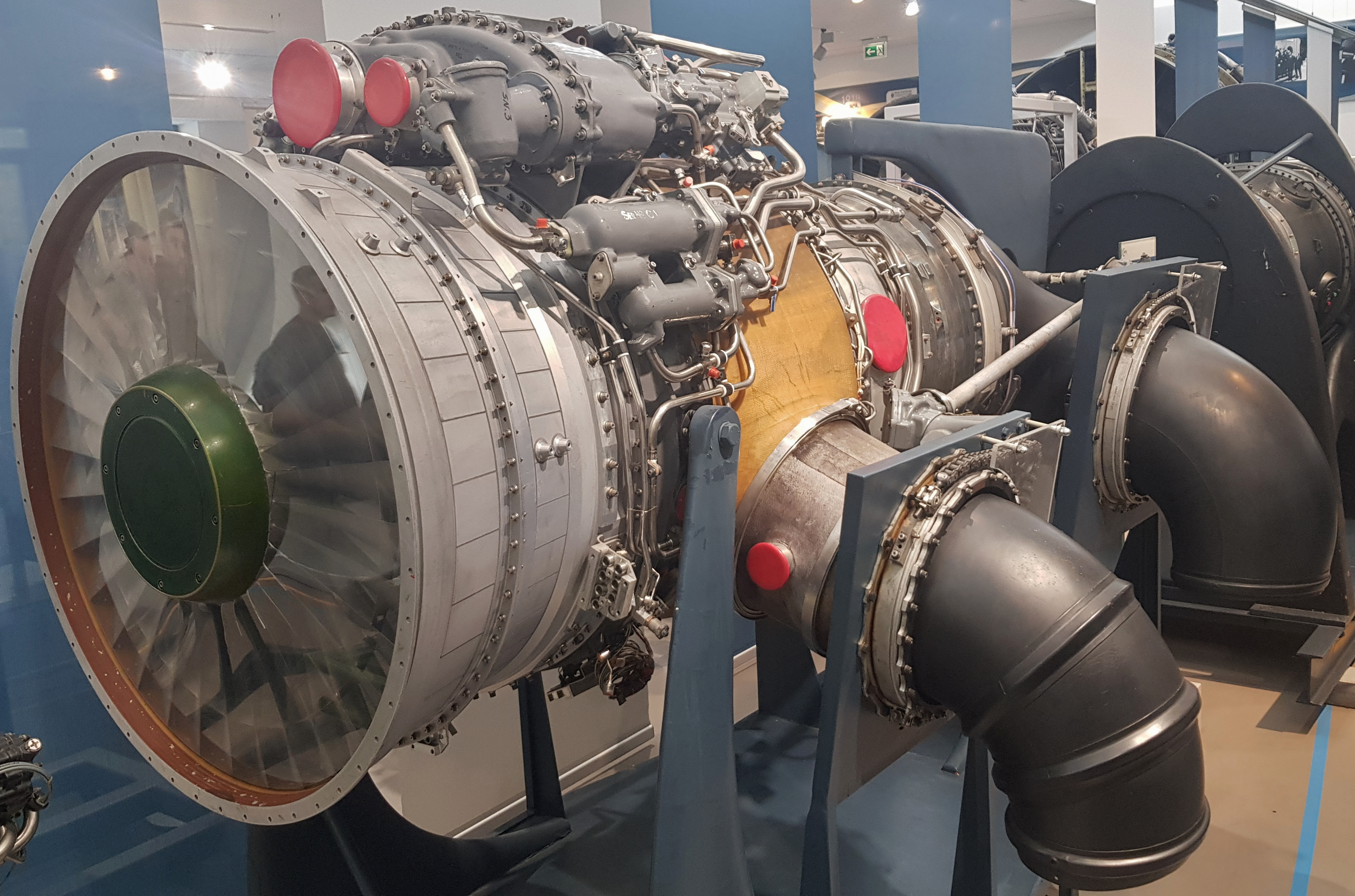
Rolls-Royce/MAN Turbo RB193-12

Data from X-Planes and Prototypes

General characteristics

- Crew: 1
- Length: 16.4 m (53 ft 10 in)
- Wingspan: 6.16 m (20 ft 3 in)
- Height: 4.3 m (14 ft 1 in)
- Wing area: 19 m^{2} (200 sq ft)
- Airfoil: root: NACA 63A005; tip: NACA 65A006
- Empty weight: 5,562 kg (12,262 lb)
- Gross weight: 8,507 kg (18,755 lb)
- Max takeoff weight: 9,000 kg (19,842 lb)
- Powerplant: 1 × Rolls-Royce/MAN Turbo RB193-12 vectored-thrust turbofan engine, 45.2 kN (10,200 lbf) thrust for lift/cruise
- Powerplant: 2 × Rolls-Royce RB162-81F-08 turbojet, 26.5 kN (6,000 lbf) thrust each for lift

Performance

- Maximum speed: 1,108 km/h (688 mph, 598 kn)
- Range: 400 km (250 mi, 220 nmi)
- Service ceiling: 15,000 m (49,000 ft)

== See also ==
- NBMR-3

Aircraft of comparable role, configuration, and era

- EWR VJ 101
- Hawker Siddeley Harrier
- Hawker Siddeley P.1127
- Hawker Siddeley P.1154
- Yakovlev Yak-38

Related lists

- List of fighter aircraft
- List of military aircraft of Germany
