= LFU 205 =

1968 German single-engined four seat experimental aircraft

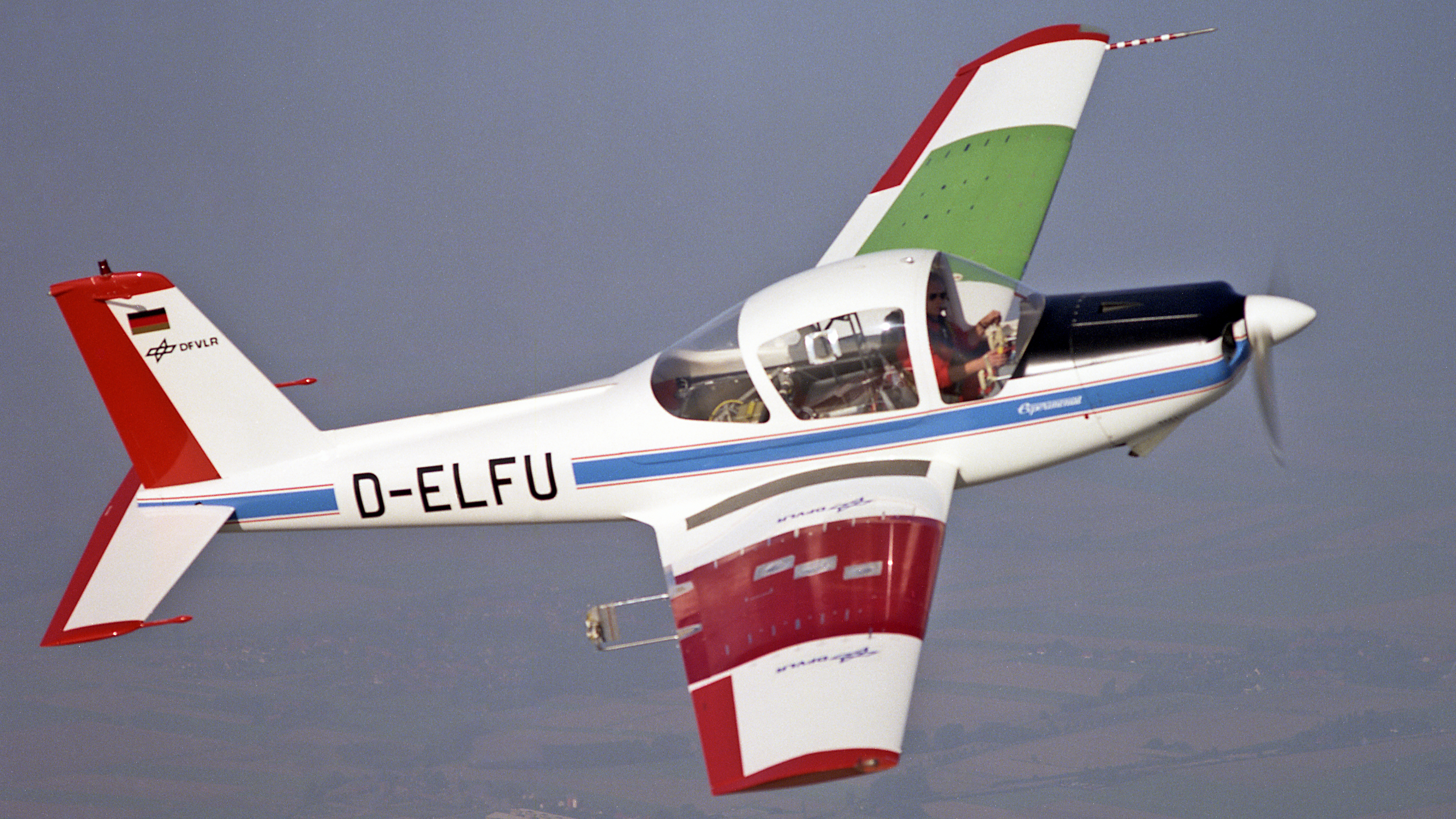

General information
- Type: Experimental light aircraft
- National origin: West Germany
- Manufacturer: Leichtflugtechnik-Union (LFU)
- Status: Museum display
- Primary user: Deutsches Zentrum für Luft- und Raumfahrt (DLR)
- Number built: 1

History
- First flight: 29 March 1968

The LFU 205 is a single-engined, four-seat, low-wing monoplane, that was built in the late 1960s entirely from glass reinforced plastic.

== Design and development ==
The Leichflugtechnik-Union (LFU) was a consortium formed by the Bölkow, Pützer and Rhein-Flugzeugbau companies specifically to produce an aircraft built entirely of glass reinforced plastic (GRP). The result, the LFU 205 was one of the first all-grp light aircraft.

The LFU 205 is a single-engined, low-winged monoplane of conventional appearance apart from slight, 7° forward sweep on the moderately tapered wing. This carries Fowler flaps along the whole trailing edge inboard of the Frise ailerons. The tail surfaces are also straight tapered, with the vertical surfaces slightly swept. The tailplane is a single piece, all moving surface. There are two pairs of side by side seats under a large curved, rearward sliding, canopy. Fuselage and flying surfaces are monocoque structures using a grp sandwich with a smooth outer surface bonded to a corrugated inner skin, the latter formed from parallel 10 mm (0.4 in) tubes wrapped in glass fibre. The corrugations run chordwise, rib-like, in the wings and tail and circumferentially in the fuselage. The tail structures have a foam plastic core.

It is powered by a flat 4-cylinder, 200 hp (150 kW) Lycoming IO-360 engine and has a tricycle undercarriage with inward retracting main legs and an aft retracting nosewheel. The first flight was on 29 March 1968.

== Operational history ==
The LFU 205 was intended as an experimental aircraft and only one was built. The initial flying programme was to test the constructional methods. Since 1984 it has flown with the German Aerospace Centre (DLR) at Brunswick, Germany. It has been used in a research program into laminar flow aerofoils by fitting a "glove" of the new profile over the wings of the LFU 205 in the central sections inboard of the ailerons on both sides. One prime interest is in the transition region between laminar and turbulent flow, studied using infra-red imaging. The gloved regions are also instrumented to gain data on pressure and drag distributions and boundary layer behaviour.

== Aircraft on display ==
- Deutsches Museum Flugwerft Schleissheim - sole example

== Specifications ==
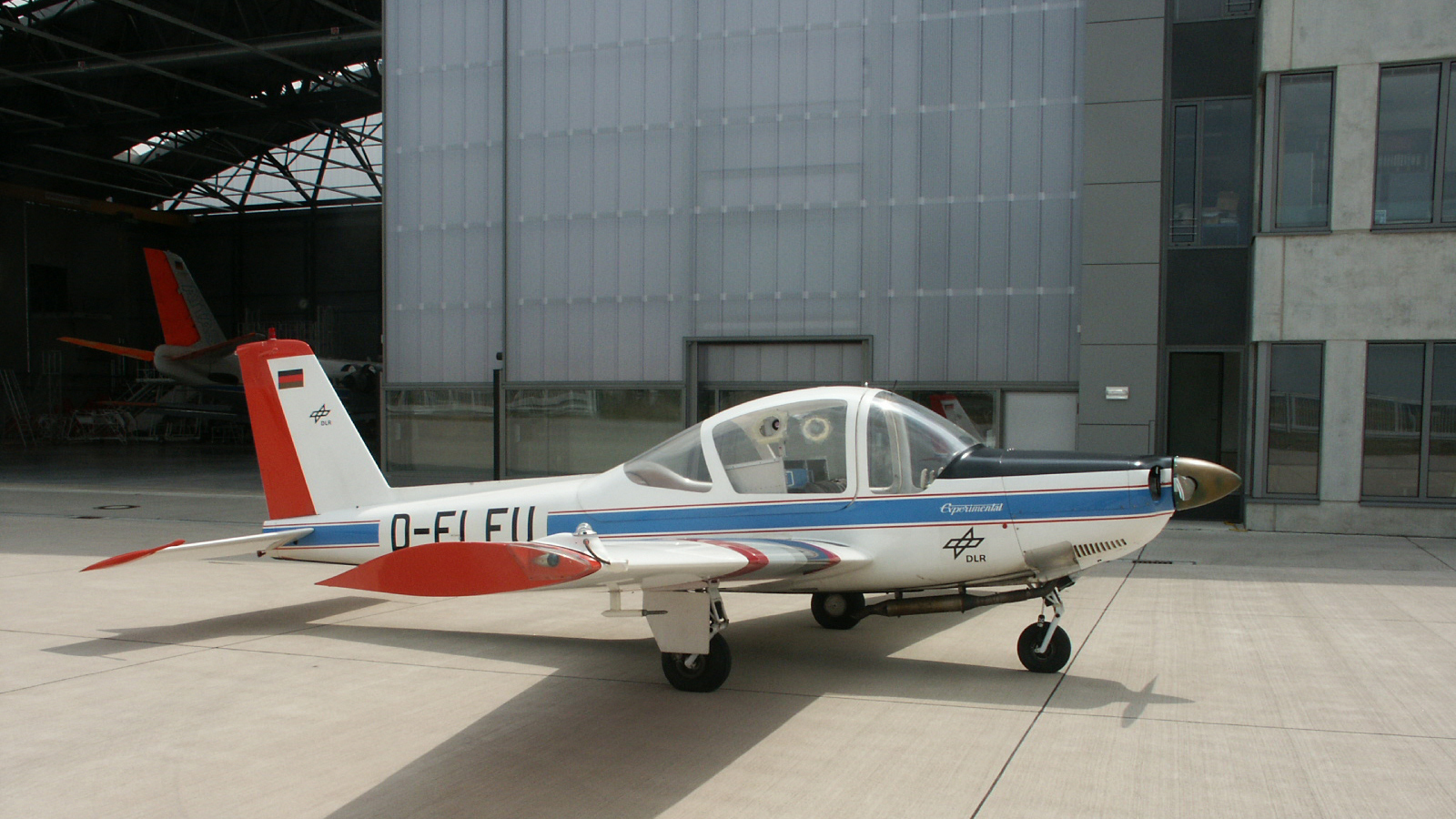
LFU 205

Data from The Observer's Book of Aircraft 1969

General characteristics

- Capacity: 4
- Length: 7.65 m (25 ft 1 in)
- Wingspan: 10.85 m (35 ft 7 in)
- Height: 2.46 m (8 ft 1 in)
- Wing area: 16.4 m^{2} (176 sq ft)
- Empty weight: 700 kg (1,543 lb)
- Gross weight: 1,200 kg (2,645 lb)
- Powerplant: 1 × Lycoming IO-360-A1C 4-cylinder horizontally opposed air cooled piston engine, 150 kW (200 hp)
- Propellers: 2-bladed Hartzell HC-C2YK-1 B variable pitch, 1.93 m (6 ft 4 in) diameter

Performance

- Maximum speed: 360 km/h (220 mph, 190 kn) at sea level
- Cruise speed: 300 km/h (190 mph, 160 kn) maximum
- Range: 1,420 km (880 mi, 760 nmi) at 284 km/h (177 mph), 75% power
- Service ceiling: 5,900 m (19,500 ft)
- Rate of climb: 5.50 m/s (1,082 ft/min) initial
