= MAN Turbo =

Gas turbine manufacturer

MAN Turbo AG
- Industry: Aircraft engines, Turbomachinery
- Defunct: 2010
- Fate: merged
- Successor: MTU München (1969); MAN Diesel & Turbo (2010)
- Headquarters: Munich, Bavaria, Germany
- Parent: MAN AG

MAN Turbo AG was a company based in Oberhausen, Germany, that produced turbomachinery, including compressors, expanders, steam and gas turbines. It was owned by the German conglomerate MAN SE. In 2010, MAN Turbo and MAN Diesel were merged to form MAN Diesel & Turbo.

== History ==
In 1954, BMW formed BMW Studiengesellschaft für Triebwerkbau GmbH as part of West German efforts to resume aircraft engine production. The company was renamed BMW Triebwerkbau GmbH in 1957, and began producing General Electric J79-11A turbojets for the Lockheed F-104G Starfighter program.

In 1960, MAN AG acquired 50 percent of BMW Triebwerkbau GmbH. MAN AG purchased the remainder of the company in 1965, and merged it with MAN Turbomotoren GmbH to form MAN Turbo GmbH.

In Autumn 1968, MAN Turbo and Daimler-Benz formed Entwicklungsgesellschaft für Turbomotoren GmbH (Motoren- und Turbinen-Union München GmbH from 1969) as a 50/50 joint venture, combining their aircraft engine development and manufacturing interests. MAN Turbo remained a separate company under MAN AG.

== Products ==
=== Aeroengines ===
- MAN Turbo 6012
- MAN Turbo 6022
- Rolls-Royce/MAN Turbo RB153
- Rolls-Royce/MAN Turbo RB193
- Turbo-Union RB199

=== Gas turbines ===
- 51/60G, 35/44G, THM 3401, MGT6100, MGT6200, other
