= Dornier Do 31 =

Experimental aircraft in the German Air Force

Do 31
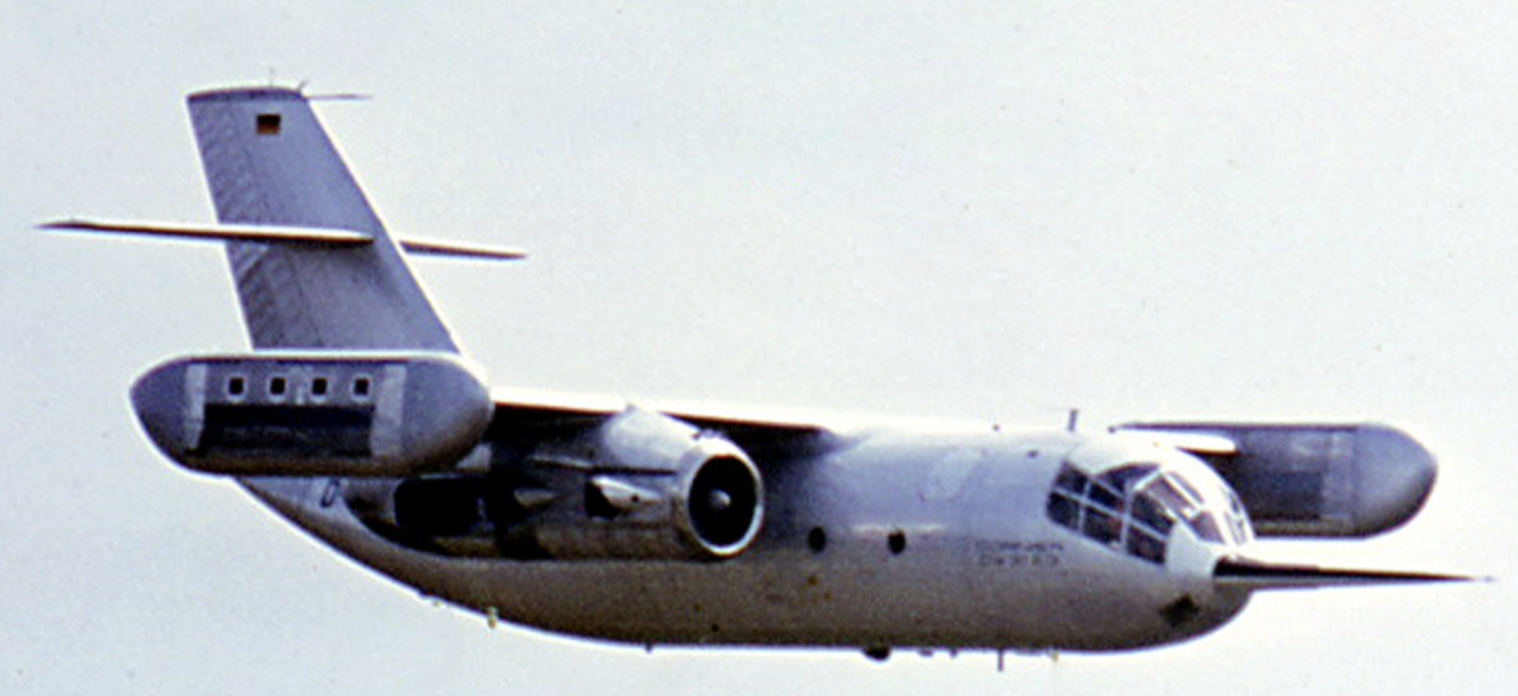
- Dornier Do 31 in 1968

General information
- Type: VTOL transport
- Manufacturer: Dornier Flugzeugwerke
- Status: Project cancelled in April 1970
- Primary user: German Air Force
- Number built: 3

History
- First flight: 10 February 1967
- Variants: Dornier Do 231

The Dornier Do 31 is an experimental, jet-propelled, vertical take-off and landing (VTOL) cargo aircraft that was designed and produced by West German aircraft manufacturer Dornier.

The development of the Do 31 was motivated principally by heavy interest expressed by the German Air Force in the acquisition of short take-off and vertical landing aircraft (STOVL)-capable aircraft. Such ambitions received a further boost from the issuing of NATO specification NBMR-4, which called for a VTOL-capable tactical support aircraft that would be operated in conjunction with the EWR VJ 101, a West German VTOL strike aircraft designed under the NATO contract of BMR-3. A total of three aircraft, two flight-capable and one static airframe, were constructed and used for testing. On 10 February 1967, the Do 31 performed its maiden flight; the first hovering flight of the type took place during July 1967.

In addition to performing test flights, Dornier often demonstrated the Do 31 prototypes to officials and the general public, such as at the 1969 Paris Air Show. Several world records were set by the type during its limited flying career. When the high cost, technical and logistical difficulties of operating such an aircraft were realized, the German Air Force opted to cease trials involving VTOL aircraft, such as the Do 31, VJ101, and the later VFW VAK 191B. In the face of limited sales prospects and a lack of state support, the Do 31 and other VTOL projects lingered as research projects for a time prior to their manufacturers abandoning all activity. The Do 31 remains the only VTOL-capable jet-powered transport aircraft to ever fly.

== Design and development ==
=== Background ===
During the late 1950s and 1960s, the German Air Force became increasingly concerned that, in the event of a major conflict with the Eastern Bloc, its airfields would be highly vulnerable to attack, quickly preventing the use of conventional aircraft in any such conflict. Seeking to counter this threat, the service actively researched the possibility of dispersed operations; one of the options was the use of the nation's Autobahns, which necessitated such aircraft to possess short take-off and vertical landing (STOVL) capabilities. Due to this interest, a series of trials were conducted, which involved the modification of several German Air Force Lockheed F-104 Starfighters so that they could be rocket-launched from stationary ramps; these trials became known as the zero-length launch (ZELL) programme. The Starfighters were to be recovered to short strips using aircraft carrier-type arresting gear; similarly, the later Do 31 was intended to use these same austere air strips as forward operating bases.

As early as 1959, West German aircraft manufacturer Dornier had been informally working on several VTOL-related concepts, although it would not be until 1961 that the design team would formalise what would become the Do 31. Early activity centred around a series of studies on the topic of a VTOL-capable utility transport aircraft. Dornier's design team, based at the company's facility in Friedrichshafen, was headed by the aeronautical engineer Gustav Wieland. Already at this stage, Dornier was liaising with foreign companies, including British engine manufacturer Bristol Siddeley, who were independently working on their own VTOL-orientated engine already.

The design of the flight control system was considered to be a critical element of any aircraft performing vertical flight, particularly in how it handled control failures. To support the development programme, a purpose-built flight control test rig was constructed by Dornier, which allowed their design team to explore and evaluate different attitude control laws and flying qualities. To solve the differential equations necessary to model the aircraft in detail, the Dornier DO-960 hybrid computer was developed. In spite of allowances to facilitate control during vertical flight, the flight control philosophy used upon the Do 31 was more akin to a conventional aircraft than that of a helicopter.

=== Programme launch and design ===
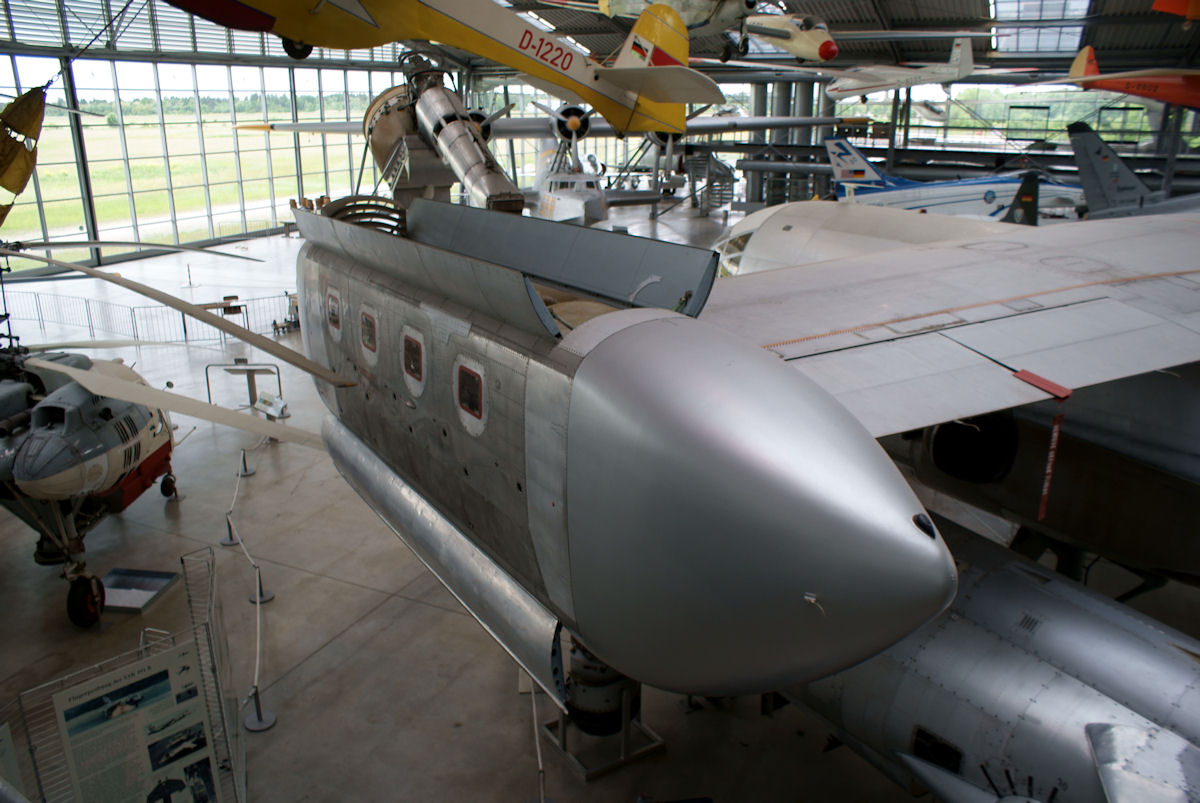
Fairings at the top of a lift nacelle in the open position

During February 1962, the formal launch of the Do 31 programme occurred with the issuing of a development contract from the West German government. By the start of 1964, Dornier had started building a pair of prototype aircraft; their manufacture was largely performed at the company's Oberpfaffenhofen plant. A total of three test prototypes were constructed, these being E1, E2 and E3 - the "E" indicating Experimentell (Experimental). E1 was powered only by the Pegasus engines, having been designed to test horizontal flight. E2 was a static test airframe, and did not ever fly. E3 was furnished with both Pegasus and RB162 lift engines installed, being intended to evaluate the design's vertical flight mode.

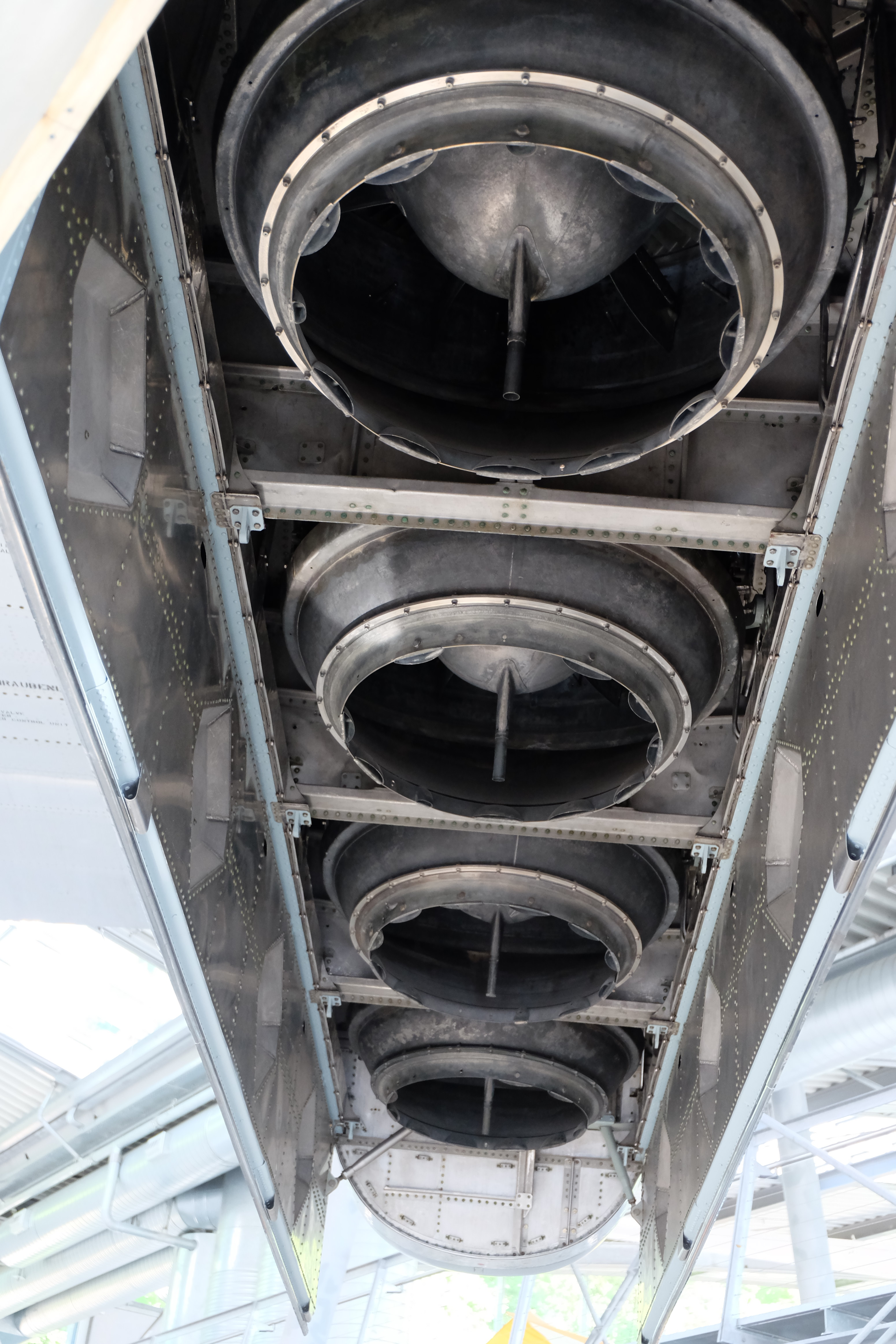
The four Rolls-Royce RB162 lift engines seen from the bottom of a nacelle

The design of the Do 31 was heavily reliant upon its engine configuration. Dornier had opted to incorporate the British-built Bristol Pegasus (Note: By the time of the first flight, Rolls-Royce had taken over Bristol Engines.) vectored-thrust turbofan engine, an existing powerplant that was most famously used to power the Harrier jump jet. On the Do 31, a pair of Pegasus engines were housed in each of the two inboard nacelles; during the vertical phase of flight, additional lift was provided by an arrangement of four vertically mounted Rolls-Royce RB162 lift engines located in each of the outer nacelles.

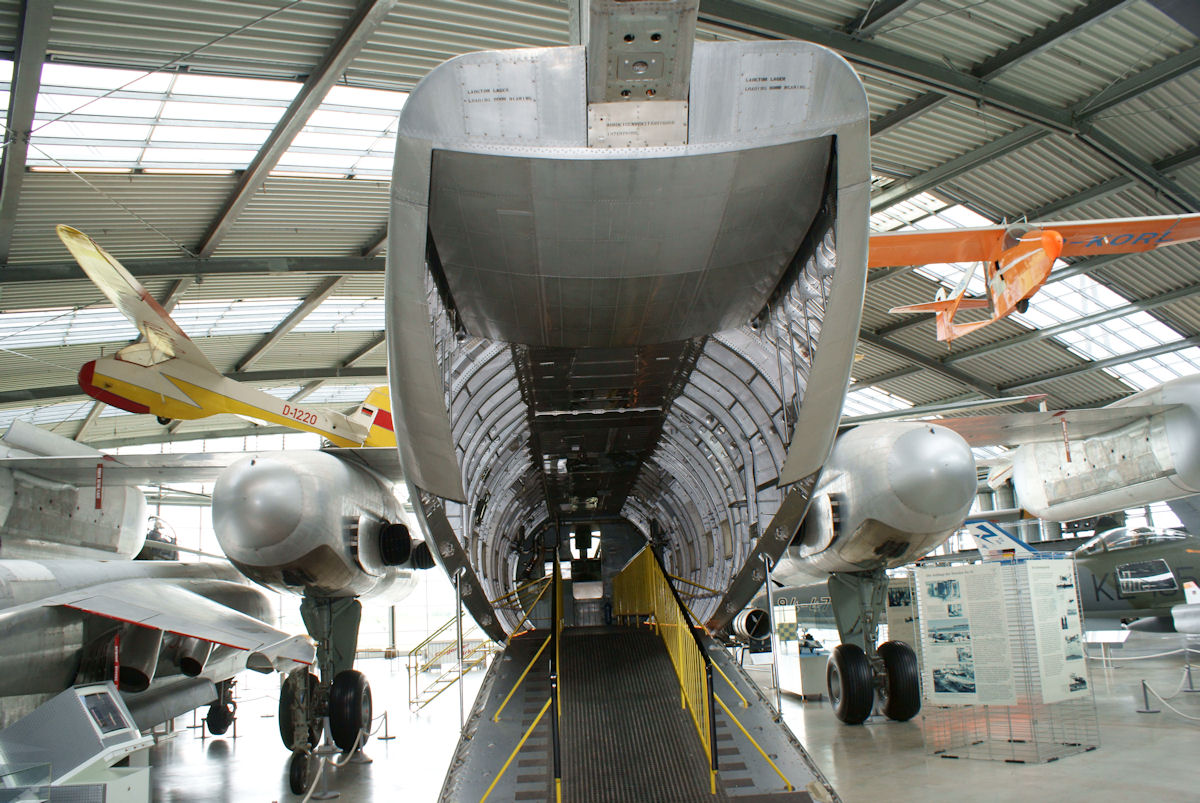
Cargo area

By mounting the engines in pods, the fuselage could accommodate a capacious hold for storing cargo, which was primarily accessed via a rear-facing loading ramp. Early designs of the Do 31 used more than four Rolls-Royce RB162s; the availability of more powerful versions of the Pegasus engine enabled the reduction to four supplemental lift engines. Due to the engines being placed in nacelles, as opposed to within the fuselage as on the Harrier, the Pegasus had to be specially modified for the Do 31.

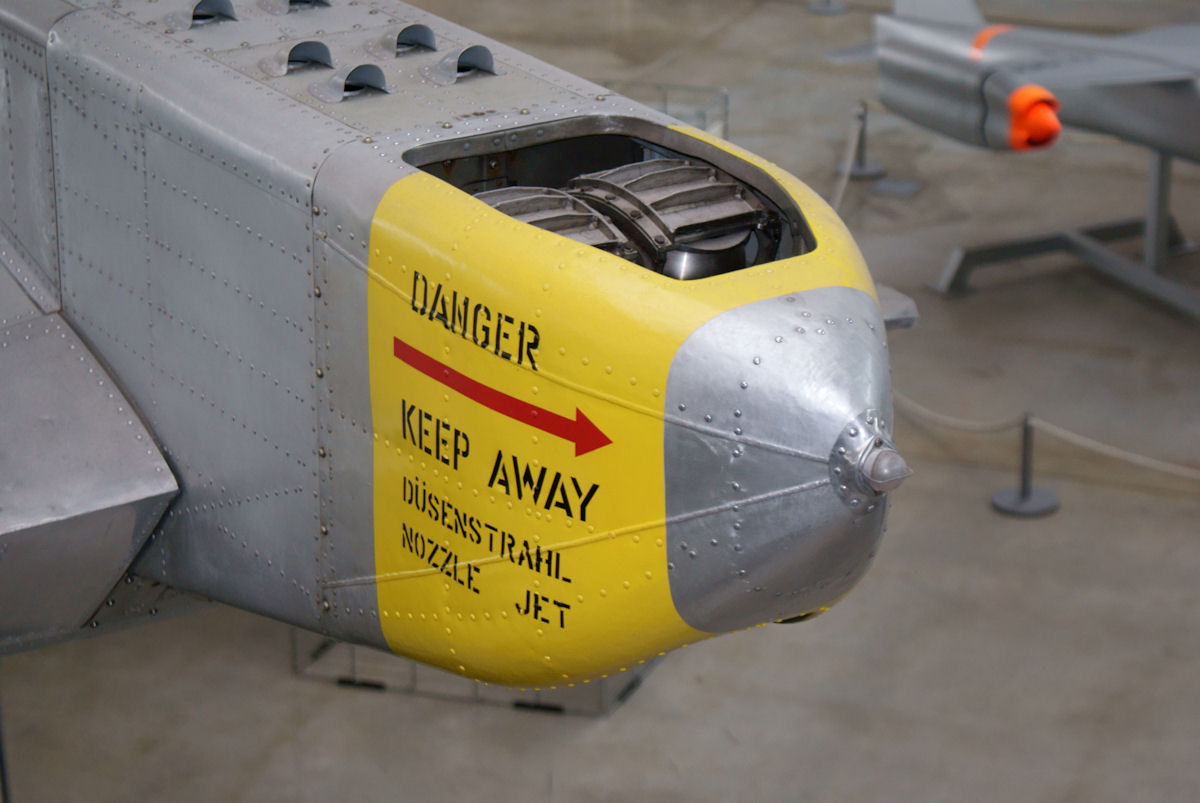
Pitch control nozzles in the tail, fed from the Pegasus engines, two pointing up, two pointing down

Beyond providing adequate lift and control, other factors influenced the propulsion system. According to Dow, noise was a considerable concern, particularly as the airframe's critical frequency was close to that which was naturally generated by the lift engines. The re-ingestion of hot exhaust gasses was another critical area, complicated by there being 16 'fountains' of gas being generated during vertical hover, 12 of which being hot. Following intense study during the flight testing phase of development, it was determined that positioning the nozzles at an angle of 85-degrees, rather than 90-degrees, was sufficient to avoid encountering any issue during takeoff, while no such issues were observed during landings at all. Several different types of air intakes were also trialled, both to deter ingestion issues and the uneven start-up of the lift engines. Bleed air was also drawn from the Pegasus engines to the lift engines as a measure to address ingestion issues, while dedicated studies were performed on ground erosion effects.

=== Into flight ===
On 10 February 1967, the first prototype (E1) conducted its maiden flight, powered by just the two Pegasus engines. During July 1967, the third prototype (E3), which was furnished with all ten of its engines, performed the first hovering flight. During December 1967, forward-and-backward transitions between vertical and horizontal phases of flight were successfully conducted. On 28 February 1968, the first flight involving multiple transitions was performed. According to aviation author Andrew Dow, while some initial teething issues were encountered, confidence in the aircraft grew quickly. As the flight envelope was explored, test pilot Drury W. Wood performed several exploratory manoeuvres while flying the Do 31, on one occasion deliberately flying it backwards to prove it could be done and performing a barrel roll on another.

Seeking to garner publicity for its new aircraft, Dornier flew one of the prototypes to the 1969 Paris Air Show, where it was demonstrated to the general public. The ferry flight to reach the event established multiple Fédération Aéronautique Internationale (FAI) world records for the type. Public recognition was viewed as particularly valuable in light of Dornier's long-term ambitions for the Do 31, as the company foresaw civilian uses for the aircraft as a commercial VTOL transport. At one point, Dornier was negotiating with both Douglas Aircraft and Ling-Temco-Vought (LTV) for involvement in the Do 31 programme, even rejecting one approach made by Douglas.

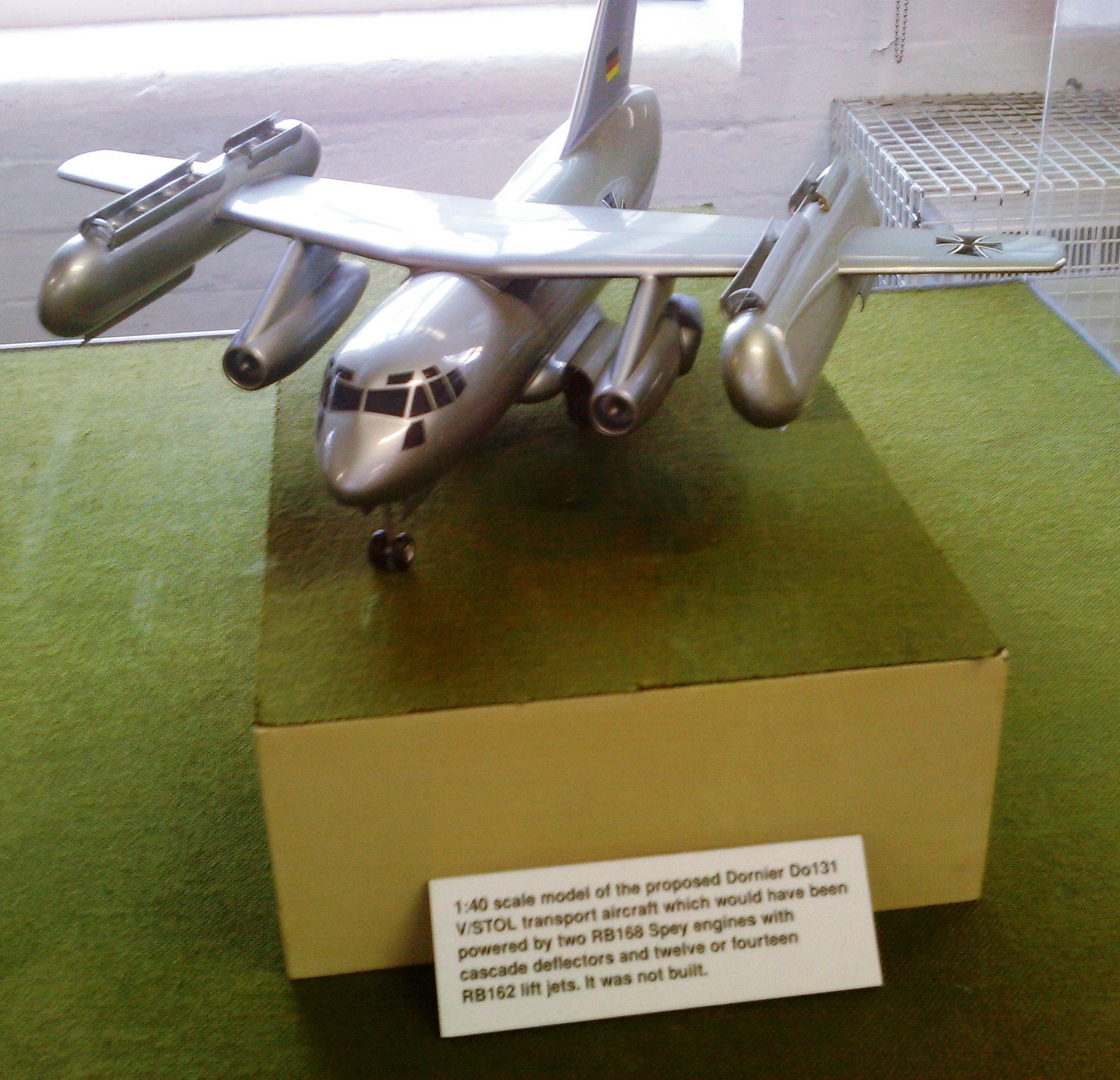
Model of the unrealised prototype Do 131

The Do 31 was the first, and so far only, vertical takeoff jet transport ever built. During April 1970, it was announced that the project had been terminated, although the Do 31 performed its final public flight on 4 May 1970 during the Internationale Luft- und Raumfahrtausstellung (ILA) in Hannover. One of the alleged contributing factors towards the Do 31's cancellation was the relatively large drag and weight imposed by the lift engine pods, which reduced both the useful payload and range of the type compared to conventional transport aircraft. According to Dow, the German government had been frustrated by a lack of commitment forthcoming from other NATO countries, and was unwilling to contribute alone to the high funding requirement needs for full-scale development.

During a later stage of development, Dornier planned to dispense with the Do 31's outer nacelles and their engines; in their place, larger RB153 turbofan engines, each capable of generating approximately 5,000 lbf (22 kN) of thrust, would have been adopted once this powerplant had become available. A further development of the Do 31, referred to as the Do 131, intended to be powered by either twelve or fourteen liftjets, was also explored by Dornier; however, no prototype of this variant was ever constructed.

== Aircraft on display ==
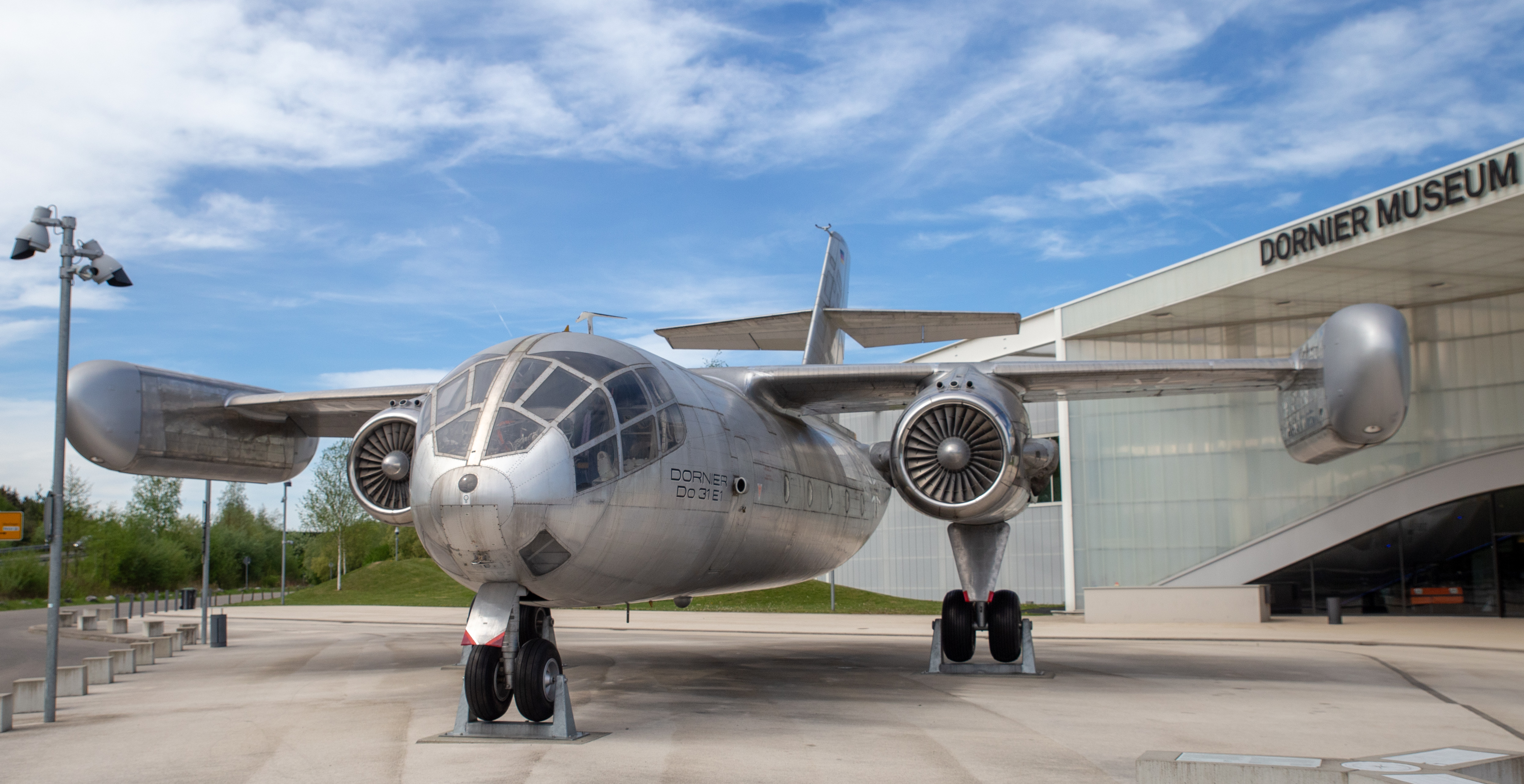
Do 31 E1 at the Dornier Museum Friedrichshafen

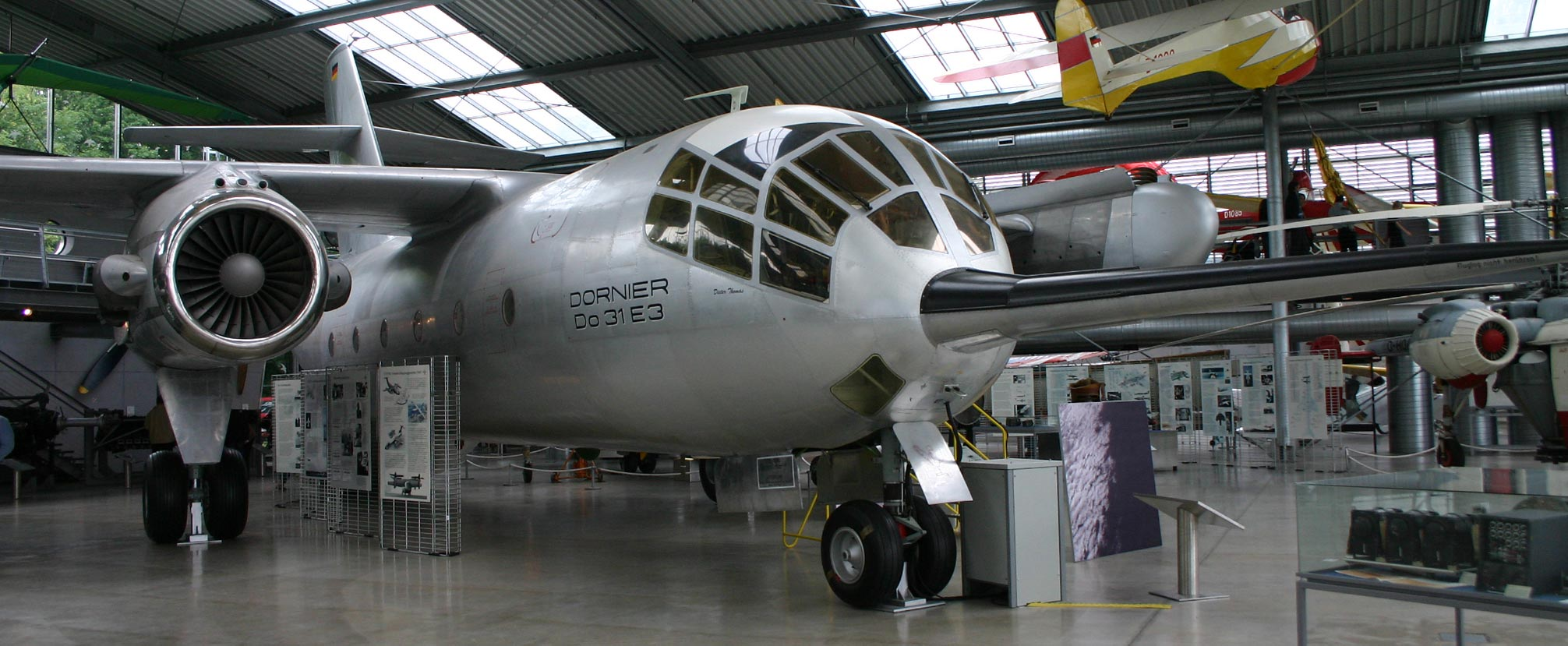
Do 31 E3 at the Deutsches Museum Flugwerft Schleissheim

Both flying prototypes have been preserved in Germany, but the fate and current location of the non-flying testbed (E2) is not known.

- Dornier Do 31 E1, D-9530, is preserved and displayed at the Dornier Museum Friedrichshafen.
- Dornier Do 31 E3, D-9531, was initially put into storage at Oberpfaffenhofen, then for several years on display in the open in the courtyard of the Deutsches Museum in Munich and after restoration is now on display at the Deutsches Museum Flugwerft Schleissheim at Oberschleissheim near Munich

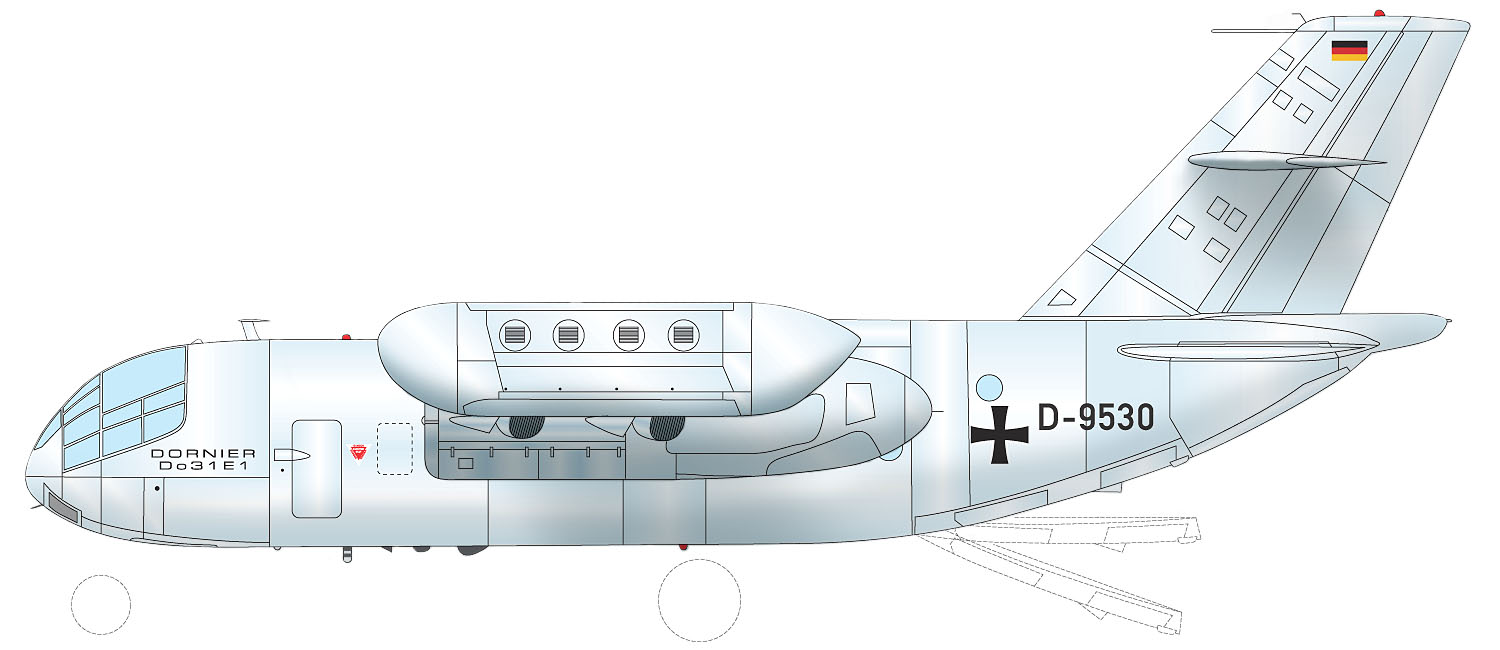
Artist drawing

== Specifications (Do 31E) ==
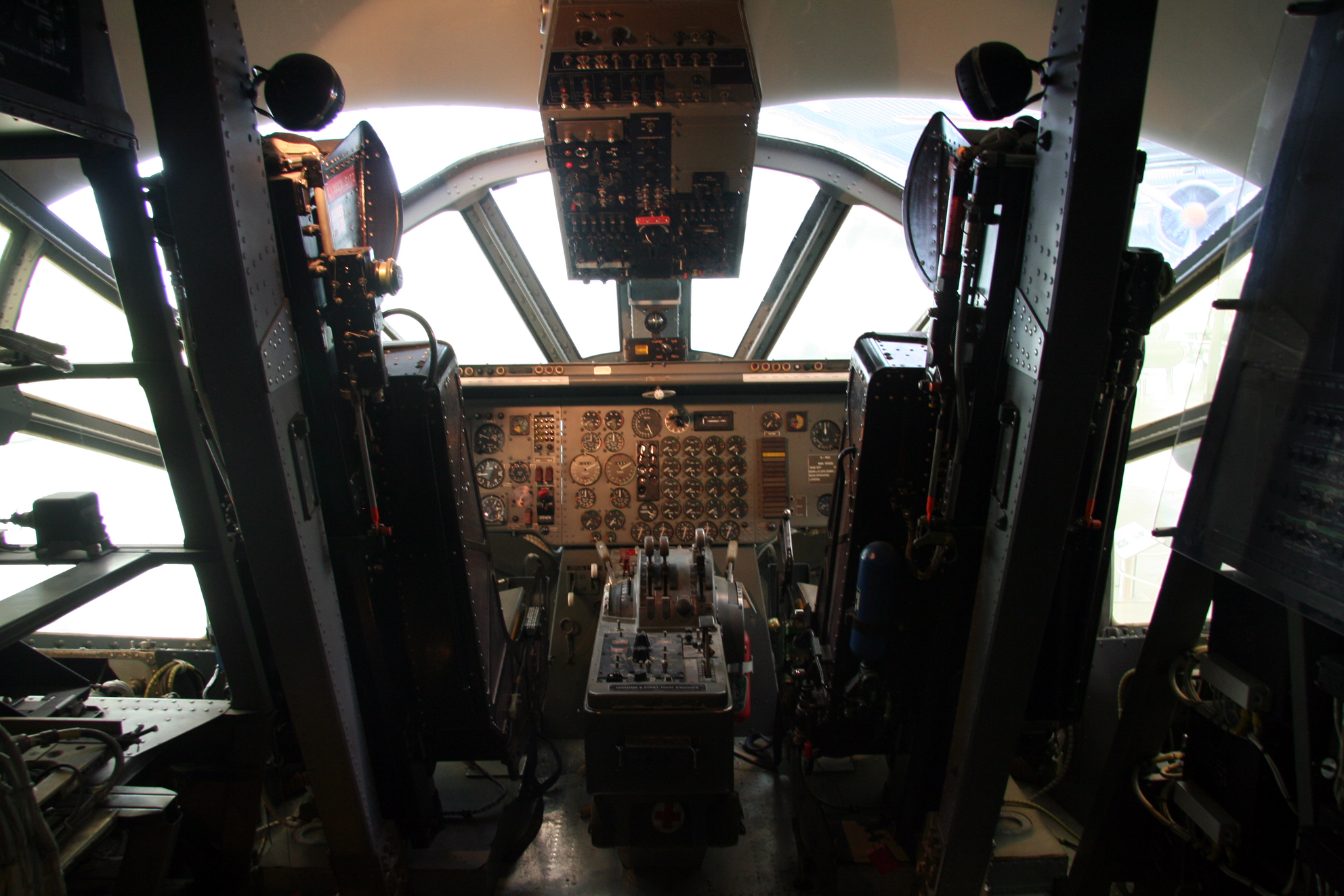
Flight deck of the Do 31

Data from The Observers Book of Aircraft.

General characteristics

- Crew: Two
- Capacity: 36 troops or 24 casualty stretchers and 3,500 kg (7,715 lb) useful load
- Length: 20.53 m (67 ft 4 in)
- Wingspan: 18 m (59 ft 3 in)
- Height: 8.53 m (28 ft 0 in)
- Wing area: 57 m^{2} (613.56 sq ft)
- Gross weight: 22,453 kg (49,500 lb) (VTOL)
- Max takeoff weight: 27,422 kg (60,500 lb)
- Powerplant: 2 × Rolls-Royce Pegasus BE.53/2 turbofan, 68.95 kN (15,500 lbf) thrust each
- Powerplant: 8 × Rolls-Royce RB162-4D Vertically mounted turbojet lift engines, 19.57 kN (4,400 lbf) thrust each

Performance

- Maximum speed: 730 km/h (452 mph, 393 kn)
- Cruise speed: 650 km/h (404 mph, 351 kn)
- Range: 1,800 km (1,120 mi, 970 nmi) with maximum payload
- Service ceiling: 10,700 m (35,100 ft)
- Rate of climb: 19.2 m/s (3,780 ft/min) -using Pegasus engines only

== See also ==
Related development

- Dornier Do 231

Aircraft of comparable role, configuration, and era

- Armstrong Whitworth AW.681
- LTV XC-142

Related lists

- List of military aircraft of Germany
