= Rolls-Royce/MAN Turbo RB.193 =

RB.193
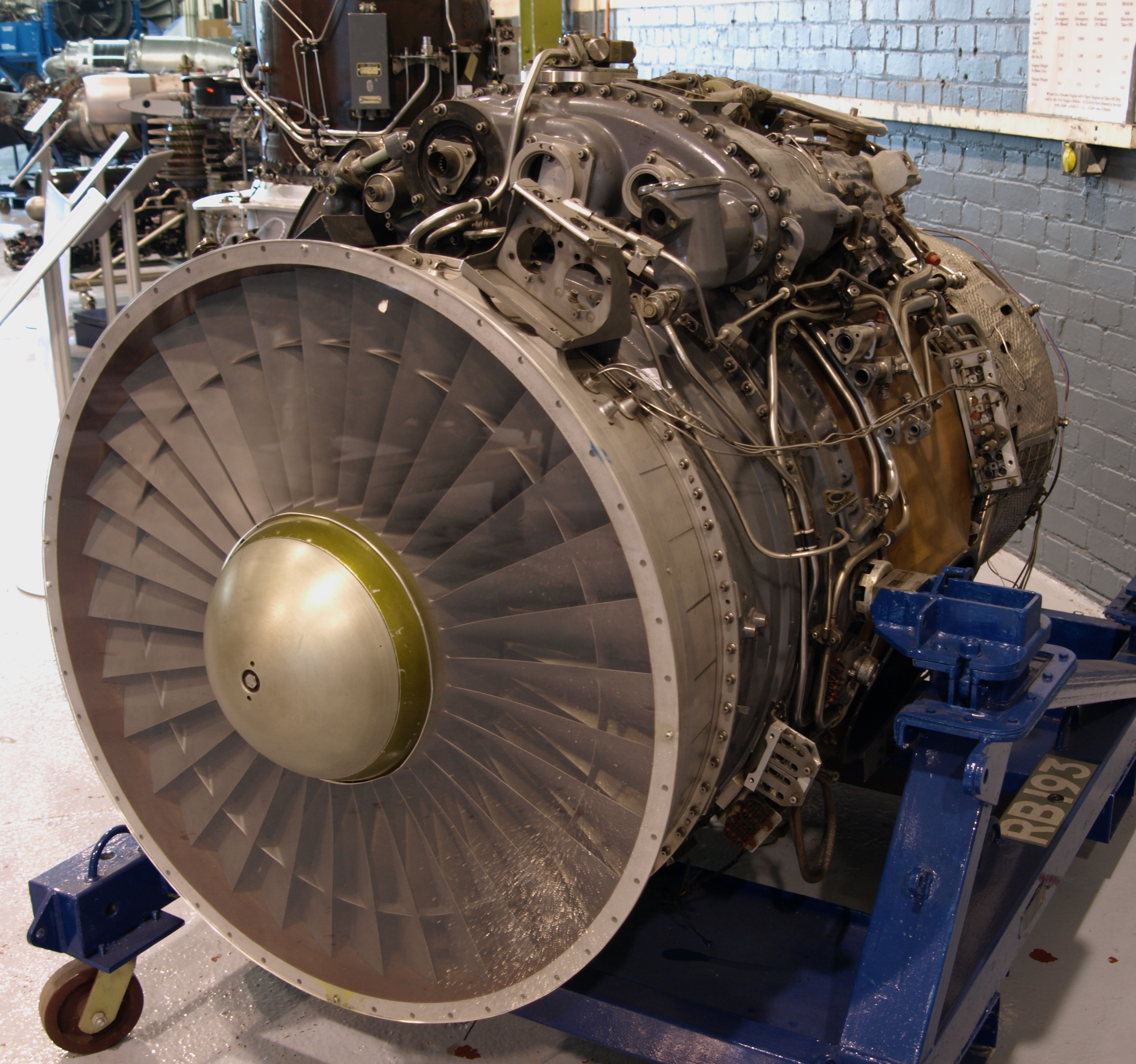
- Rolls-Royce/MAN Turbo RB.193-12 turbofan engine on display at the Rolls-Royce Heritage Trust, Derby
- Type: Vectored thrust turbofan
- Manufacturer: Rolls-Royce Limited/MAN Turbo/Bristol Siddeley
- First run: December 1967
- Major applications: VFW VAK 191B

The Rolls-Royce/MAN Turbo RB.193 is a vectored thrust turbofan engine designed and manufactured by Rolls-Royce and MAN Turbo in the mid-1960s. The engine test flew in its sole application, the VFW VAK 191B VTOL fighter aircraft but production did not follow after cancellation of the associated aircraft project.

== Design and development ==
The RB.193 was a joint development project by Rolls-Royce/MAN Turbo originally designed to meet a requirement for the VFW VAK 191B project, design work commenced after a contract from the Federal German Ministry of Defence was signed in December 1965. Bristol Siddeley (from 1966 part of Rolls-Royce) were sub-contracted to manufacture components for the engine.

The design was similar in concept and closely related to the earlier Bristol Siddeley Pegasus, employing the same layout of 'hot' and 'cold' pairs of rotating thrust nozzles, internal airflow was the same as the Spey. The engine first ran at Derby in December 1967 with flight testing of the VFW VAK 191B commencing in 1971 with the first free hovering flight taking place at Bremen on 10 September. The aircraft later successfully transitioned from hovering to forward flight at Manching in October 1972. By the end of the test programme in 1975 the RB.193 had accumulated 12 hours of flight time and 91 flights.

== Applications ==
- VFW VAK 191B

== Engines on display ==
A VFW VAK 191B aircraft fitted with an RB.193-12 is on display at the Deutsches Museum Flugwerft Schleissheim, panels have been removed to allow viewing of the rotating nozzle and mechanisms.

== Specifications (RB.193-12) ==
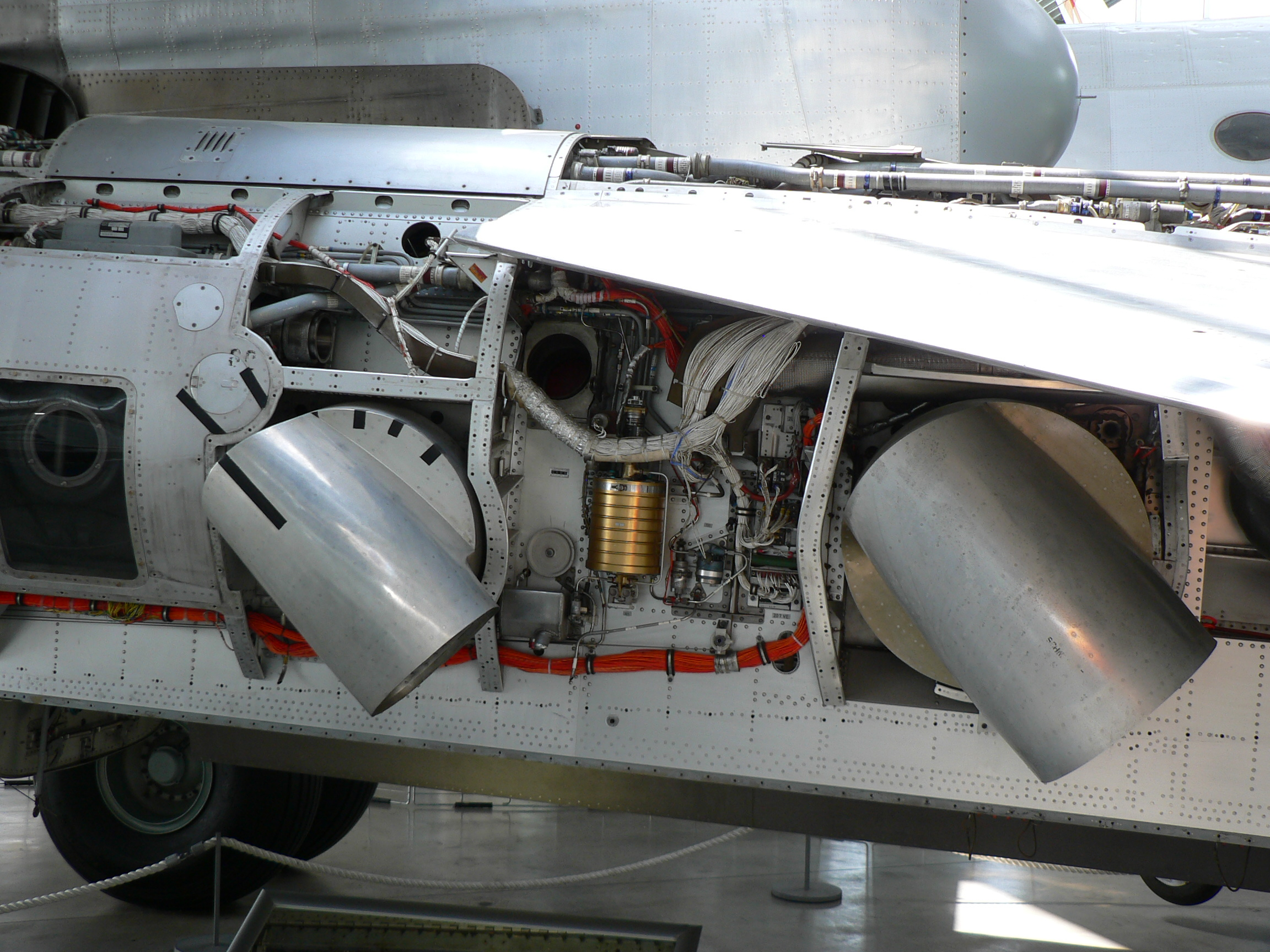
Rotating nozzle detail of the RB.193

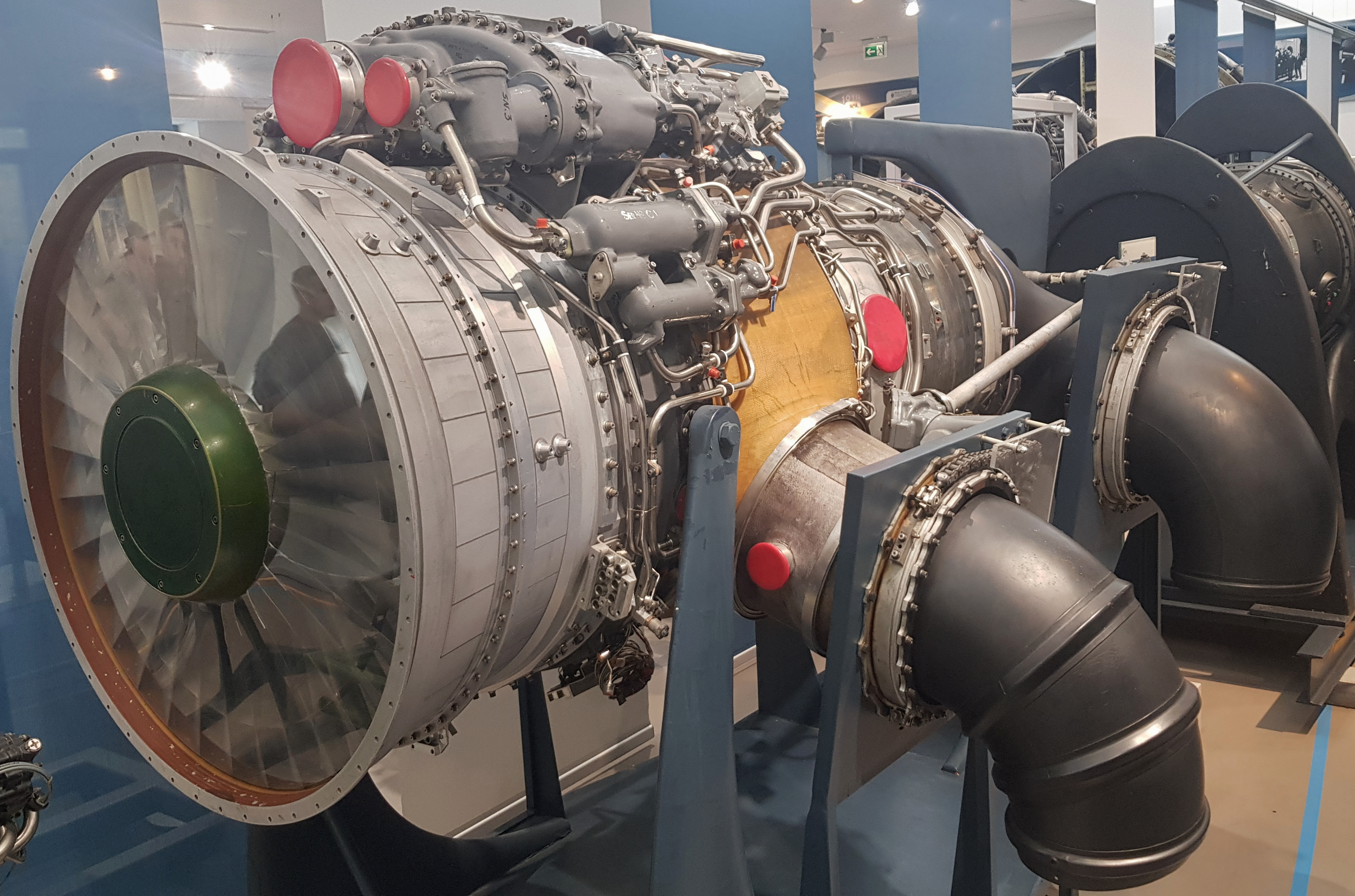
Rolls-Royce/MAN Turbo RB193-12, built 1967

Data from World Encyclopaedia of Aero Engines. Jane's all the World's Aircraft 1972–73, Aircraft engines of the World 1970

==== General characteristics ====
- Type: High bypass twin-spool vectored-thrust turbofan
- Length: 2,530 mm (100 in)
- Diameter: 859 mm (33.8 in) (Internal fan diameter)
- Frontal area: 0.58 m^{2} (6.2 sq ft)
- Dry weight: 790 kg (1,740 lb) unequipped dry weight; 1,050 kg (2,310 lb) Installed weight

==== Components ====
- Compressor: Axial compressor, Three-stage fan/LP, two-stage IP, counter-rotating six-stage HP
- Combustors: Annular combustion chamber
- Turbine: Three-stage LP, single-stage HP (counter-rotating)
- Fuel type: Aviation Kerosene, JP-4, JP-5
- Oil system: Pressure spray at 4.8 bar (70 psi) with scavenge

==== Performance ====
- Maximum thrust: 45.21 kN (10,163 lbf)
- Overall pressure ratio: 16.5:1
- Bypass ratio: 1.12:1
- Air mass flow:

- Overall mass flow: 93 kg/s (210 lb/s) at 10,700 rpm
- Bypass mass flow: 49 kg/s (110 lb/s)
- HP compressor mass flow: 44 kg/s (97 lb/s)

- Turbine inlet temperature: TIT 1,440 K (1,167 °C)
- Specific fuel consumption: 65 kg/kN/h (0.64 lb/lbf/h)
- Thrust-to-weight ratio: 4.38

== See also ==
- Rolls-Royce/MAN Turbo RB153

Related development

- Rolls-Royce Pegasus
- Rolls-Royce Spey

Comparable engines

- Bristol Siddeley BS100

Related lists

- List of aircraft engines
