= Dornier Do 231 =

German VTOL transport aircraft project

Do 231

General information
- Type: VTOL transport aircraft
- Manufacturer: Dornier Flugzeugwerke
- Status: Cancelled
- Primary user: Lufthansa (intended)
- Number built: 0

History
- Developed from: Dornier Do 31

The Dornier Do 231 was a 1970s VTOL transport aircraft project developed by Dornier.

== Design and development ==
The Do 231 was a result of a design competition conducted in the early 1970s by the German Federal Ministry of Economics to create a 100-person VTOL transport aircraft. Based on the earlier Do 31, the Do 231 was to have shoulder-mounted cantilever swept wings and a T-tail.

The 1973 oil crisis rendered the Do 231 proposal as uneconomical due to the high fuel consumption necessary for vertical takeoff and landing, and the aircraft was cancelled in 1976 without a single prototype being built.

== Variants ==
Do 231C
Commercial variant for Lufthansa with a capacity of 100 passengers.
Do 231M
Military variant with a stretched fuselage and a rear loading ramp.

== Specifications (Do 231C) ==
Data from

General characteristics

- Capacity: 100 passengers
- Length: 35.55 m (116 ft 8 in)
- Wingspan: 26.0 m (85 ft 4 in)
- Height: 9.55 m (31 ft 4 in)
- Wing area: 120 m^{2} (1,300 sq ft)
- Aspect ratio: 5.63
- Powerplant: 2 × Rolls-Royce RB.220 jet engines
- Powerplant: 12 × Rolls-Royce RB.202-25 lift engines

Performance

- Cruise speed: 900 km/h (560 mph, 490 kn)

== See also ==
Related development

- Dornier Do 31
