= Dornier DO-960 =

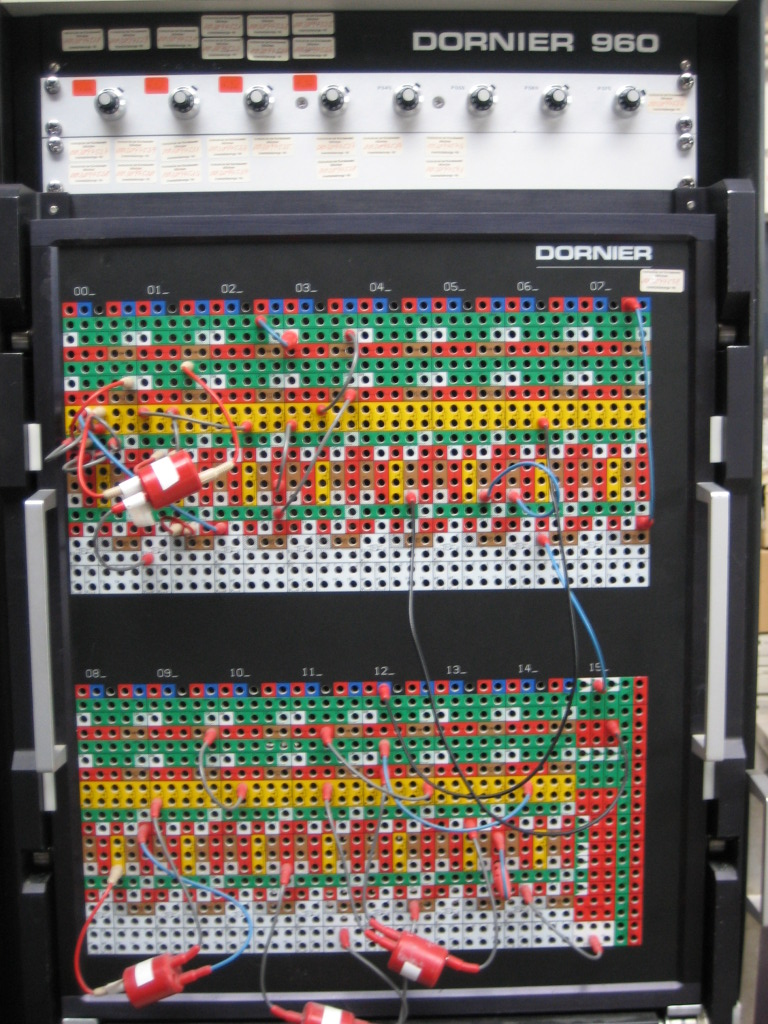
Dornier 960

The Dornier DO-960 was a hybrid computer designed for the Dornier Do 31 experimental VTOL aircraft.

The hybrid approach was necessary because the computations for controlling VTOL were not feasible with digital computers available at that time. Vertical take-off requires solving complex differential equations in real-time. The DO-960 incorporates both digital computer and analog computer elements. The analog units are fit for solving computationally challenging differential equations, while the digital units are responsible for controlling the overall program flow.

Although known primarily for aircraft, Dornier had been building analog and hybrid computers as soon as it started engineering vertical takeoff aircraft. The Dornier DO-960 was the last known hybrid computer of this series.
