= Deutsches Museum Flugwerft Schleissheim =

Coordinates: 48°14′47″N 11°33′28″E

Flugwerft Schleissheim
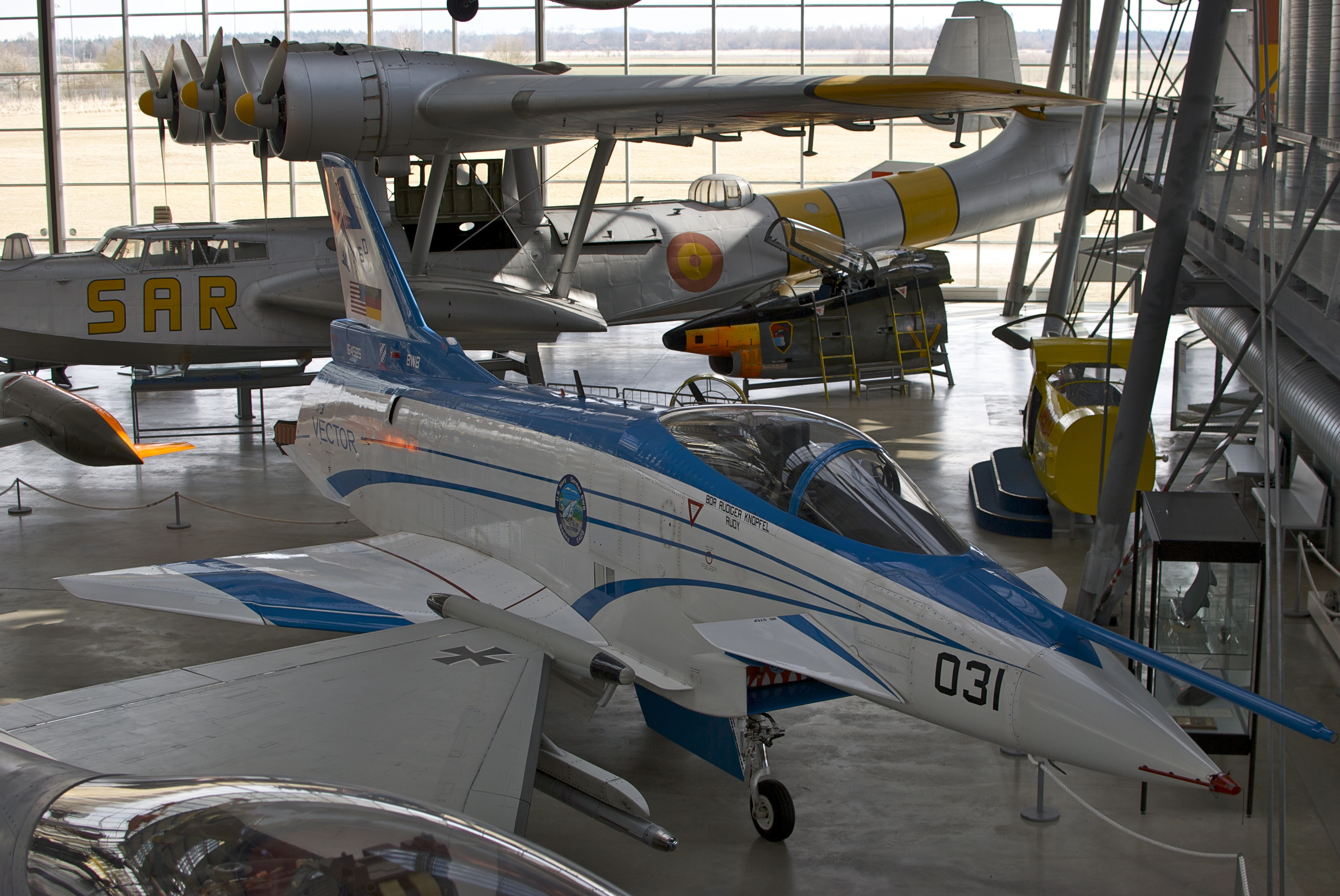
- Established: 1992
- Location: Oberschleißheim, Munich
- Type: Aviation museum
- Website: www.deutsches-museum.de/flugwerft-schleissheim

Flugwerft Schleissheim is an aviation museum located in the German town of Oberschleißheim near Munich, it forms part of the Deutsches Museum collection and complements the aviation exhibits on display at the main site. The museum was opened on 18 September 1992. Many aerospace exhibits are on display including fixed-wing aircraft, helicopters and aircraft engines. The main display hangar is a restored glazed building, visitors are able to view exhibits undergoing restoration.

== Aircraft on display ==
List from Deutsches Museum Flugwerft Schleissheim.

=== Piston engine aircraft ===
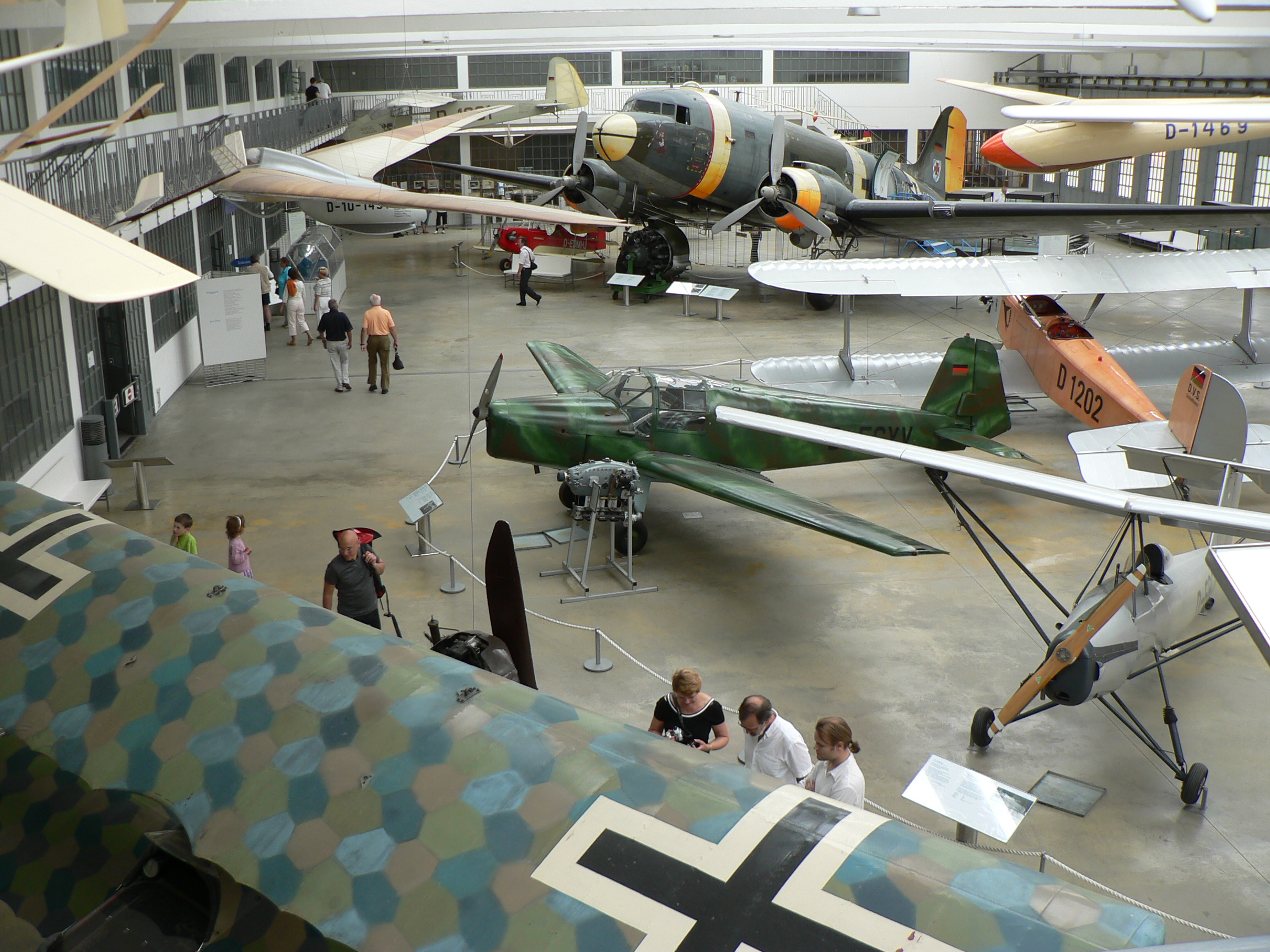
Piston engined aircraft on display

- Arado Ar 66 (remains)
- Arco ultralight
- Bölkow Bo 209 Monsun
- Brunswick LF-1 Zaunkönig
- Bücker Bü 181 Bestmann
- CASA 2.111B
- Cessna 195
- Dornier Do 24 T-3
- Douglas C-47D
- Fairchild 24
- Focke-Wulf Fw 44J Stieglitz
- Fokker D.VII
- Hirth Acrostar
- Klemm Kl 25
- Lancair IV
- LFU 205
- SIAT 223 Flamingo
- Müller DDMH 22
- Pützer Motorraab
- Raab Krähe
- Ranger M ultralight
- Udet U 12 Flamingo
- Vollmoeller
- Waco YKS-6
- Yakovlev Yak-50

=== Jet and turboprop aircraft ===
List from Deutsches Museum Flugwerft Schleissheim.

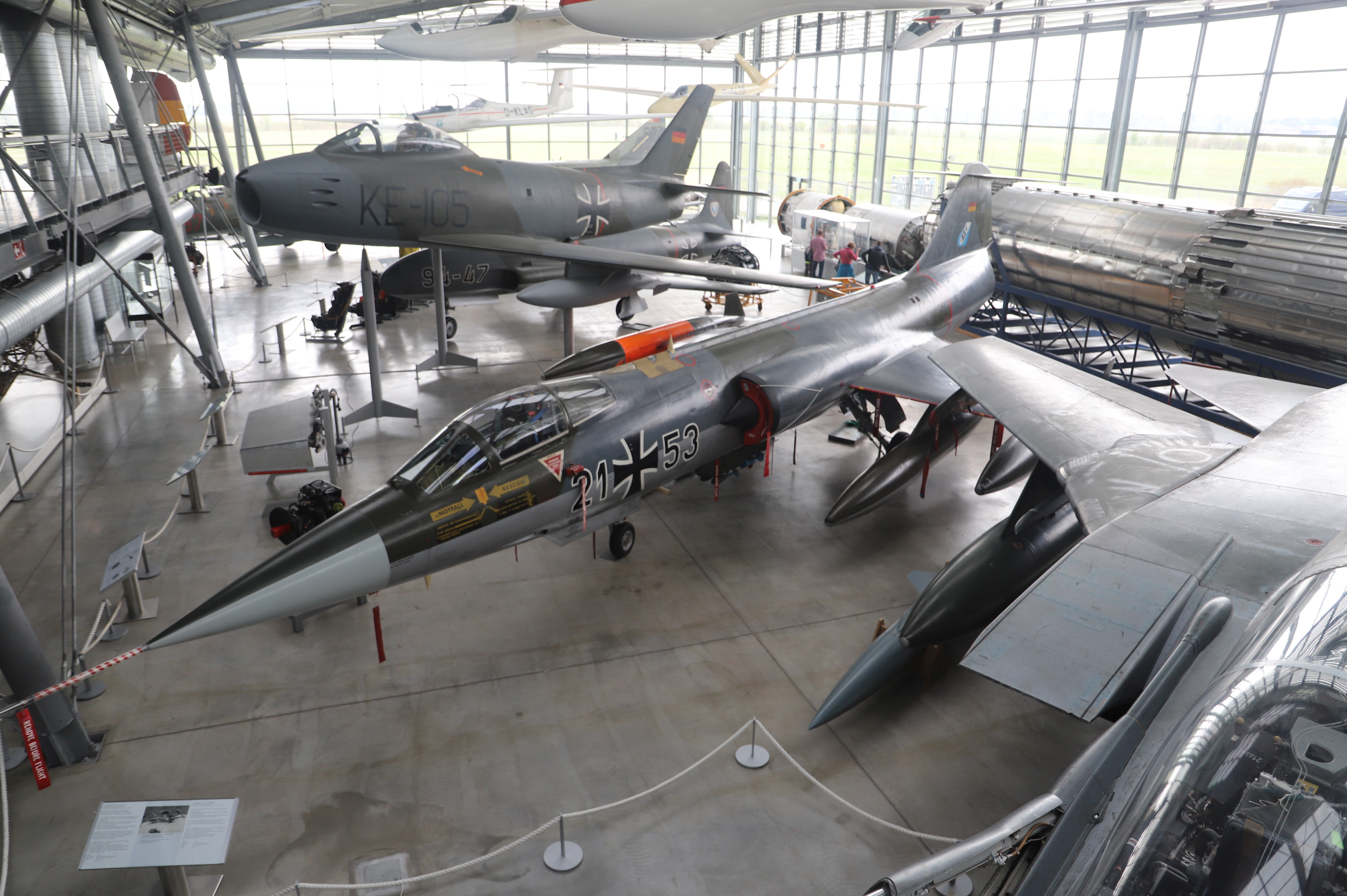
Cold War jet aircraft on display

- Canadair CL-13 B Sabre Mk.6
- Dornier Do 128-6 Turbo Skyservant
- Eurofighter EF-2000 DA 1
- Lockheed T-33A
- Lockheed F-104G Starfighter
- Mikoyan-Gurevich MiG-21 MF
- Panavia Tornado IDS
- Rockwell-MBB X-31
- Transall C-160
- VFW-Fokker 614

=== VTOL aircraft ===
List from Deutsches Museum Flugwerft Schleissheim.

- Dornier Do 31 E-3
- EWR VJ 101
- VFW-Fokker VAK 191B
- Dornier Aerodyne E1

=== Human-powered aircraft ===
- Rochelt Musculair 2

=== Gliders and motorgliders ===
List from Deutsches Museum Flugwerft Schleissheim.

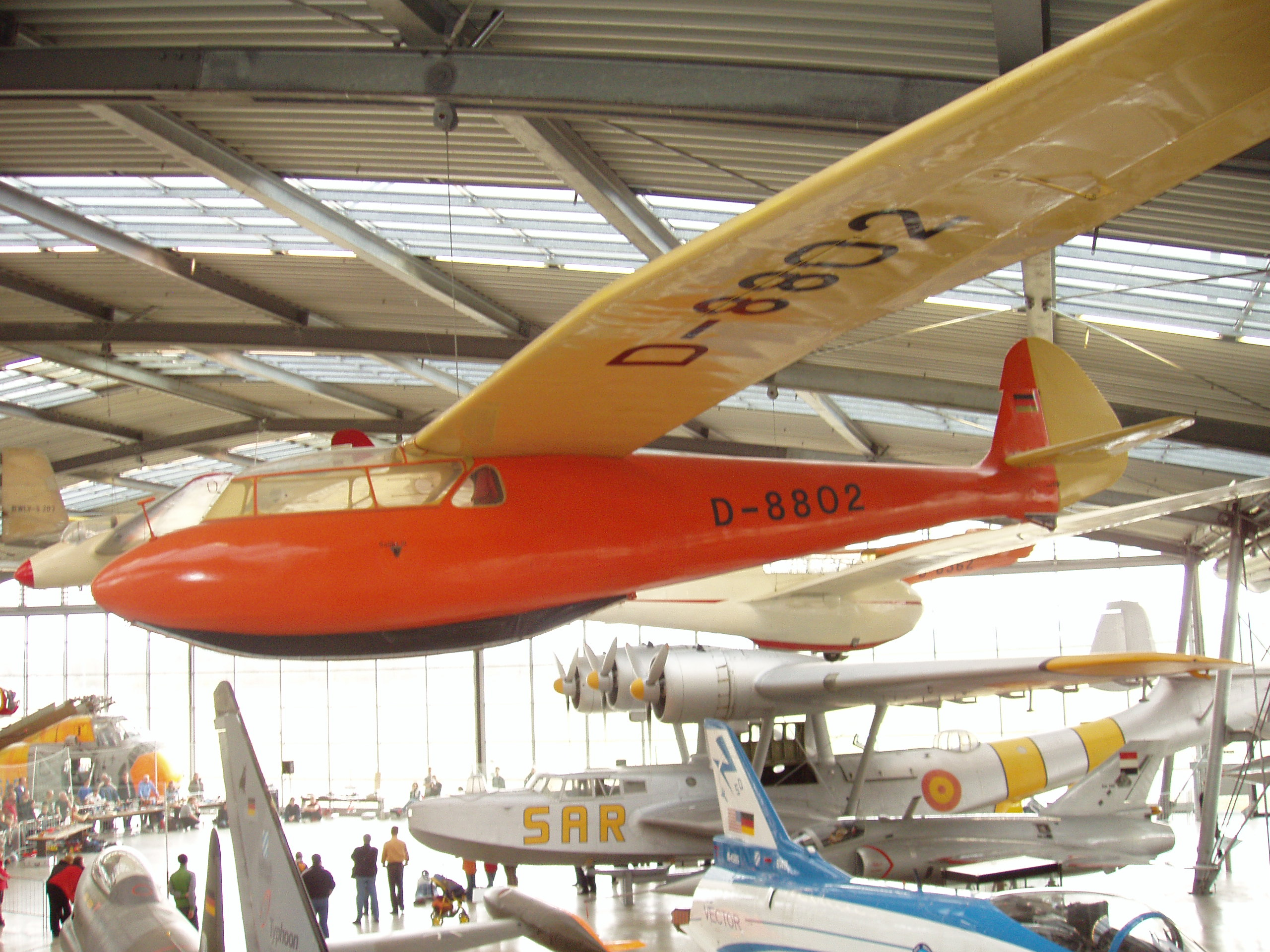
Condor IV, Dornier Do 24 T-3 seaplane in background

- Akaflieg Braunschweig SB-13 Arcus
- Akaflieg Karlsruhe AK-1
- Akaflieg München Mü10 Milan
- Akaflieg München Mü27
- Akaflieg Stuttgart FS-29
- Bölkow Phoebus C
- Condor IV
- DFS Kranich II
- DFS Olympia Meise
- Fauvel AV.36
- Goevier III
- Grunau Baby IIb
- HKS 3
- Horten H.IV
- Hütter Hü 17a
- Kaiser Ka 1
- Raab Krähe
- Rochelt Solair 1
- Scheibe Mü 13E Bergfalke I
- Schleicher Ka 6
- SG-38
- SZD-9 bis 1E Bocian
- Valentin Taifun 17E
- Wolfmüller glider

=== Hang gliders ===
List from Deutsches Museum Flugwerft Schleissheim.

- Flight Design Exxtacy
- Huber Alpengleiter
- Laser 12.8
- Lilienthal glider
- Pelzner hang glider
- Super Gryphon

=== Helicopters ===
List from Deutsches Museum Flugwerft Schleissheim.

- Bell UH-1D
- MBB Bo 105
- RHCI Mini-500
- Sikorsky S-58
- SNCASE S.E. 3130 Alouette II

== Rockets/spacecraft ==
List from Deutsches Museum Flugwerft Schleissheim.

- V-2 (Rocket motor)
- Europa rocket
- Ariane 5 (Booster)

== Aircraft engines ==
List from Deutsches Museum Flugwerft Schleissheim.

=== Piston engines ===
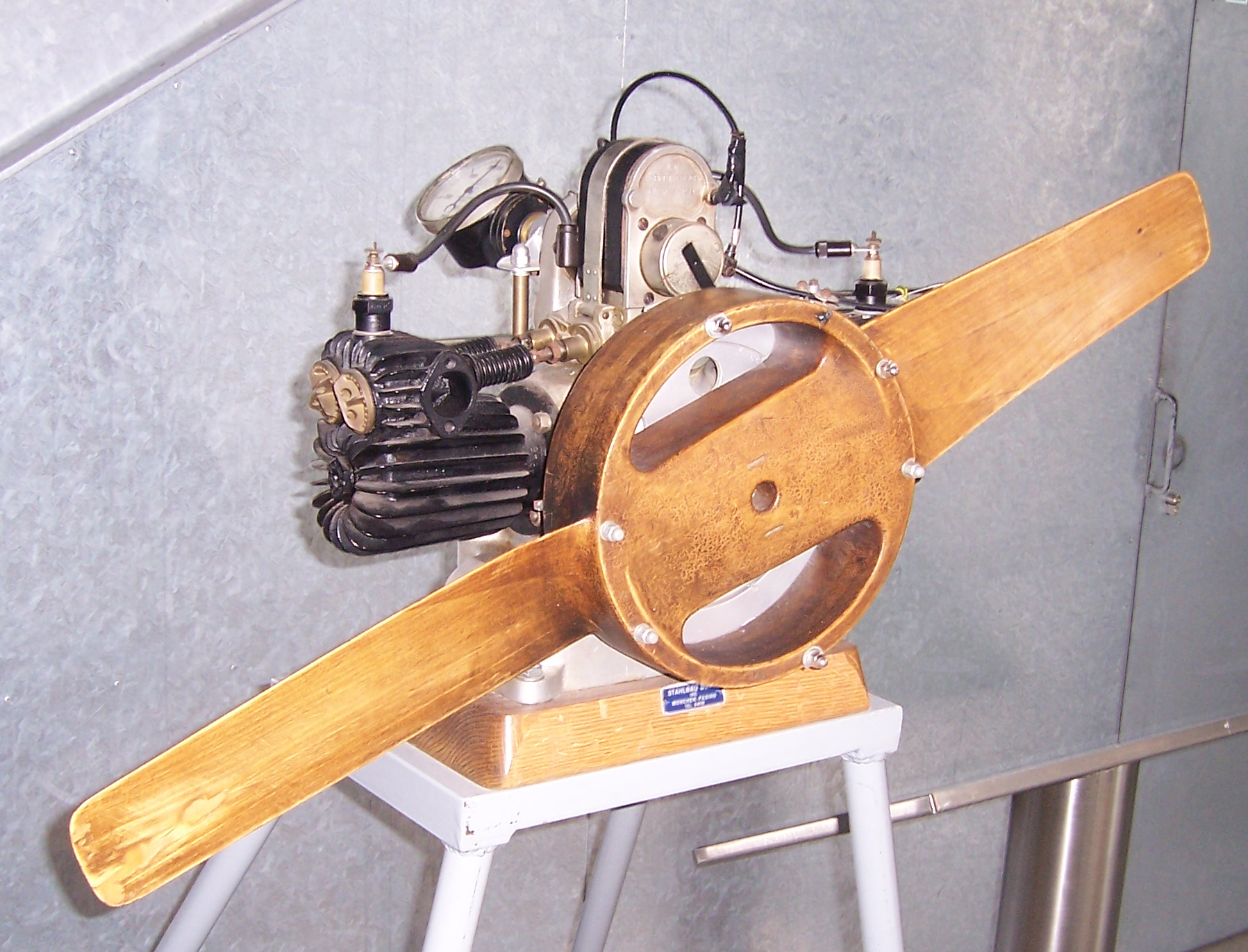
BMW M2 B15

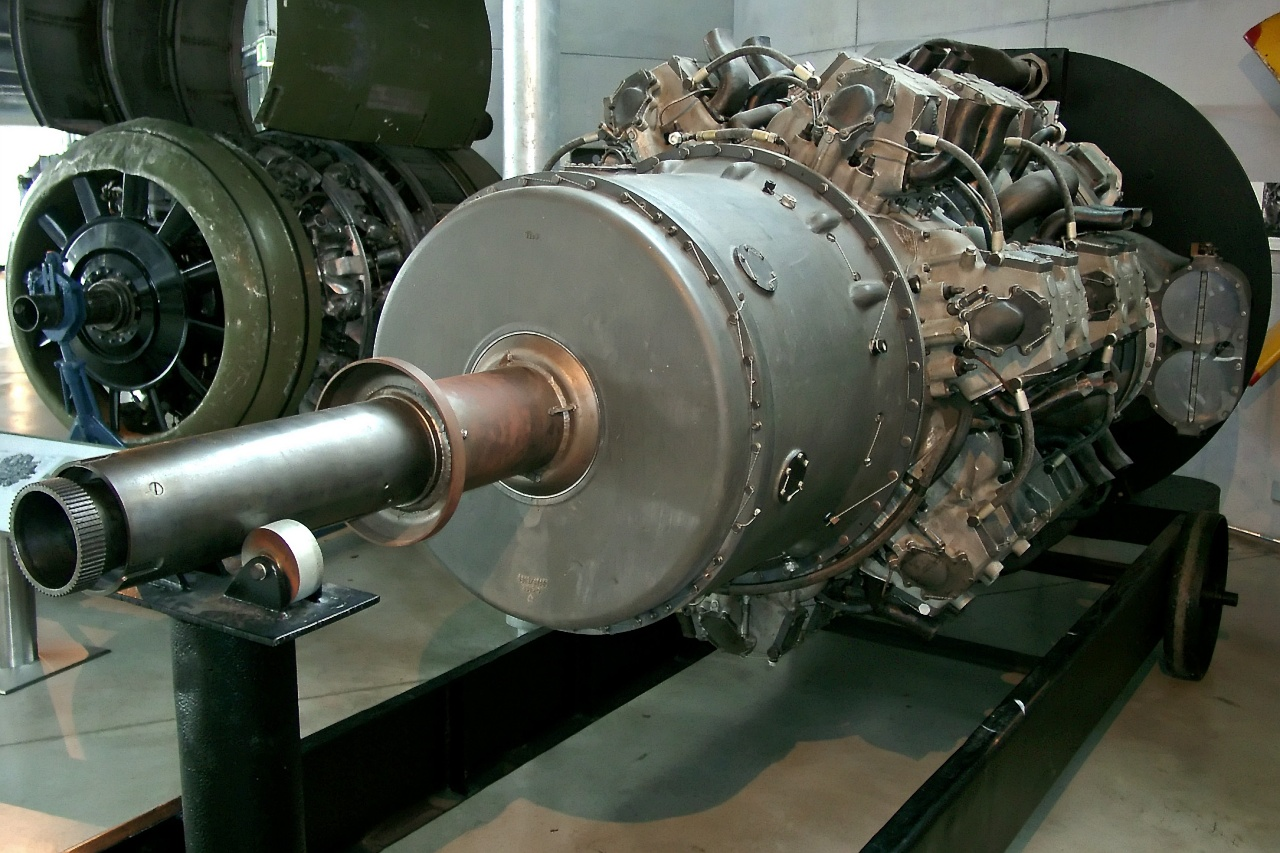
BMW 803

- Alvis Leonides
- Argus As 17a
- Argus Type 4
- BMW 132A
- BMW 801 TJ
- BMW 803
- BMW M2B15
- Daimler D.IV
- Daimler-Benz DB 601
- Daimler-Benz DB 610
- de Havilland Gipsy Major
- Farman 12We
- Haacke HFM 2
- Hirth HM 60
- Hirth HM 504
- Junkers L5
- Junkers Jumo 211F
- Körting 8 SL 116
- Lycoming GO-480
- Lycoming TIO-360
- Oberursel U.III
- Porsche PFM 3200
- Pratt & Whitney R-1830 Twin Wasp
- Pratt & Whitney R-1340 Wasp
- Rumpler Aeolus
- Salmson AD.3
- Walter Mikron 4-II
- Wright-Lawrance L4

=== Gas turbine engines ===
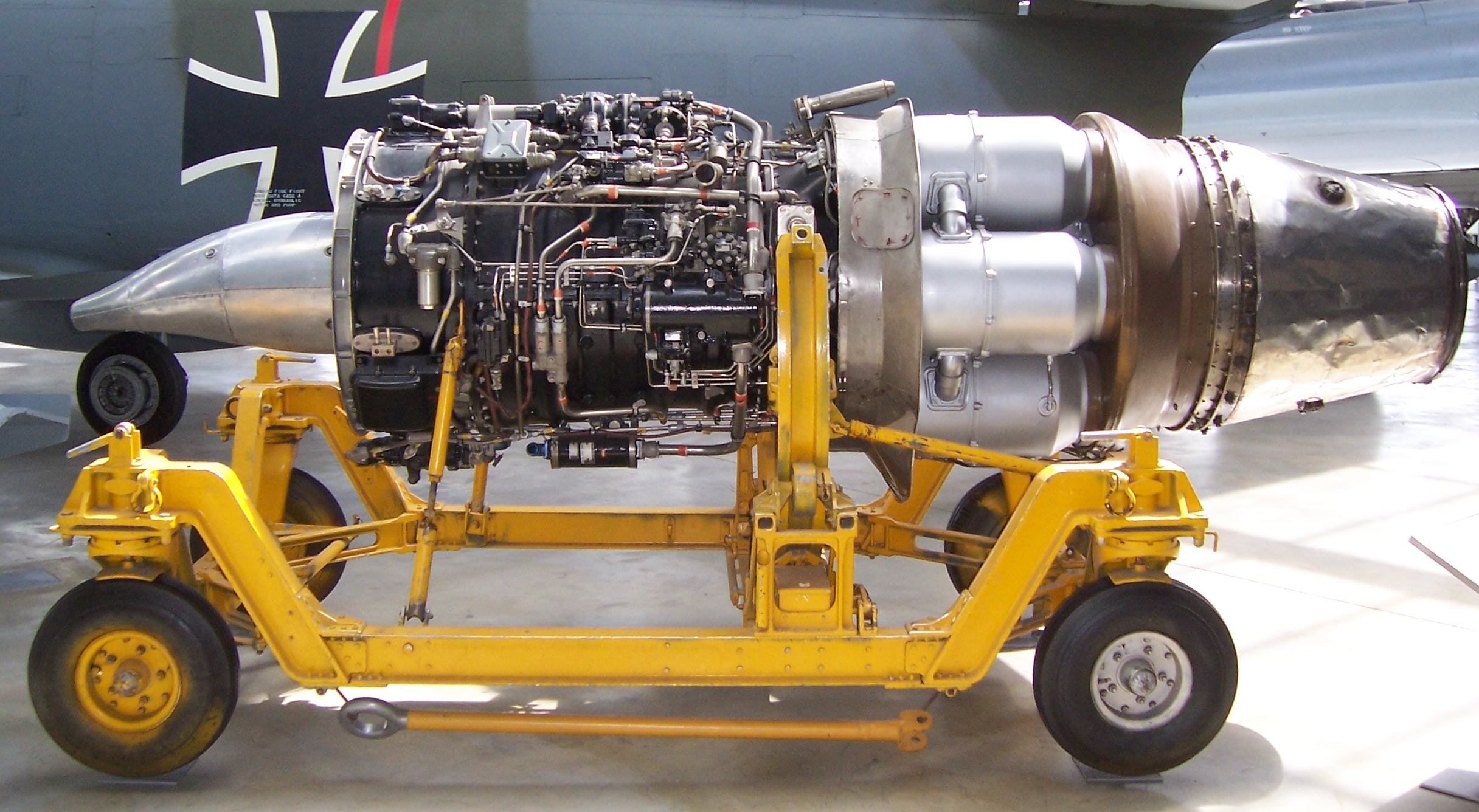
Avro Canada Orenda 14

- Allison 250
- Allison J33 A
- Armstrong Siddeley Double Mamba
- Avro Canada Orenda 14
- Bristol Orpheus 703
- General Electric J79
- Junkers Jumo 004
- Klimov RD-45
- Lycoming T53
- Rolls-Royce Pegasus
- Rolls-Royce RB162
- Rolls-Royce RB145R
- Rolls-Royce/MAN Turbo RB193
- Rolls-Royce/SNECMA M45H
- Tumansky R-29
- Turbo-Union RB199 (−101 and −104)
- Wright J65

== See also ==
- List of aerospace museums
