= Akaflieg Braunschweig SB-13 Arcus =

German single-seat glider, 1988

SB13 Arcus
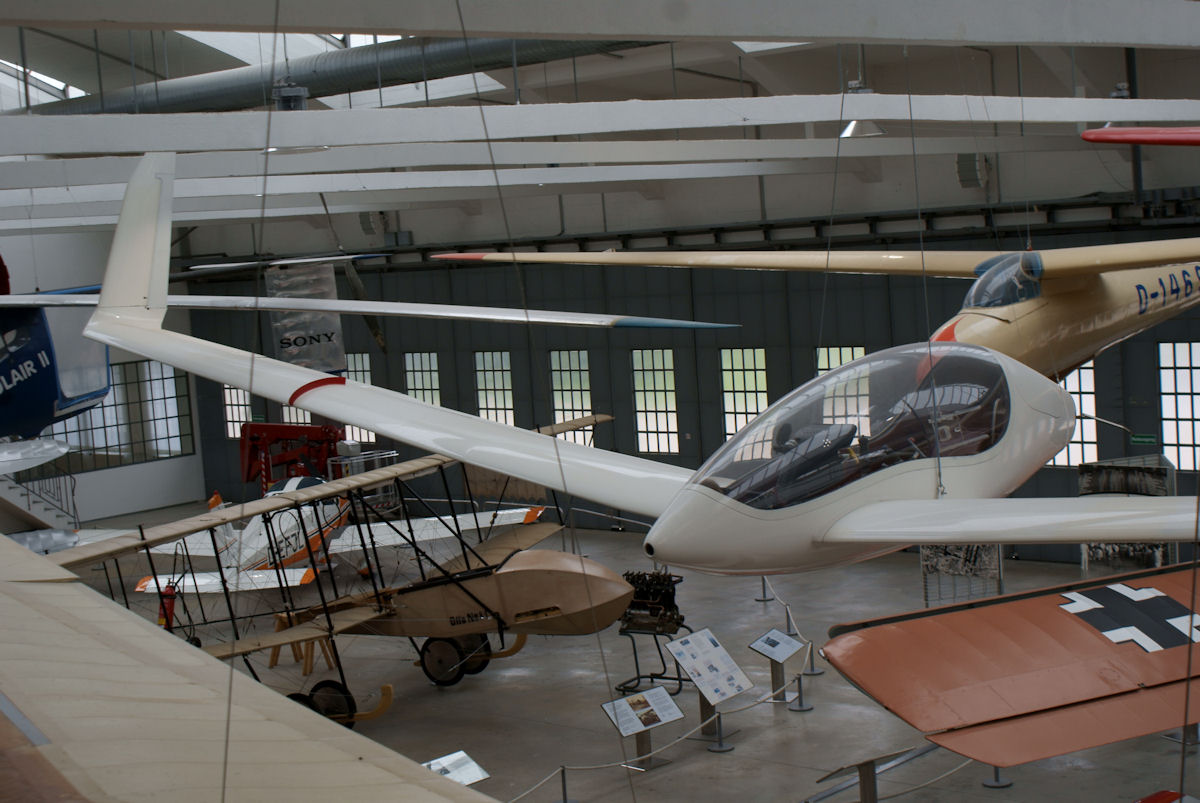
- SB-13 at the Deutsches Museum Flugwerft Schleissheim

General information
- Type: Single seat experimental glider
- National origin: Germany
- Number built: 1

History
- First flight: 18 March 1988
- Retired: 2000

The Akaflieg Braunschweig SB-13 Arcus was a single experimental tailless, single-seat, Standard Class glider designed and built in Germany in the early 1990s. Though it performed as well as its conventional contemporaries, it did not offer sufficiently improved performance to compensate for its difficult handling characteristics.

== Design and development ==
The Akaflieg Braunschweig or Akademische Fliegergruppe Braunschweig (English: The Brunswick Academic Flying Group) is one of some fourteen German undergraduate student flying groups attached to and supported by their home Technical University. Several have designed and built aircraft, often technically advanced and leading the development of gliders in particular. In 1982 when the SB-13 design was first discussed no new tailless glider had been built for thirty years, during which time glass reinforced plastic materials had replaced wood in glider construction and much learned about laminar flow wings; it was hoped that tailless designs would be lighter, simpler and cheaper.

Work on the SB-13 Arcus, named after the cloud formation, began in 1982. Because of the novelty of the layout, a one-third scale model of the early design was built and flown, revealing several serious problems. Strong flutter was experienced even at modest speed, and the aircraft was susceptible to the centre of gravity (c.g.) position. It stalled readily when this was too far aft. Recovery from the spin that followed was difficult. With the centre of gravity too far forward, a rapid longitudinal "pecking" oscillation set in, which was difficult to control due to its short duration. A major redesign involving extensive computer analysis led to a new wing with carbon fibre stiffening on the main spar; in addition, both it and the wing plan were made curved. The new structure resisted flutter until 270 km/h (168 mph) was reached.

The full-scale SB-13 finally flew in 1988. Its 15 m (49.2 ft) wing was straight-edged, with three slightly tapered sections of increasing sweep. The two inner panels occupied less than 1.9 m (6.2 ft) of the span, and the outer section leading edge was swept at about 17°. All had a dihedral of 4°. At its tips, where the chord was 600 mm (24 in), the wing turned upwards into 1,250 mm (49 in) tall, slightly swept winglets, which carried rudders. Elevons occupied much of the outer panel trailing edge and, further inboard, mid-chord mounted airbrakes were fitted. The fuselage, onto which the wings were mounted between low and mid position, was a short pod with its nose a little ahead of the centre section leading edge, extending aft about as far as the trailing horizontal edge of the wing at its tip. The pilot reclined under a long, bulged, single piece canopy, which was side-hinged to starboard. The cockpit reached beyond the wing both forward and aft, with the main spar passing through it under the pilot's knees.

Despite the modifications made to remove the handling problems predicted by the model, the full-scale SB-13 still "pecked" and spun readily; when the standard spin correction procedure was applied, a new spin started in the opposite direction. Over the next few years, several aerodynamic devices were tried, some of which at least improved the behaviour of the Arcus; one longer-lasting outcome from the project was the start of an investigation into whole aircraft rescue parachutes. The competition performance of the Arcus was on a par with that of the other 15 m gliders of the time, but it did not offer a significant improvement over them, which might have justified even more effort to improve the handling.

== Operational history ==
The sole SB-13 was flown, modified and studied from 1988 to 2000 when it was damaged and set aside in favour of newer aircraft. In 2007 it went to the Deutsches Museum, Munich for exhibition.

== Aircraft on display ==
- SB-13 D-1113 is on display in the Deutsches Museum Flugwerft Schleissheim.

== Specifications ==
Data from Sailplanes 1965-2000 (characteristics), Akaflieg Braunschweig website (performance), Jane's All the World's Aircraft 1988-89 (performance).

General characteristics

- Crew: 1
- Length: 3.02 m (9 ft 11 in) fuselage pod
- Wingspan: 15.0 m (49 ft 3 in)
- Height: 1.96 m (6 ft 5 in)
- Wing area: 11.64 m^{2} (125.3 sq ft)
- Aspect ratio: 19.4
- Airfoil: HQ 34N/14.83 at root, HQ 36N/15.12 at tip. Winglet Wortmann FX 7-L-150/K30.
- Empty weight: 258 kg (569 lb)
- Max takeoff weight: 418 kg (922 lb) with water ballast

Performance

- Stall speed: 70 km/h (43 mph, 38 kn)
- Never exceed speed: 210 km/h (130 mph, 110 kn) ::::170 km/h (110 mph; 92 kn) on aero-tow

150 km/h (93 mph; 81 kn) on winch launch

- g limits: +5.3, -2.65
- Maximum glide ratio: 42:1 at 107 km/h (67 mph; 58 kn)
- Rate of sink: 0.57 m/s (112 ft/min) minimum, at 85 km/h (53 mph; 46 kn)
- Wing loading: 36.1 kg/m^{2} (7.4 lb/sq ft) maximum
