= Rolls-Royce/MAN Turbo RB.153 =

1960s British/German turbofn aircraft engine project

RB.153
- Type: Turbofan
- Manufacturer: Rolls-Royce Limited; MAN Turbo
- First run: January 1963
- Major applications: EWR VJ 101D

The Rolls-Royce/MAN Turbo RB.153 was a high-performance 6,850 pounds-force (3,110 kgf) dry thrust turbofan engine developed jointly by Rolls-Royce Limited and MAN Turbo. Developed for the German EWR VJ 101D interceptor with a German-developed thrust-deflector system. The engine was also proposed for a number of other military VTOL projects including the Hawker P.1157 and Dornier Do 31. A commercial-version of the engine was also considered for the Messerschmitt Me P.160 airliner. The VJ101D project was cancelled and the engine never flew, being retained as a test bed.

== Applications ==
- EWR VJ 101D cancelled.

== Specifications ==
==== General characteristics ====
- Type: Turbofan
- Length: 89 inches (2.261 metres)
- Diameter: 29.5 inches (0.749 metres)
- Dry weight: 1431 lb (649 kg)

==== Components ====
- Compressor:

==== Performance ====
- Maximum thrust: 6,850 lbf (3,110 kgf) (30,470 N)
- Air mass flow: 121 lb/s (54.9 kg/s)
- Thrust-to-weight ratio: 4.79

== See also ==
- Rolls-Royce/MAN Turbo RB193

Related lists

- List of aircraft engines
