= Vereinigte Flugtechnische Werke =

West German aerospace manufacturer

VFW
- Industry: Aircraft manufacturer
- Predecessor: Focke-Wulf and Weser Flugzeugbau
- Founded: 1964; 61 years ago in Bremen, West Germany
- Defunct: 1981
- Fate: Acquired & Merged
- Successor: Messerschmitt-Bölkow-Blohm

Vereinigte Flugtechnische Werke (VFW; English: "United Aviation Engineering Works") was a West German aerospace manufacturer.

The company was formed by the 1964 merger of two German aerospace firms, Focke-Wulf and Weser Flugzeugbau GmbH (Weserflug). The formation of VFW was a natural outcome, as the two companies had been collaborating, along with Hamburger Flugzeugbau (HFB), in the rocket technology development alliance Entwicklungsring Nord (ERNO) group since 1961, the move was seen as a natural fit. Such collaborative efforts continued throughout VFW's operating years, not just through ERNO but also with the Dutch aircraft producer Fokker, who formed a joint venture with the firm, VFW-Fokker GmbH, during 1969 to promote.

Collaboration with Fokker waned substantially over the years, having been greatly soured by the poor results of the VFW 614 programme, resulting in VFW-Fokker GmbH being wound up in 1980. During 1981, VFW was acquired by its domestic rival, Messerschmitt-Bölkow-Blohm (MBB), and was largely integrated into it. Through various mergers and acquisitions, the present-day successor company to VFW is the multinational Airbus Group. The firm's space-based activities under ERNO has also been integrated into one of Airbus's operating divisions.

== History ==
=== Formation and the VFW 614 ===
During the early 1960s, the government of West Germany promoted the reorganisation and consolidation of its aircraft manufacturing sector; furthermore, as many of these companies were already collaborating on various programmes, such integration was a somewhat logical outcome. During 1964, two such companies, Focke-Wulf and Weser Flugzeugbau GmbH (Weserflug), opted to merge, the resulting combined entity that emerged being Vereinigte Flugtechnische Werke (VFW), based at Bremen, Germany.

A key programme undertaken by VFW was the VFW 614 short-haul airliner, which had been proposed prior to its formation by its predecessor companies. The basic design of this aircraft was heavily influenced by the pre-war American piston-engine Douglas DC-3 passenger aircraft. During 1968, having secured considerable financial backing from the West German Government, the programme was given the go-ahead. The VFW 614 was considerably shaped by technical assistance provided by the Dutch aircraft manufacturer Fokker; several early changes to the VFW 614's design, including the discarding of a T-tail in favour of a conventional unit, furnished with a low-set vertical stabilizer and dihedral, has been accredited to Fokker's input into the programme. By the time that full-scale production of the VFW 614 had been approved in 1970, VFW had opted to merge its fledgling commercial aircraft activities with those of Fokker, creating the joint venture company VFW-Fokker GmbH for this purpose; this entity has the distinction of being Europe's first transnational aircraft company.

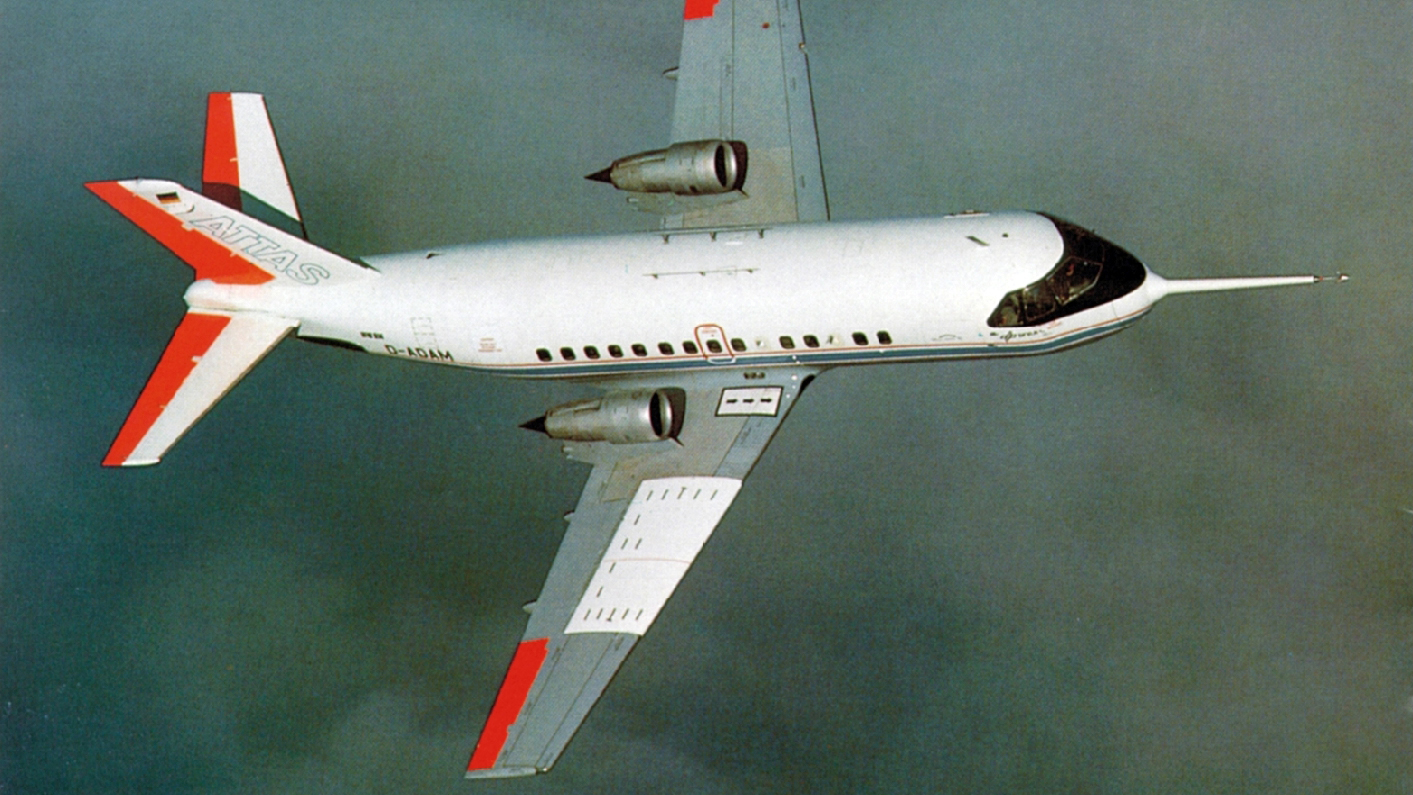
VFW 614 inflight from above

As envisioned, Fokker's established civil sales unit and support infrastructure was to be used to support the VFW 614 programme; however, the union has been regarded by some commentators as having been an 'unhappy arrangement'. The programme suffered several early blows, including the loss of the first prototype on 1 February 1972, which was attributed to an instance of elevator flutter. VFW had also taken the relatively bold decision to develop both an entirely new airframe and a new engine in parallel; the latter element being impacted by Rolls-Royce's bankruptcy in 1971, effectively threatening the supply of the only suitable engines for the airliner. By February 1975, only ten aircraft had been ordered. During April 1975, the first production VFW 614 made its first flight; it was delivered to Denmark's Cimber Air four months later.

However, perhaps the most major potential customer, West Germany's flagcarrier airline Lufthansa, declined to procure any VFW 614s; the company having prioritised the development of its long haul routes, for which the type was not applicable, while the German government had also declined to pressure the airline to purchase it. According to authors H. Dienel and P. Lyth, Lufthansa's lack of interest in the type was attributed as having been a major factor in the commercial failure of the VFW 614. According to author Mark E. Mendenhall, the management within VFW-Fokker was divided and split along national lines; while a number of German figures within the company attributed the poor sales performance to the Dutch sales team having paid the type little heed, even allegedly regarding it as a competitor to Fokker's established product lines for orders, and that salesmen had prioritised the promotion of Dutch-designed airliners instead. Reportedly, some Dutch managers did hold a preference for their own aircraft, regarding them as established successes and the VFW 614 as a waste of effort to market; furthermore, Dutch management was alleged by Mendenhall to have interfered with the firm's marketing structure to curtail independence and maintain support for their own aircraft.

=== Other activities ===
At the time of VFW's formation, the company's management was heavy interested in developing its own VTOL strike aircraft. Around this era, multiple companies had been working on their own conceptual designs for VTOL-capable interceptor aircraft; in order for these designs to be operationally relevant and viable, it was recognised that it would be necessary for the flight performance to equal that of conventional interceptors of the era, such as the contemporary Lockheed F-104G Starfighter. Over time, two separate and distinct requirements emerged, one calling for a VTOL-capable successor to the F-104G interceptor while the other sought a VTOL successor to the Italian Fiat G.91 ground-attack fighter. According to aerospace publication Flight International, this call for a Fiat G.91 replacement, which came under a NATO requirement, known as NBMR-3, was a crucial trigger and greatly influenced the development programme that would lead to VFW's VTOL effort, designated as the VAK 191B.

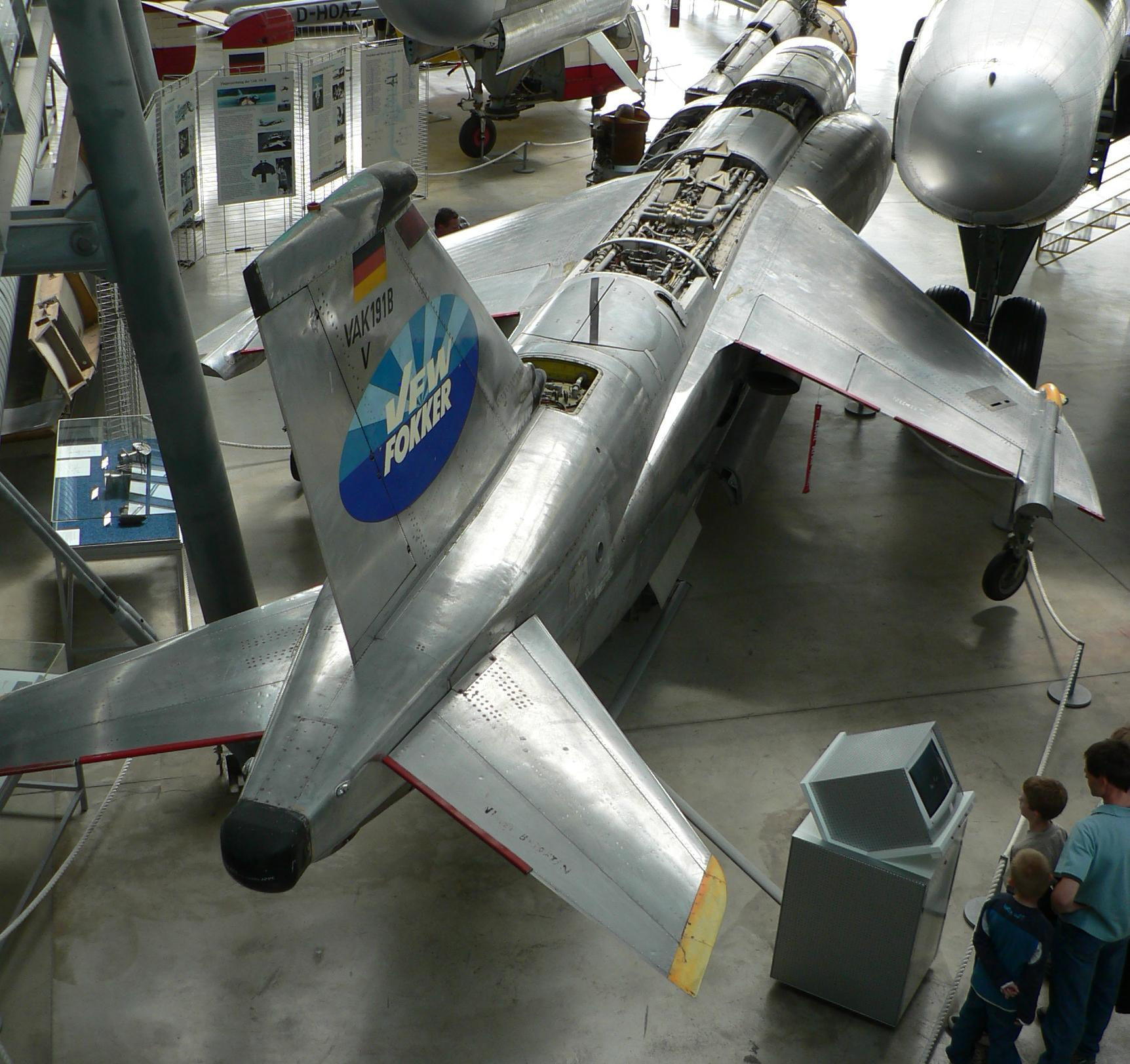
VAK 191B from above

Initially, Italian aircraft manufacturer Fiat was also a participating company in VFW, however, Italy later chose to withdraw from the joint development agreement with Germany during 1967. Despite this decision, Fiat remained as a major sub-contractor for the venture, being responsible for the production of various structural elements such as wings, tailplanes and some of the fuselage. However, even prior to the first flight of the type, the programme had been heavily affected by political changes. Amongst these were the effective irrelevance of the original NBRM-3 requirement and the decreasing importance of the strike mission as a result of a German government decision to abandon the nuclear role, a divergence of opinion between partner countries, the withdrawal of the Italian government from participation during August 1967, and a growing awareness of the programme's escalating costs. At one stage, the Italian government had agreed to take on 40 per cent of the programme's development costs, thus their departure meant that a substantial amount of funding was lost for the venture.

The emergence of a new German/American "Advanced Vertical Strike" (AVS) programme also diminished the type's perceived value; the prospective aircraft which was on offer from the Americans via a cooperative venture with Germany somewhat eclipsed the VAK 191B in the eyes of the German Air Force and served to effectively undermine support for the programme. During 1968, VFW decided that the VAK 191B should be reclassified as an experimental programme, and that the aircraft should principally function only as a technology demonstrator. The initial programme had called for the construction of three single-seater and three two-seater aircraft; however, amid escalating costs, this intended test batch was first converted to become six single-seat aircraft, and was later on cut down to only involve three single-seat aircraft following Italy's withdrawal.

Likely the most impactful and successor programme that VFW was involved in was the Transall C-160 military transport aircraft. It was developed and manufactured by a consortium, Transporter-Allianz or Transall, which had been formed in January 1959 between the French company Nord Aviation and the German companies Weser Flugzeugbau (which later merged into VFW) and Hamburger Flugzeugbau (HFB) to design and build the new transport. A single prototype was built by each of the production partners, with the first (built by Nord) flying on 25 May 1963, with the VFW and HFB-built prototypes following on 25 May 1963 and 19 February 1964. These were followed by six pre-production examples, stretched by 51 centimetres (20 in) compared with the prototypes, which flew between 1965 and 1966.

On 24 September 1964, a sizable contract for a total of 160 C-160s was signed, comprising 110 for Germany and 50 for France. Manufacturing work was split between Germany and France in line with the number of orders placed; Nord built the wings and engine nacelles, VFW the centre fuselage and horizontal tail, and HFB the forward and rear fuselage. The aircraft's tail fin was also built by Dornier. Three separate production lines were established to assemble these components at each of the three main partners. The first production airframes were delivered to France and Germany from 1967. The first batch included 110 C-160Ds for the German Air Force (Luftwaffe), 50 C-160Fs for the French Air Force, and nine C-160Zs for the South African Air Force. Four C-160Fs were converted to C-160P air mail transport aircraft, and were operated by Air France. Production continued until October 1972. Production of the type persisted throughout VFW's existence, and for several years further through its successors.

=== Fate ===
During 1981, VFW was acquired by, and subsequently integrated into, the German aerospace company Messerschmitt-Bölkow-Blohm (MBB), which in its turn was taken over by Deutsche Aerospace AG (DASA) in 1989. In July 2000, DASA, at this point named DaimerChrysler Aerospace AG, merged with the French aerospace company Aerospatiale-Matra and the Spanish aircraft manufacturer CASA to form European Aeronautic Defence and Space Company (EADS), which rebranded itself as the multinational Airbus Group in 2015.

Into the twenty-first century, the Entwicklungsring Nord (ERNO)/VFW descendant has continued to be active as the space infrastructure division of Airbus's Astrium business unit. Amongst its activities, the company has contributed various components of both the European Ariane space launch system and the International Space Station. During June 2003, this unit became part of EADS SPACE Transportation.

== Products ==
- VFW SG 1262 Schwebegestell
- VFW VAK 191B
- VFW-614
- VFW H-3
- Transall C-160
