= Transall =

Consortium to design military aircraft

- Type: Consortium
- Industry: Aerospace
- Founded: January 1959
- Area served: Worldwide
- Products: Aircraft
- Owners: Nord Aviation, Weser Flugzeugbau (VFW) and Hamburger Flugzeugbau (HFB)

Transall (Transport Allianz) was a consortium created to design and manufacture the Transall C-160 military transport aircraft.

Established in 1959, the company was initially a joint venture between Nord Aviation of France and Weser Flugzeugbau (WFB) and Hamburger Flugzeugbau (HFB) of Germany. It was later operated by French aerospace company Aérospatiale and German aircraft manufacturers Vereinigte Flugtechnische Werke (VFW) and Messerschmitt-Bölkow-Blohm (MBB). Production of its sole product, the C-160, was terminated in 1985. The three later companies merged to form the multinational aerospace company EADS, which subsequently rebranded itself the Airbus Group.

== History ==
During the late 1950s, a requirement arose to replace the piston-engined Nord Noratlas transports operated by the French Air Force and the German Air Force. In the postwar era, many politicians in both countries were keen to encourage industrial co-operation between France and Germany; examples of this had already occurred in the aircraft manufacturing sector, such as a previous arrangement in which Noratlases for the German Air Force had been produced under license by German aircraft manufacturer Weser Flugzeugbau. On 28 November 1957, representatives from both France and Germany signed an agreement calling for the joint development of a successor to the Noratlas. The Italian government also became involved in the project early on to meet their own air force's requirements; however, Italy's participation in the fledgling program was soon terminated in favour of the smaller and locally-built Fiat G.222 instead.

In January 1959, a consortium, named the "Transporter-Allianz" or Transall, was formally established to develop and produce this new transport aircraft; its initial membership comprised the French aircraft manufacturer Nord Aviation and the German companies Weser Flugzeugbau (which became Vereinigte Flugtechnische Werke (VFW) in 1964) and Hamburger Flugzeugbau (HFB). Each of the production partners was responsible for the construction of a single prototype; the first (built by Nord) performed its maiden flight on 25 May 1963, while the VFW and HFB-built prototypes followed on 25 May 1963 and 19 February 1964 respectively. These prototypes were followed by six pre-production examples, which made their first flights between 1965 and 1966; these aircraft were stretched by 51 centimetres (20 in) compared with the prototypes.

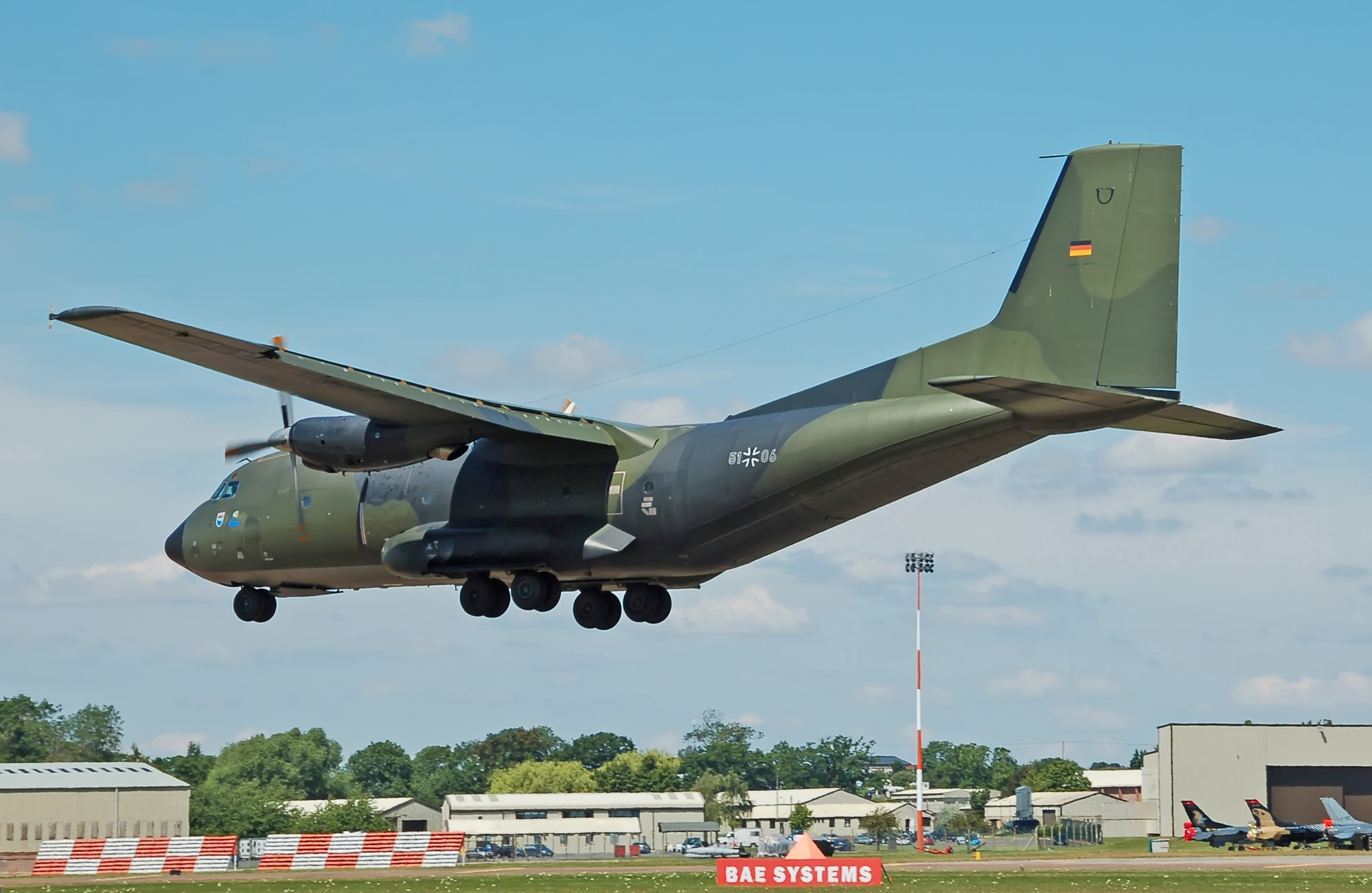
A German Air Force Transall C-160D arriving at RAF Fairford, Gloucestershire, England, on 10 July 2014, for the Royal International Air Tattoo

Production orders were delayed by the unsuccessful efforts of American defence company Lockheed to sell its C-130 Hercules transport to the German Air Force as an alternative to the C-160. On 24 September 1964, a formal production contract was signed, ordered a combined lot of 160 C-160s (110 for Germany and 50 for France). Workshare on the type's manufacture was divided between Germany and France broadly in line with the number of orders placed. While Nord produced both the wings and engine nacelles, VFW manufactured the centre fuselage and horizontal tail, and HFB constructed the forward and rear fuselage; the aircraft's tail fin was also built by Dornier. Three separate assembly lines were established, where the sections produced by each of the three main partner companies were brought together to form complete aircraft.

During 1967, the first production airframes were delivered to France and Germany. The first batch included 110 C-160Ds for the German Air Force (Luftwaffe), 50 C-160Fs for the French Air Force, and nine C-160Zs for the South African Air Force. Four C-160Fs were subsequently converted to the C-160P air mail transport aircraft configuration, and were operated by the national flag carrier Air France on behalf of the French Postal Service. Production continued until October 1972.

In July 1977, France placed an order for 25 C-160 aircraft, which were built to an improved standard. Production work for this batch was split 50–50 between French aerospace company Aérospatiale (the successor to Nord) and Germany aviation firm Messerschmitt-Bölkow-Blohm (MBB) (which had absorbed VFW and HFB), while all aircraft were completed at a single assembly line in Toulouse. Changes from earlier aircraft include the cargo loading door on the port side of the fuselage being replaced by provision for additional fuel tanks in the wing centre section, as well as the installation of updated and improved avionics. During 1981, the first of these second generation C-160s made its first flight. Aircraft produced in this batch included 29 for France (an additional four non-standard aircraft were constructed for special missions), and six for Indonesia.

== Product ==
- Transall C-160
- Transall 161 - Not Built

== See also ==
- List of aircraft manufacturers
