= VFW-Fokker =

1969–1980 West German aircraft manufacturer

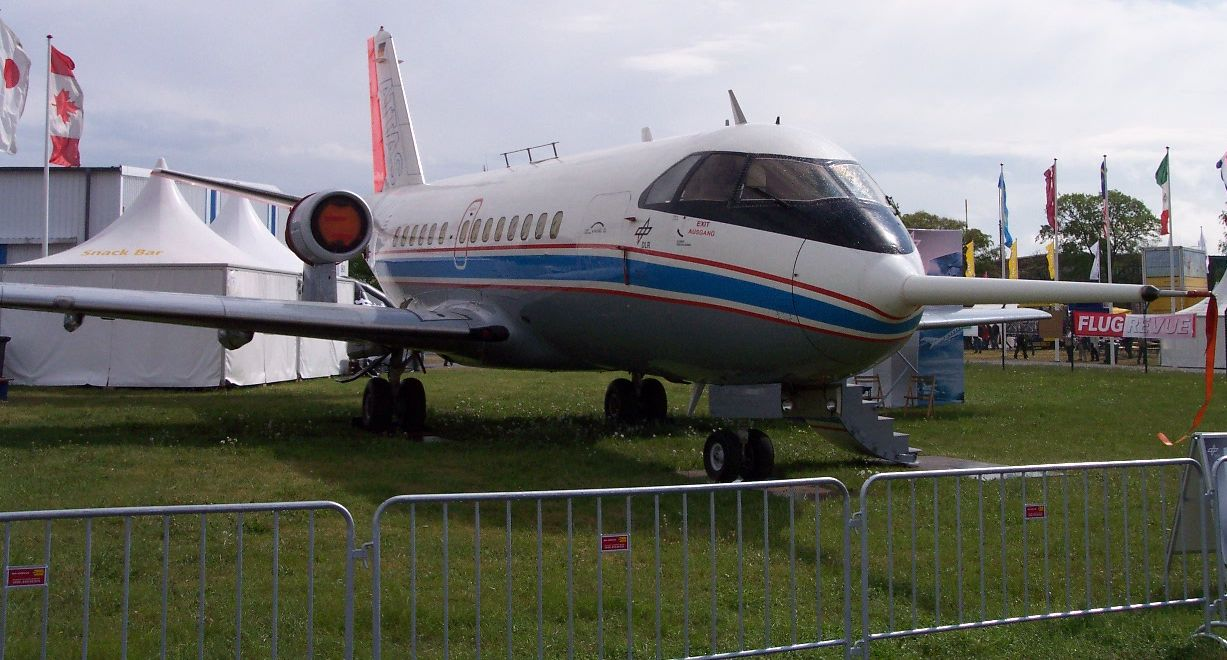
The VFW 614 used by the DLR for ATTAS in the 1990s

VFW-Fokker GmbH was a joint venture of Fokker and Vereinigte Flugtechnische Werke (VFW) started in 1969 that, from then on, controlled the ERNO initiative.

The Entwicklungsring Nord (Northern development circle) — abbreviated ERNO — was a 1961 joint venture of Bremen-based Weserflug and Focke-Wulf with Hamburger Flugzeugbau to develop parts for rockets and get involved in space activities.

Gerhard Eggers (1912-1998) served as managing director for development and was instrumental in the VFW 614 project.

== VFW-Fokker 614 ==
In 1961 work began on a small, jet-powered transport aircraft initially styled Erno-61-4. After Weserflug and Focke Wulf formally merged into Vereinigte Flugtechnische Werke (VFW) in 1964, the machine was redesignated VFW 614. The draft design was amended to a STOL 40-44 passenger jet with overwing engines, for easier operation from unprepared runways. German government subsidies enabled development to start in earnest in 1966. The first prototype started in August 1968, but then VFW and Fokker of the Netherlands formed a joint transnational holding company.

The prototype flew on July 14, 1971, but crashed next February. Two more prototypes flew in 1972. German, FAA, and French DGA certifications completed in 1974, 1975, and 1976 respectively. The collaborative production arrangements involved Messerschmitt-Bölkow-Blohm (MBB) in Germany, VFW-Fokker in the Netherlands and SABCA and Fairey in Belgium. The first sale was to Cimber Air, which started commercial flights in November 1975.

The VFW-Fokker alliance affected the VFW 614 negatively, as Fokker needed to sell its competing F27 and F28. National subsidies were diverted to the Airbus program, and the end came for the VFW-614. On August 19, 1977, the nineteenth (including prototypes) and last machine was completed.

Few VFW 614 aircraft remained in use. Only the Koln/Bonn Flugbereitschaft der Luftwaffe continued flying VFW 614 until they finally ceased in 1998. The last flying example of the aircraft was retired in 2012 as a research bed.

== Other developments ==
VFW-Fokker teamed with Republic Aviation to develop the D-24 Alliance Variable sweep wing VTOL aircraft as part of the AVS ("Advanced Vertical Strike").

The European Space Agency ESA in June 1974 named a consortium headed by ERNO-VFW Fokker (Zentralgesellschaft VFW-Fokker GmbH) to build pressurized modules for Spacelab. British Aerospace, under contract to ERNO-VFW Fokker, built five 10 ft (3.0 m)-long, unpressurized, U-shaped pallet segments.

West Germany provided 53.3% of Spacelab's cost and fulfilled 52.6% of all Spacelab work contracts. ERNO VFW Fokker, in competition with MBB, submitted the winning design, and became the prime contractor for Spacelab. MBB in 1981 took over VFW Fokker. The ERNO plant in Bremen continued as the headquarters for Spacelab design, production management, component testing, and assembly. Today, it is a part of EADS Astrium Space Transportation.
