= Entwicklungsring Nord =

Former German company in rocket and space activities

The Entwicklungsring Nord (Northern development circle) - abbreviated ERNO - was a 1961 joint venture of Bremen-based Weserflug and Focke-Wulf with Hamburger Flugzeugbau to develop parts for rockets and get involved in space activities.

== Jet-powered aircraft VFW 614 ==
In 1961 work began on a small, jet-powered aircraft initially styled Erno-61-4. After Weserflug and Focke Wulf formally merged into Vereinigte Flugtechnische Werke (VFW) in 1964, the machine was redesignated VFW 614. The draft design was amended to a STOL 40-44 passenger jet with overwing engines, for easier operation from unprepared runways. German government subsidies enabled development to start in earnest in 1966. The first prototype started in August 1968, but then VFW and Fokker of the Netherlands formed a joint transnational holding company.

The prototype flew on 14 July 1971 but crashed next February. Two more prototypes flew in 1972. German, FAA, and French DGA certifications completed in 1974, 1975, & 1976 respectively. The collaborative production arrangements involved Messerschmitt-Bölkow-Blohm (MBB) in Germany, VFW-Fokker in the Netherlands and SABCA and Avions Fairey in Belgium. The first sale was to Cimber Air, which started commercial flights in November 1975.

The VFW-Fokker alliance affected the VFW 614 negatively, as Fokker needed to sell its competing F27 and F28. National subsidies were diverted to the Airbus program, and the end came for the VFW 614. On 19 August 1977 the nineteenth (including prototypes) and last machine was completed.

Few VFW 614 aircraft remained in use: The German Luftwaffe (Koln/Bonn Flugbereitschaft) continued flying VFW 614 until they finally ceased in 1998. The Luftwaffe machines went on to serve EADS/Airbus at Bremen (one aircraft for fly-by-wire development for the A380), and DLR in Braunschweig for development and research duties – the final flight of the last airworthy VFW 614 was on 7 December 2012.

== Space activities ==
=== Helios, TD ===
ERNO participated in several satellite programs mostly being responsible for structure and thermal control, propulsion. A mechanically very challenging item (i.e. the antenna of the German satellite HELIOS) was manufactured by ERNO.

=== Spacelab ===
The European Space Agency ESA in June 1974 named a consortium headed by ERNO-VFW Fokker (Zentralgesellschaft VFW-Fokker GmbH) to build pressurized modules called Spacelab. British Aerospace, under contract to ERNO-VFW Fokker, built five 10-foot (3.0 m)-long, unpressurized, U-shaped pallet segments.

West Germany provided 53.3% of Spacelab's cost and fulfilled 52.6% of all Spacelab work contracts. ERNO VFW Fokker, in competition with MBB, submitted the winning design, and became the prime contractor for Spacelab. MBB in 1981 took over VFW Fokker. The ERNO plant in Bremen continued as the headquarters for Spacelab design, production management, component testing, and assembly.

=== COLUMBUS ===
The Bremen team of the new MBB-ERNO prepared the first COLUMBUS proposal as Prime Contractor based on the experiences gained on Spacelab. As next step MBB-ERNO became a section of Daimler-Benz called DASA (Daimler-Benz Aerospace). Following it became a part of EADS Astrium Space Transportation, then Airbus Defence and Space. The engineering team for crewed space developments is responsible for Columbus operations and maintenance and involved in the development of NASA's Orion program.

The Bremen launcher team was split off and integrated in Airbus Safran Launchers part of ArianeGroup.

== Products ==
- Forschungsflugkörper sounding rocket
