= VFW-Fokker 614 =

1970s West German twinjet regional airliner

VFW 614
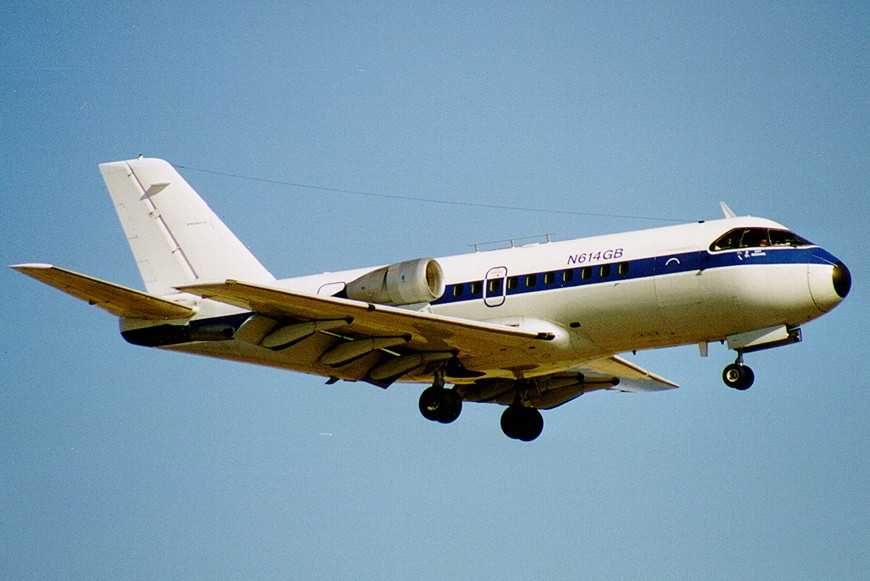
- Muk Air VFW-614

General information
- Type: Regional airliner
- Manufacturer: VFW-Fokker
- Status: Retired
- Primary users: German Air Force Touraine Air Transport; Air Alsace; Cimber Air
- Number built: 19

History
- Introduction date: August 1975
- First flight: 14 July 1971
- Retired: 7 December 2012

The VFW-Fokker 614 (also VFW 614) was a twin-engined jetliner designed and constructed by joint Dutch and West German aviation company VFW-Fokker. It is the first jet-powered passenger liner to be developed and produced in West Germany (the East German Baade 152 being the first German jet airliner), as well as the first German-built civil aircraft to have been manufactured for a decade.

The VFW 614 was originally proposed during the early 1960s as the E.614, which was a concept for a 36–40 seat aircraft by a consortium of West German aircraft companies, who were soon re-organised into Vereinigte Flugtechnische Werke (VFW). Originally intended as a Douglas DC-3 replacement, its most distinctive feature was that its engines were mounted in pods on pylons above the wing. The VFW 614 was produced in small numbers during the early- to mid-1970s by VFW-Fokker, a company resulting from a merger between VFW and the Dutch aircraft company Fokker. The program was cancelled in 1977, since anticipated sales and thus production were not achieved.

== Development ==
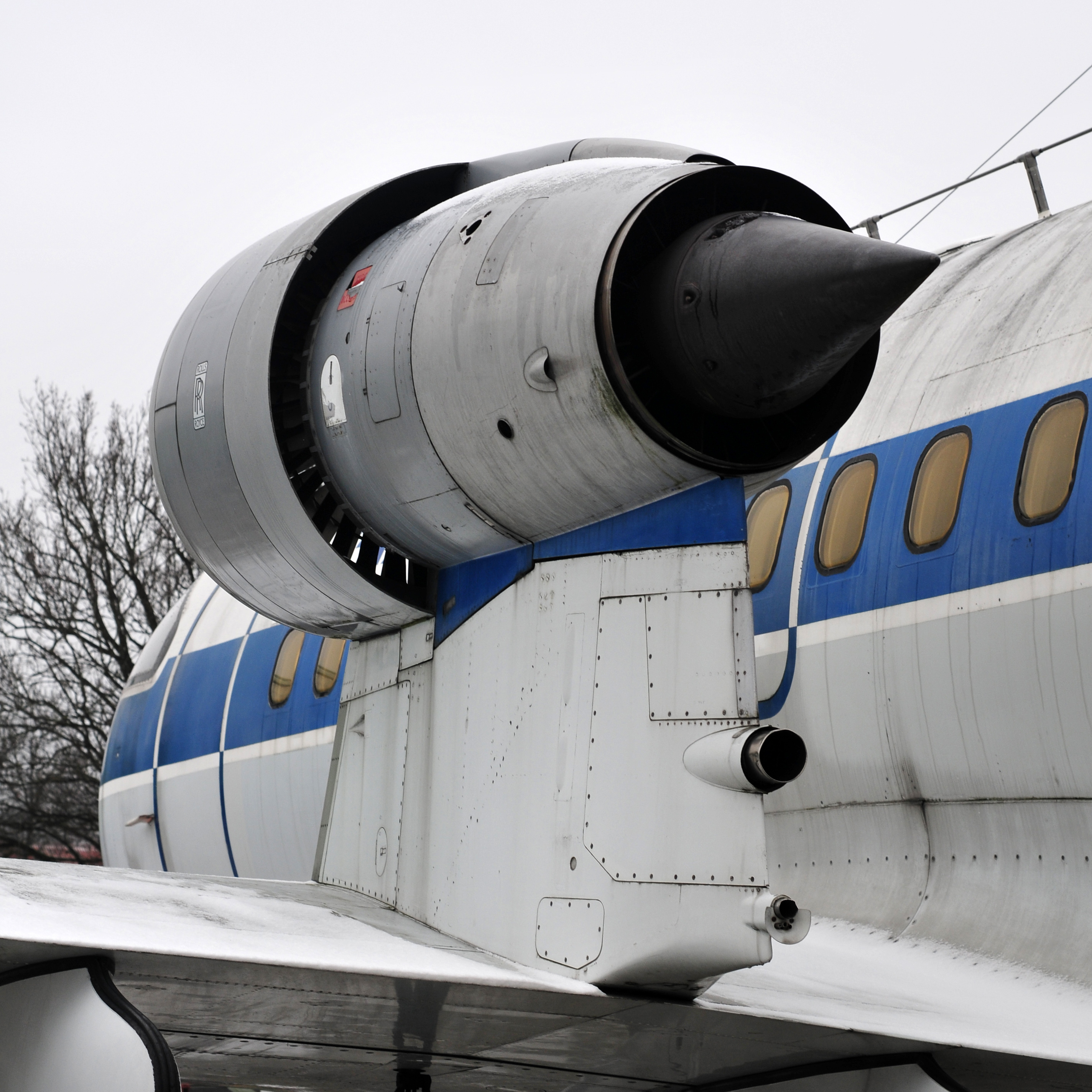
Overwing pylon-mounted Rolls-Royce/SNECMA M45H

The VFW 614 was originally proposed in 1961 by the Entwicklungsring Nord (ERNO) group, comprising Focke-Wulf, Hamburger Flugzeugbau (HFB) and Weser as the E.614, a 36–40 seat aircraft powered by a pair of American-built Lycoming PLF1B-2 turbofan engines. During this time, the West German industry underwent a substantial reorganisation, resulting in the establishment of Vereinigte Flugtechnische Werke (VFW), based at Bremen, Germany. Development of what would become the VFW 614 proceeded under the new combined company.

Lycoming ultimately chose to abandon development of the PLF1, which led to development of the type continuing using an alternative powerplant, the Rolls-Royce/SNECMA M45H turbofan engine, in its place. Unlike the PLF1, the M45H was developed specially to power the VFW 614. At the time, it was considered to have been a relatively bold ambition to develop both an entirely new airframe and a new engine in parallel. Throughout development, a major priority placed upon the engines was upon noise reduction, so as to allow the airliner to use small municipal airports without incurring noise abatement restrictions upon its operations.

In 1968, the project was given the go-ahead; at this point, 80 percent of the secured backing for the type originated from the West German Government. During 1970, full-scale production of the VFW 614 was approved, by which time VFW had merged with Dutch aircraft manufacturer Fokker, a move which had the distinction of being Europe's first transnational aircraft company. Aerospace publication Flying Magazine accredits Fokker's involvement in the project with several refinements and changes to the emerging design of the VFW 614, which included the discarding of a T-tail in favour of a conventional unit, furnished with a low-set vertical stabilizer and dihedral.

During this time, Fokker sought to broaden its financial basis and determined that the VFW 614 had promise; as such, the company intended to market the type through Fokker's established civil sales unit and support infrastructure; however, the union has been regarded by some commentators as having been an 'unhappy arrangement' and had only lasted for only ten years before its dissolution. In addition, several risk sharing agreements had been concluded with other aviation companies, including Siebel Flugzeugwerke ATG (SIAT) in Germany, Fairey and SABCA in Belgium and Shorts in the United Kingdom. Final assembly of the aircraft was to be performed at VFW's Bremen facility.

Development of the aircraft had been heavily influenced by the pre-war American piston-engine Douglas DC-3 passenger aircraft. During late 1971, it was reported that the company had anticipated overall sales of the VFW 614 airliner to reach between 300 and 400 units, which was to have included its use by various American operators.

On 14 July 1971, the first of three prototypes performed its maiden flight. The first flight of the aircraft was also the first time that the engine had been airborne, having not been previously flown on a test-bed. To speed up flight testing, the first and second prototypes, which were reportedly almost identical, were dispatched to Spain for three months of comprehensive trials to evaluate their performance under 'hot and high' conditions. Shortly after the accumulation of 800 flying hours, the design was frozen for production and manufacturing activity commenced on the first ten production airliners.

Development of the aircraft was protracted and orders slow to materialise, despite a strong marketing campaign. The situation was not helped by Rolls-Royce's bankruptcy in 1971 which threatened the supply of engines. According to aircraft publication Flight International, by 1974 the performance guarantees on both the thrust and fuel consumption of the M45H had been fulfilled.

On 1 February 1972, the programme was damaged by the loss of the first prototype, which was attributed to an instance of elevator flutter; which played a role in further diminishing the order situation. By late 1974, orders had been placed for the long-lead items to complete an anticipated 30 production VFW-614s, along with sufficient critical items to build up to 50 airliners. By February 1975, only ten aircraft had been ordered. During April 1975, the first production VFW 614 made its first flight; it was delivered to Denmark's Cimber Air four months later.

== Design ==
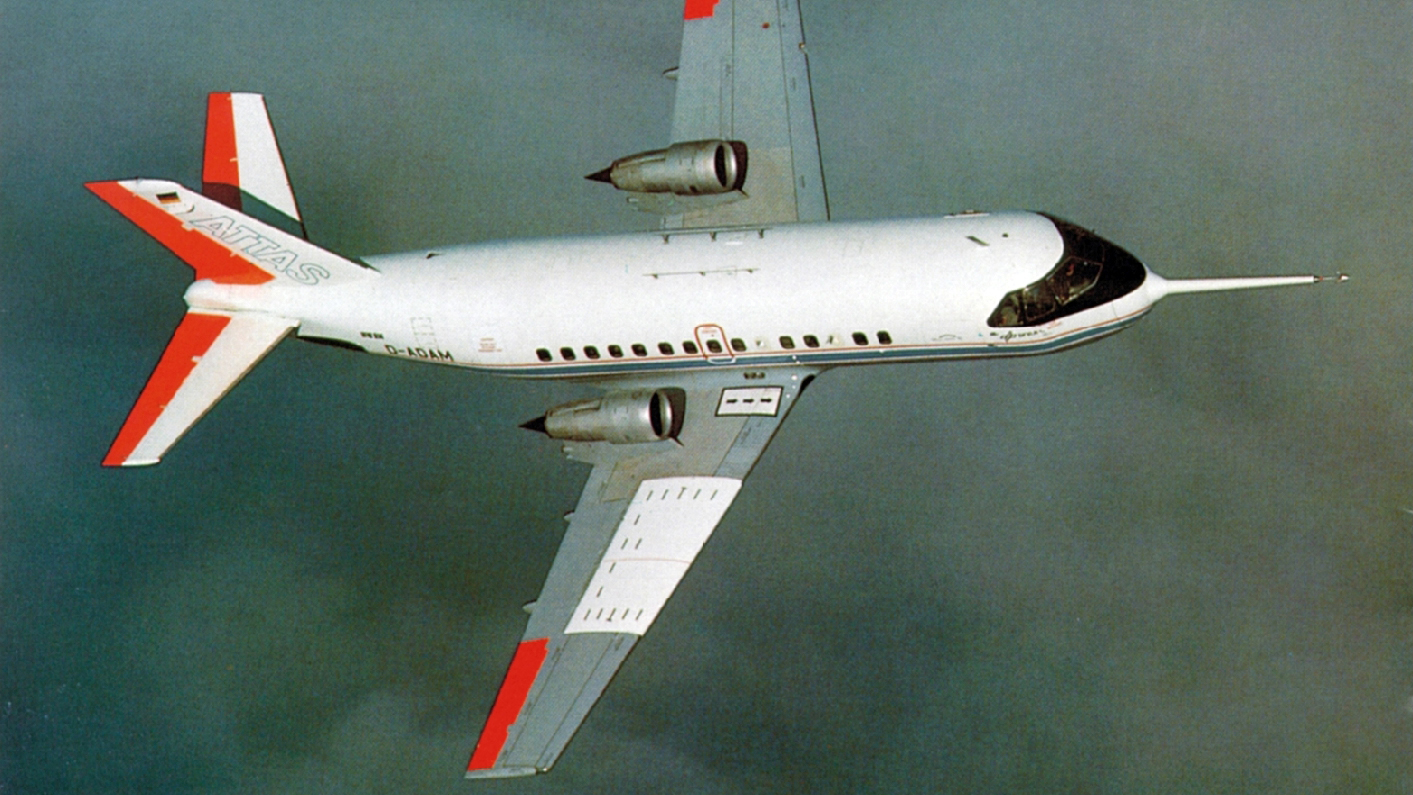
VFW 614 inflight from above

The VFW-Fokker 614 was a twin-engined short haul regional airliner; it was developed as in part to serve as a replacement for the popular propeller-driven pre-war Douglas DC-3. The 614 was the first passenger jetliner to be developed by West Germany, and featured an unconventional engine configuration. In its era, the aircraft was one of the smallest and slowest airliners to have been produced. The VFW 614 was powered by a pair of Rolls-Royce/SNECMA M45H turbofan engines. This powerplant, being relatively quiet and smokeless, had been specially developed to power the airliner. For further internal noise reduction, soundproofing was present within the cabin.

These engines were installed on the airliner in an unconventional manner, having been mounted above the wings upon pylons at a mid-wing position. This arrangement had several advantages, such as avoiding the structural weight penalties imposed by rear-mounted engines and the potential ingestion risks present when engines were mounted beneath the wings. The engine configuration allowed the adoption of a short, sturdy undercarriage, which was specially suited to performing operations from austere or otherwise poorly prepared runways. The position of the engine over the wing, compared to under-wing, also shielded people on the ground from intake noise during flyovers; this shielding effect is also present for aft-mounted engines.

In conjunction with the above-wing engine installation, an unswept wing outfitted with a continuous trailing edge flap was adopted; this possessed no unfavourable interaction with the engine flow. The continuous flap gave excellent low speed performance, however, during high speed travel, interference between the wing and pylon flow fields resulted in flow separation, which in turn limited the cruise speed to M0.65. A recent aircraft, the HondaJet, which also featured an over-wing engine installation, used a high speed natural laminar flow airfoil and an engine configuration that actually produced favorable interference at high speed.

The flight deck of the VFW 614 was designed to facilitate easy two-crew operations. The flight crew are provided with a large windscreen, providing favourable external visibility, and a relatively spacious environment. Instead of using side-mounted consoles, a large centrally mounted console accommodates the primary engine controls and VHF com/nav radio systems, along with the individual controls for adjusting the spoilers, flaps, and trimming. Avionics included a Collins-built flight director, autopilot, and a pilot alerting system.

According to Flight International, the VFW 614 possessed relatively docile and easy to handle flight tendencies, along with light controls, favourable aileron characteristics and a high rate of roll. One negative flight performance attribute was its stall characteristics, which was described as initially occurring "at almost the worst possible place – the inboard end of the ailerons". The stalling regime was explored heavily during the flight test programme, which led to a re-profiling of the wing's leading edge for additional outboard camber being adopted on production aircraft to improve this performance. This gave greater warning and a tendency for relatively straight flight during typical stall conditions.

== Operational history ==
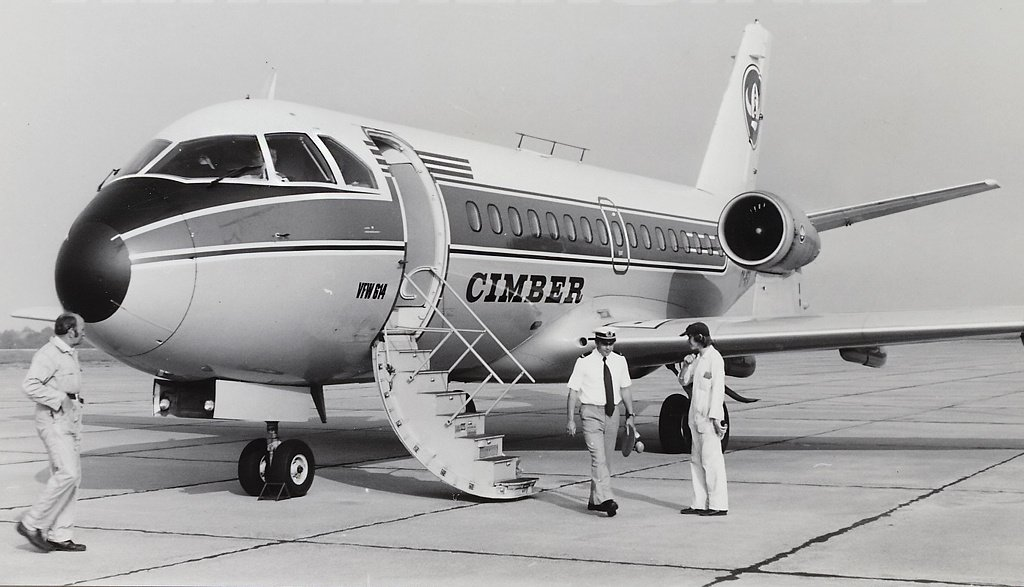
At Cimber Air in 1977

Shortly after the VFW 614's entry to service, it became clear that sales had fallen far short of expectations. According to author Mark E. Mendenhall, the management within VFW-Fokker was divided and split along national lines. A number of German staff in the company attributed the poor sales performance to the Dutch sales team having paid the type little heed, even allegedly regarding it as a competitor to Fokker's established product lines for orders, and that salesmen had prioritised the promotion of Dutch-designed airliners instead. Reportedly, some Dutch managers did hold a preference for their own aircraft, regarding them as established successes and the VFW 614 as a waste of effort to market. Dutch management was alleged by Mendenhall to have interfered with the firm's marketing structure to curtail independence and maintain support for their own aircraft.

West German airline Lufthansa declined to procure any VFW 614s. At the time the company had prioritised its development of long haul routes, for which regional airliners were not applicable, while the German government had declined to pressure the airline to buy the type. According to authors H. Dienel and P. Lyth, Lufthansa's lack of interest in the type was attributed as having been a major factor in the commercial failure of the VFW 614. Only three airlines and the German Air Force would ultimately operate new VFW 614s. The aircraft was initially prone to engine problems, and it was too expensive for the small regional airlines for whose needs it was designed. Three aircraft were flown but were never delivered; a total of four airframes were broken up prior to completion.

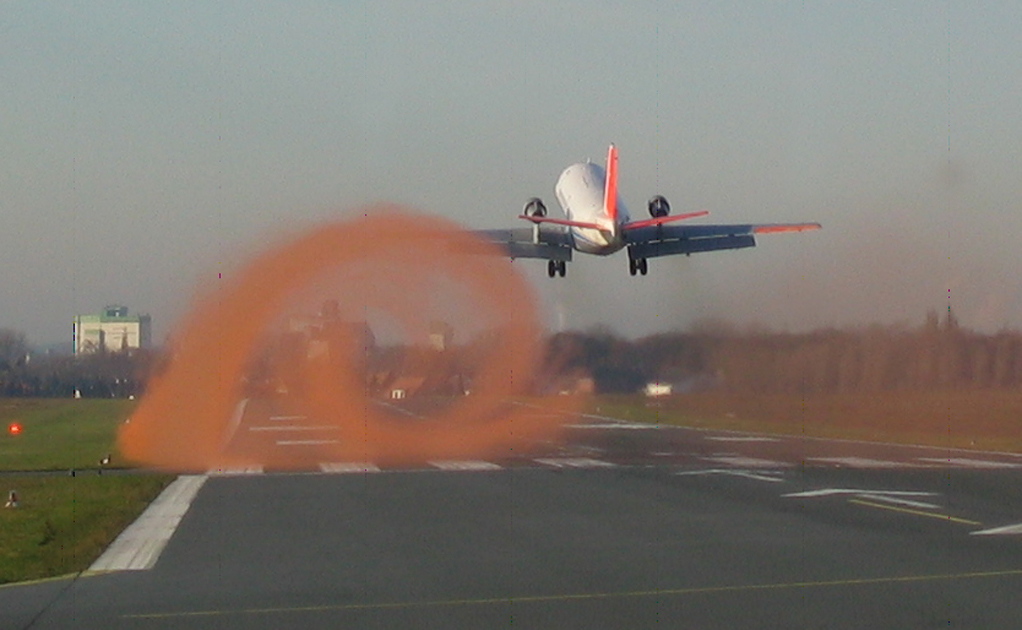
ATTAS used to visualize wingtip vortices

During 1977, the programme was cancelled as a result of the lack of sales, and the last unsold aircraft flew in July 1978. Mendenhall reports that there had been a widespread sentiment amongst German employees that they had been regarded as being subordinate to Fokker, which had increased over time as the VFW 614's commercial failure had become more and more apparent. After 1981 only the German Air Force aircraft remained in service, the last being retired in 1999. The last airworthy VFW 614 was in use with DLR for the Advanced Technologies Testing Aircraft System (ATTAS) project. After being based with DLR in Braunschweig, Germany for many years, this aircraft (registered D-ADAM) was retired in December 2012, to the Deutsches Museum Flugwerft in Oberschleißheim, Germany.

== Operators ==
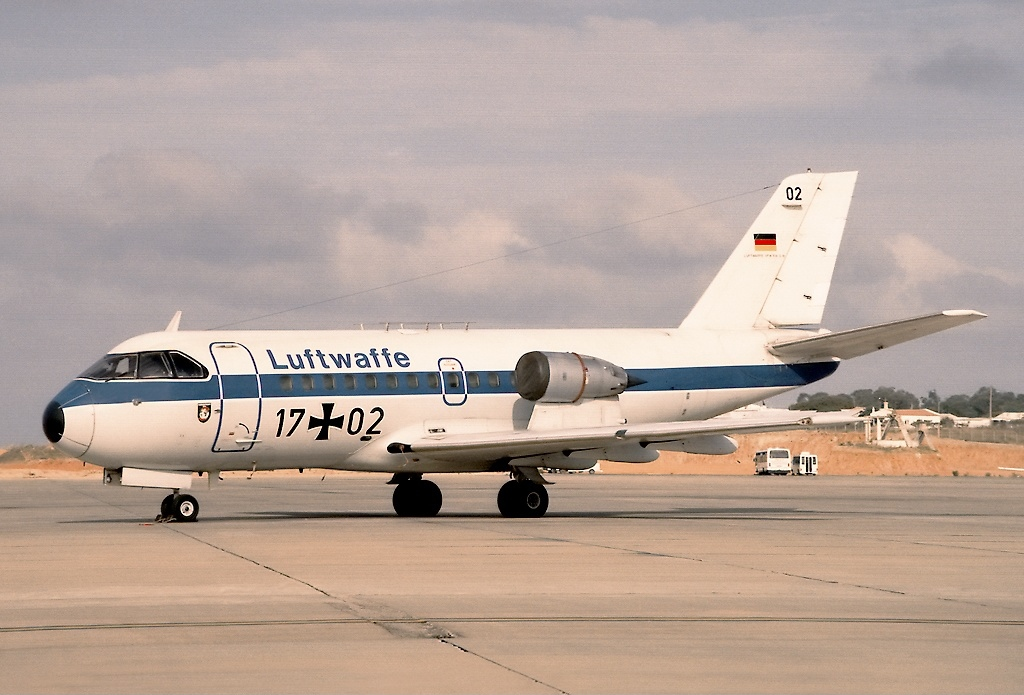
West German Air Force VFW 614

Denmark

- Cimber Air received two aircraft.

France

- Air Alsace bought three aircraft.
- Touraine Air Transport ordered eight aircraft, but cancelled the remaining order after receiving two.

West Germany

- West German Air Force received three aircraft.

== Surviving aircraft ==
Deutsches Museum Flugwerft Schleissheim, Oberschleißheim, Germany, near Munich.

== Specifications (VFW 614) ==
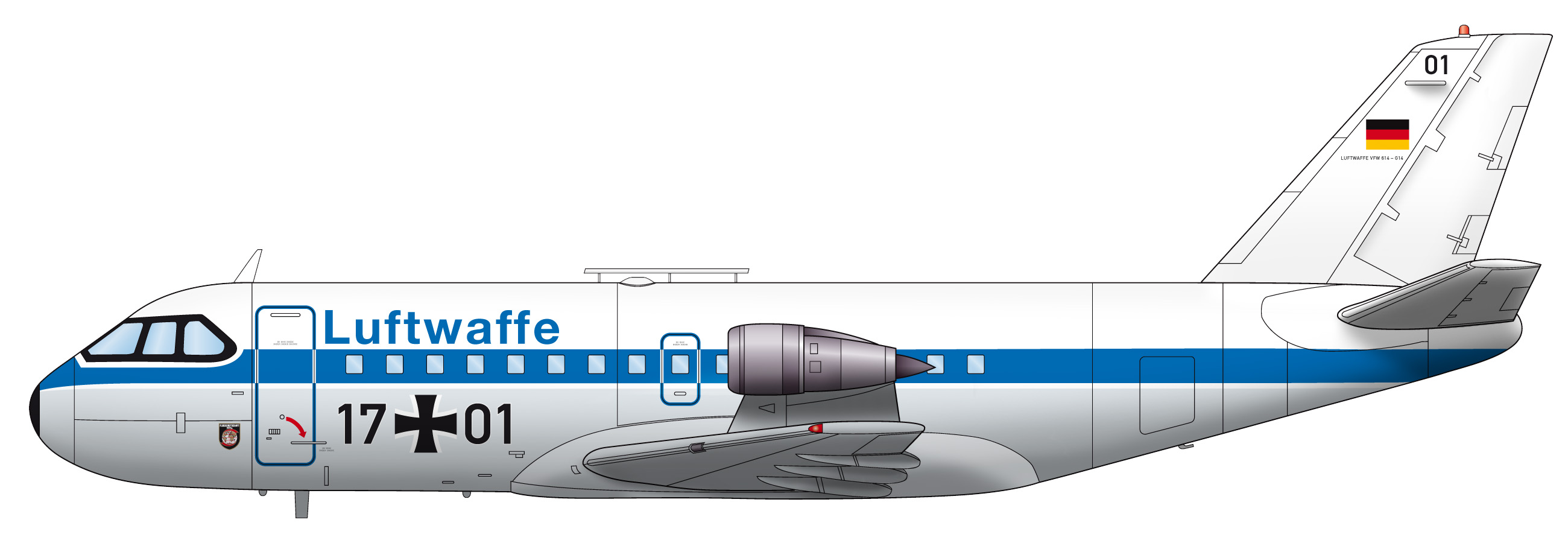
side view

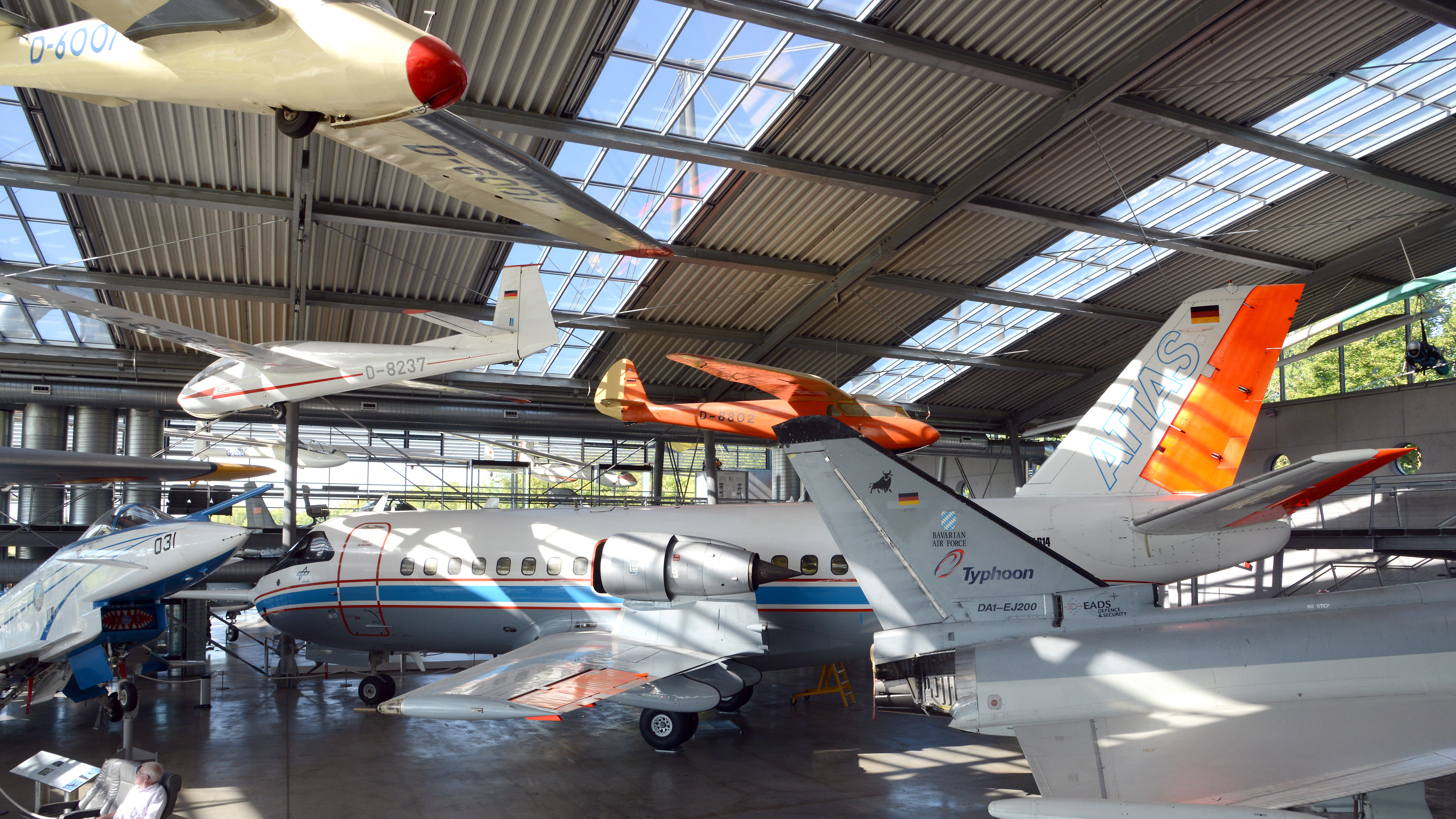
Displayed at Flugwerft Schleißheim

Data from The Observer's Book of Aircraft, 1976. Flight International

General characteristics

- Crew: 2
- Capacity: 40–44 passengers in 4 abreast seating
- Length: 20.6 m (67 ft 7 in)
- Wingspan: 21.5 m (70 ft 6 in)
- Height: 7.82 m (25 ft 8 in)
- Wing area: 64 m^{2} (690 sq ft)
- Airfoil: root: NACA 63A015; tip: NACA 65A012
- Empty weight: 12,179 kg (26,850 lb)
- Max takeoff weight: 19,958 kg (44,000 lb)
- Powerplant: 2 × Rolls-Royce/SNECMA M45H Mk. 501 turbofan engines, 33.2 kN (7,500 lbf) thrust each

Performance

- Maximum speed: 704 km/h (437 mph, 380 kn)
- Range: 1,195 km (743 mi, 645 nmi) with 40 passengers
- Service ceiling: 7,620 m (25,000 ft)
- Rate of climb: 15.75 m/s (3,100 ft/min)

== See also ==
- Honda MH02
- Honda HA-420 HondaJet
