= Weserflug We 271 =

Flying boat

We 271

General information
- Type: Amphibian Flying Boat
- Manufacturer: Weser Flugzeugbau GmbH
- Primary user: Luftwaffe
- Number built: 1

History
- First flight: June 26, 1939

The Weserflug We 271 was a German twin-engined amphibious flying boat prototype, first flown just before World War II.

== Design and development ==
Weser Flugzeugbau (known as Weserflug) was established in April 1934 as a subsidiary company of the major German shipyard, AG Weser, to handle the company's aviation activities, and incorporating Rohrbach Metall-Flugzeugbau which had been brought up by AG Weser in 1932, when Rohrbach was on the brink of bankruptcy. Technical director of the new company was Adolf Rohrbach, the founder of Rohrbach Metall-Flugzeugbau and the developer of a design of all-metal wing with a strong box-shaped main spar to which lightly-built leading and trailing sections could be connected.

Weserflug's main business was licensed production of other companies designs, but it did start development of several projects for indigenous designs, and in 1937 started work on Project P.2131 for a twin-engined, four-seat amphibious flying boat, suitable for both civil and military use. By 1938, the design, which had now gained the internal designation WFG 270, attracted interest from both the Luftwaffe and the Kriegsmarine (Nazi Germany's Air Force and Navy) as a possible liaison, coastal patrol and air-sea-rescue aircraft, although Weserflug saw the aircraft as more of a testbed for the Rohrbach wing, and gained approval from the RLM for construction of a prototype, with the type gaining the RLM type number We 271, with the prototype being designated We 271 V1.

The Weser We 271 was a twin engine, all-metal transport with a cantilever high wing. The lower surfaces of the aircraft's hull were based on those of the Rohrbach Romar. Its wheels retracted into wells in its outrigger floats, which were vertically braced under the engine nacelles. The tailwheel was mounted on a long leg that would be swivelled rearwards to reduce drag. The aircraft was powered by two Argus As 10 air-cooled V8 engines (initially As 10Cs and later As 10Es).

The We 271 V1 flew for the first time from Weserflug's Lemwerder airfield on June 26, 1939, with the aircraft carrying out five test flights that day with a total fight time of 47 minutes. It made its first flight from water two days later. Testing showed that the aircraft had generally acceptable flight characteristics, with good single-engine performance, but the aircraft's rudders were insufficiently powerful, leading to a tendency to swing on takeoff, and the hydraulically operated flaps operated too fast, leading to strong pitching forces. A more severe problem was spray during takeoff and landing, with heavy spray from the fuselage and floats, which were mounted close to the fuselage, combining and reaching up to the engine nacelles, where it quickly damaged the propellers and risked being ingested into the engines. Water deflectors were fitted to the fuselage and floats to reduce this hazard, but the problem was never completely solved.

In the spring of 1940 it was flown to the testing centre at Rechlin but the next year it was nearly shot down by a Spitfire. It was transferred to the testing station at Travemünde on 1 May 1942, after which there are no further records of the We 271 V1, and it is assumed to have been scrapped later in the war.

Weserflug proposed two derivatives of the We 271 in 1941, Project P2146 and P2147. Both designs featured gull wings, which raised the engines higher above the water, and had the floats further out on the wings, with the undercarriage mainwheels retracting into the fuselage. Project 2147 was a four seater to be powered by two 235 hp (175 kW) Hirth HM 508 C engines, while Project 2146 was a six-seater, to be powered by 310 hp (230 kW) Argus As 410 engines. Neither design was built.

== Specifications (We 271) ==
Data from Verschwunden und fast vergessen (Note: The aircraft specifications differ significantly between sources. Nowarra claims a span of 13 m (42 ft 8 in) and a takeoff weight of 2,600 kg (5,700 lb) or 3,500 kg (7,700 lb), while Němeček gives two differing sets of specifications, one from a 1973 issue of Der Flieger magazine, with a span of 15.06 m (49 ft 5 in), a takeoff weight of 2,680 kg (5,910 lb) and a maximum speed of 275 km/h (171 mph; 148 kn) and the other from a 1992 edition of Flieger Revue magazine, with a span of 15.2 m (49 ft 10 in), a takeoff weight of 2,900 kg (6,400 lb) and a maximum speed of 233 km/h (145 mph; 126 kn).)

General characteristics

- Crew: 1
- Capacity: 3 passengers
- Length: 10.24 m (33 ft 7 in)
- Wingspan: 15.20 m (49 ft 10 in)
- Empty weight: 2,304 kg (5,079 lb)
- Gross weight: 2,900 kg (6,393 lb)
- Powerplant: 2 × Argus As 10 E V-8 air-cooled inverted piston engines, 200 kW (270 hp) each

Performance

- Maximum speed: 233 km/h (145 mph, 126 kn)
- Stall speed: 115 km/h (71 mph, 62 kn) (landing speed)
- Service ceiling: 3,400 m (11,200 ft)
- Time to altitude: 4.8 min to 1,000 m (3,300 ft)
