= Podded engine =

Externally mounted aircraft engine

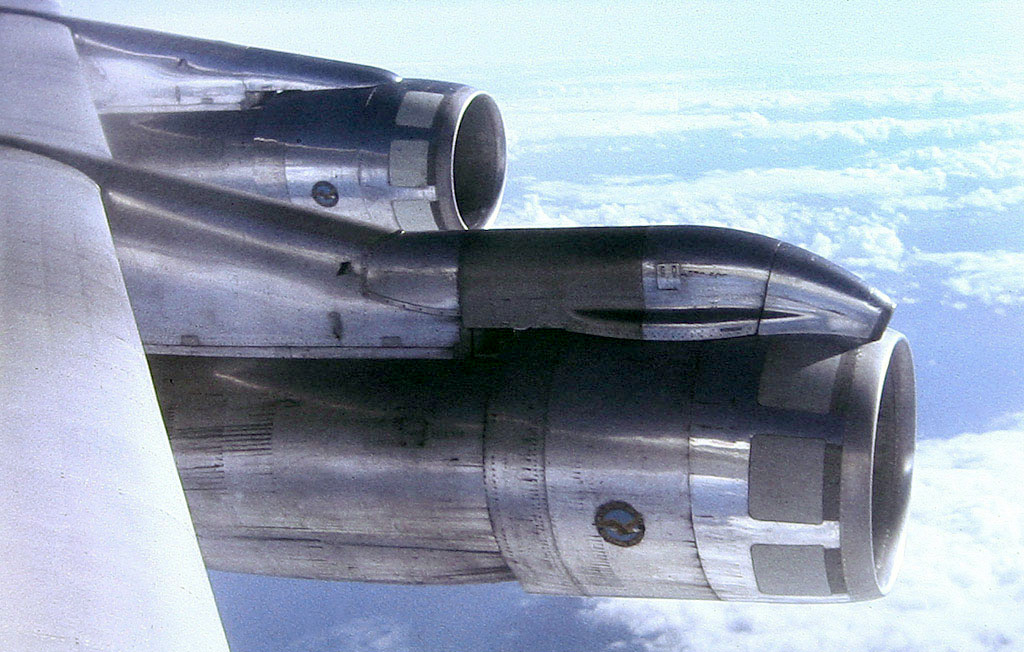
Podded engines on a Boeing 707.

A podded engine is a jet engine that has been built up and integrated in its nacelle. This may be done in a podding facility as part of an aircraft assembly process. The nacelle contains the engine, engine mounts and parts which are required to run the engine in the aircraft, known as the EBU (Engine Build Up). The nacelle consists of an inlet, an exhaust nozzle and a cowling which opens for access to the engine accessories and external tubing. The exhaust nozzle may include a thrust reverser. The podded engine is a complete powerplant, or propulsion system, and is usually attached below the wing on large aircraft like commercial airliners or to the rear fuselage on smaller aircraft such as business jets.

== Engine Build Up ==
The EBU components connect the engine systems with the aircraft systems. Engine build up includes installation of an engine starter, hydraulic pumps, electrical generators and firewire and components which connect the engine to the aircraft. They include the following

- electrical harnesses for control, for example a thrust request from the flight deck needs an electrical path to the electronic control on the engine.
- electric cables for power, electricity generated on the engine has to connect to the aircraft electrical system.
- hydraulic hoses, hydraulic fluid from the aircraft hydraulic system has to be supplied to engine-mounted pumps and then returned under high pressure to the aircraft. High pressure fluid is returned to the nacelle for actuating a thrust reverser.
- fuel tube, fuel has to get from the aircraft tanks to the engine fuel pump.
- air tubes, high pressure air from the engine is supplied to the aircraft environmental control system and for aircraft anti-icing.

== The nacelle and the engine ==
A nacelle is a streamlined covering for a jet engine which incorporates the air inlet and exhaust outlet for the engine. The inlet is connected to a mounting flange on the front of the engine fan case. The exhaust nozzle, which may incorporate a thrust reverser, is connected to a mounting flange on the rear of the engine exhaust case. A cowling, streamlined between the inlet and exhaust, completes the nacelle. It has opening doors which allow access for regular maintenance such as adding oil as well as unscheduled replacement of engine accessories and external tubing.

How well the engine performs depends on the nacelle design. The shape of the lip on the inlet, the minimum internal area and the internal profile, are established with different engine airflows at cruise to keep pressure losses acceptable, and different incident airflow angles such as in cross-winds and during take-off rotation to keep variations in pressure across the fan face acceptable. Pressure losses, and hence overall pressure ratio, affect engine performance or fuel consumption for each pound of thrust. Pressure variations affect engine operability or likelihood of surging. Pressure losses in the exhaust nozzle also affect the engine performance by increasing the fuel consumption.

The nacelle forms the outer flow path along the engine to ensure accessories operate within their temperature limits and fire extinguisher flows are effective.

== Wing-mounted podded engines ==
Placing engines on the wing provides beneficial wing bending relief in flight. The further the engines are away from the fuselage the greater the wing bending relief, therefore engines mounted close to the fuselage (in the wing root) provide little relief. Almost all modern large jet airplanes use engines in pods located a significant distance from the wing root for substantial wing bending relief. The pods are in front of the wing to help avoid flutter of the wing which, in turn, allows a much lighter wing structure.

== Fuselage-mounted podded engines ==
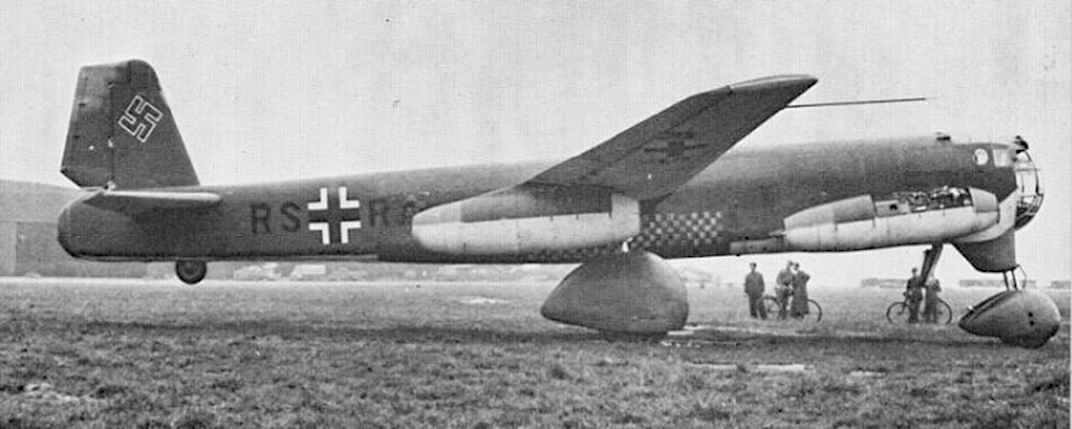
Junkers Ju287 showing front fuselage-mounted pod and underwing pod

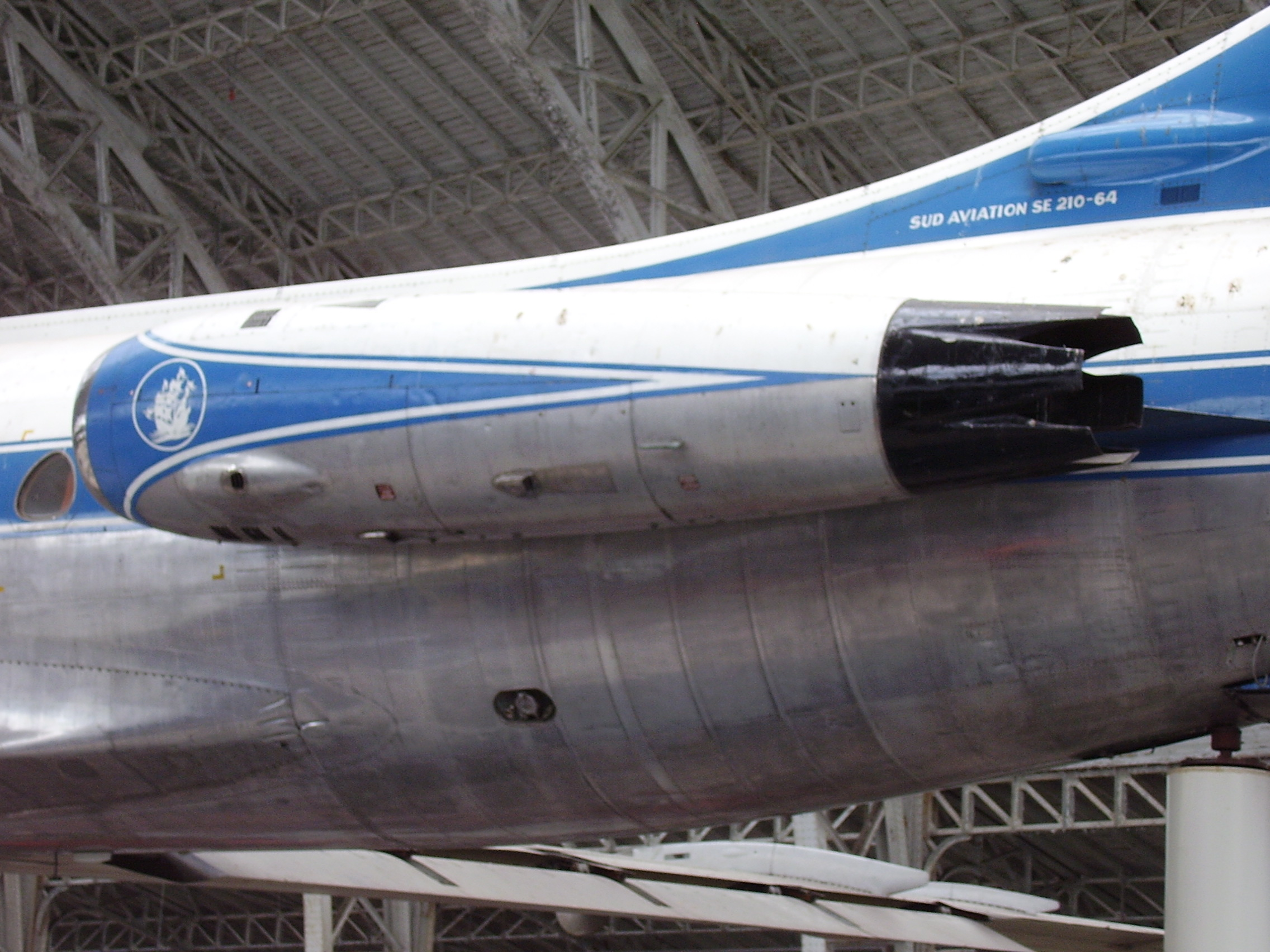
The 1955 SE 210 Caravelle pioneered aft engine mounting

An early example of fuselage mounting, the Junkers Ju 287, had two of its four engines mounted on the front fuselage. The same position was used for two of the three engines on the Martin XB-51.

Smaller jet airplanes like the Cessna Citation are generally not suited to podded engines below the wing because this would place the engines too close to the ground. This is also the case with aircraft designed to operate from unimproved grass or gravel runways. Instead, in these cases it is common to mount two (or occasionally four) podded engines on the rear of the fuselage, where they are less likely to be damaged by ingesting foreign objects from the ground.

This mounting location provides no wing bending relief but, following an engine failure, does offer much less yaw due to asymmetric thrust than would wing-mounted engines. To face the local flow of air, most engines on the rear of a fuselage are installed slightly nose-high. The local airflow at the airplane's tail is typically descending with respect to the centerline of the aircraft's fuselage.

== Overwing podded engines ==
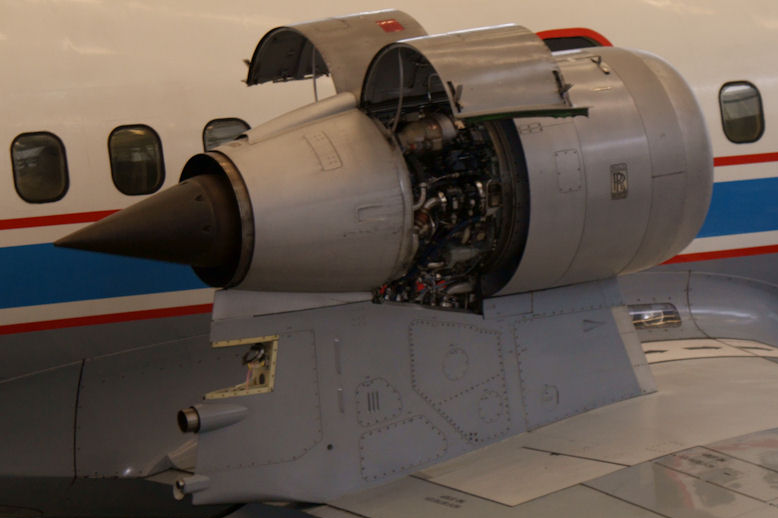
The VFW-Fokker 614's overwing podded Rolls-Royce/SNECMA M45H

Unusual examples of engine placement are the VFW-614 and Hondajet which mount the engines above the wing.

The Antonov An-72 and Boeing YC-14 also place their engines above the wings, but in a high-lift, or STOL, configuration where the engine exhaust passes over the upper surface of the blown flaps. This placement uses the Coandă effect to give a lower minimum flight speed and decrease the length of runway needed for takeoff and landing.

== Over-fuselage podded engines ==
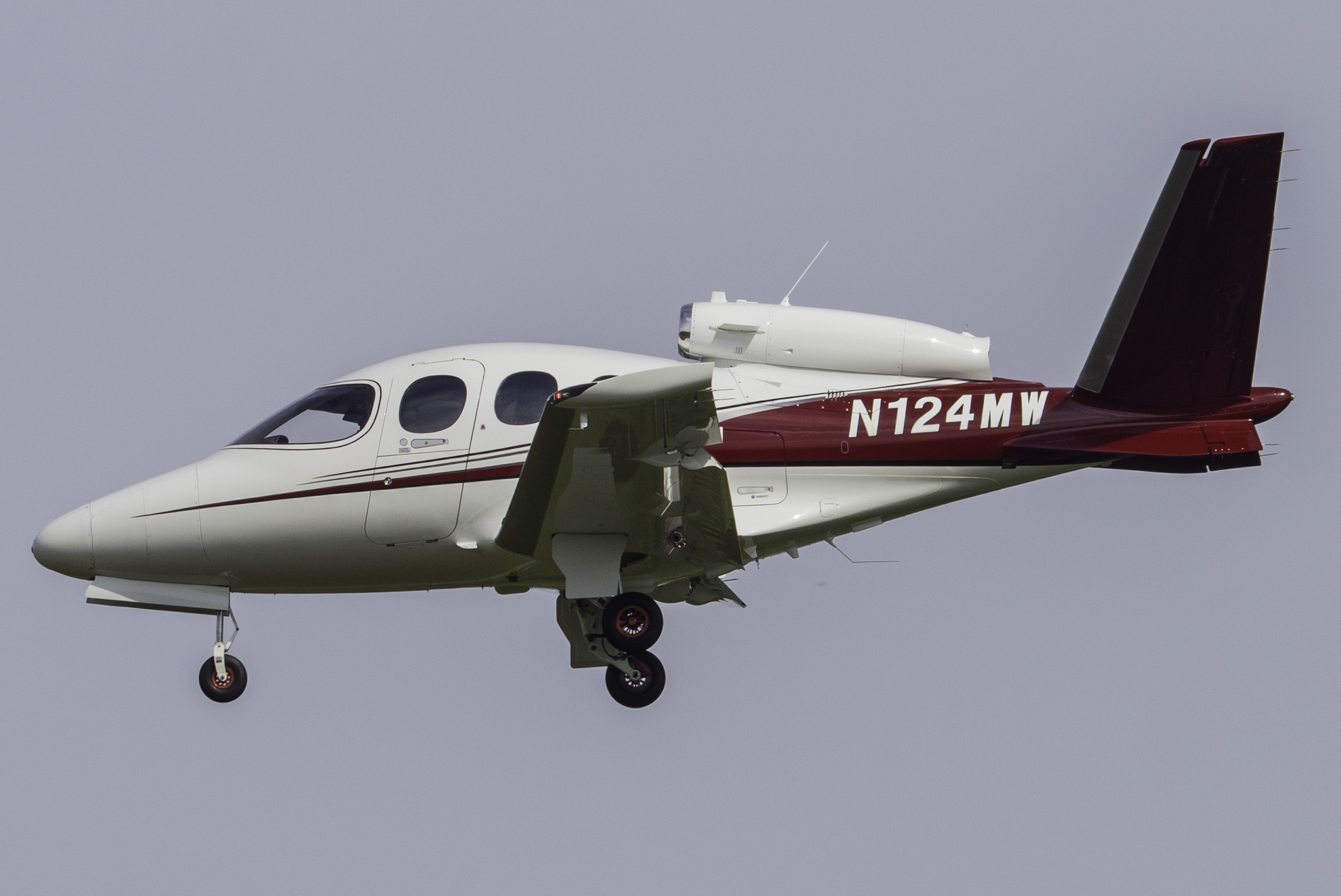
The Cirrus Vision SF50, currently the only certified single-engine civilian jet aircraft with a fuselage-mounted engine.

Another unusual scheme is to mount the engine in a pod above the fuselage. The Heinkel He 162, Virgin Atlantic GlobalFlyer, and Cirrus Vision SF50 are three examples. In general, the idea is to mount the engine where it will receive good air flow, be distant from the ground to avoid foreign object damage, and not occupy fuselage space.

== Military aircraft ==
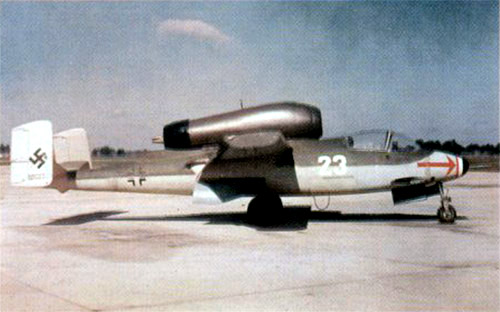
The He 162 uses a pod above the fuselage.

Some jet fighters use podded engines, typically under and mounted directly to the wing. An example was the Messerschmitt Me 262, which had the nacelles mounted directly to the undersides of the wings, with no pylons being used. The A-10 Thunderbolt II ground-attack aircraft uses fuselage-mounted podded turbofan engines. The Heinkel He 162 had a single BMW 003E jet engine in a pod mounted over the fuselage.

Stealthy designs do not use podded engines. Instead the engines are contained within the fuselage to minimize radar cross section.

Many military transport aircraft, bombers, and tankers use podded engines.
