= Weserflug P.1003 =

P.1003
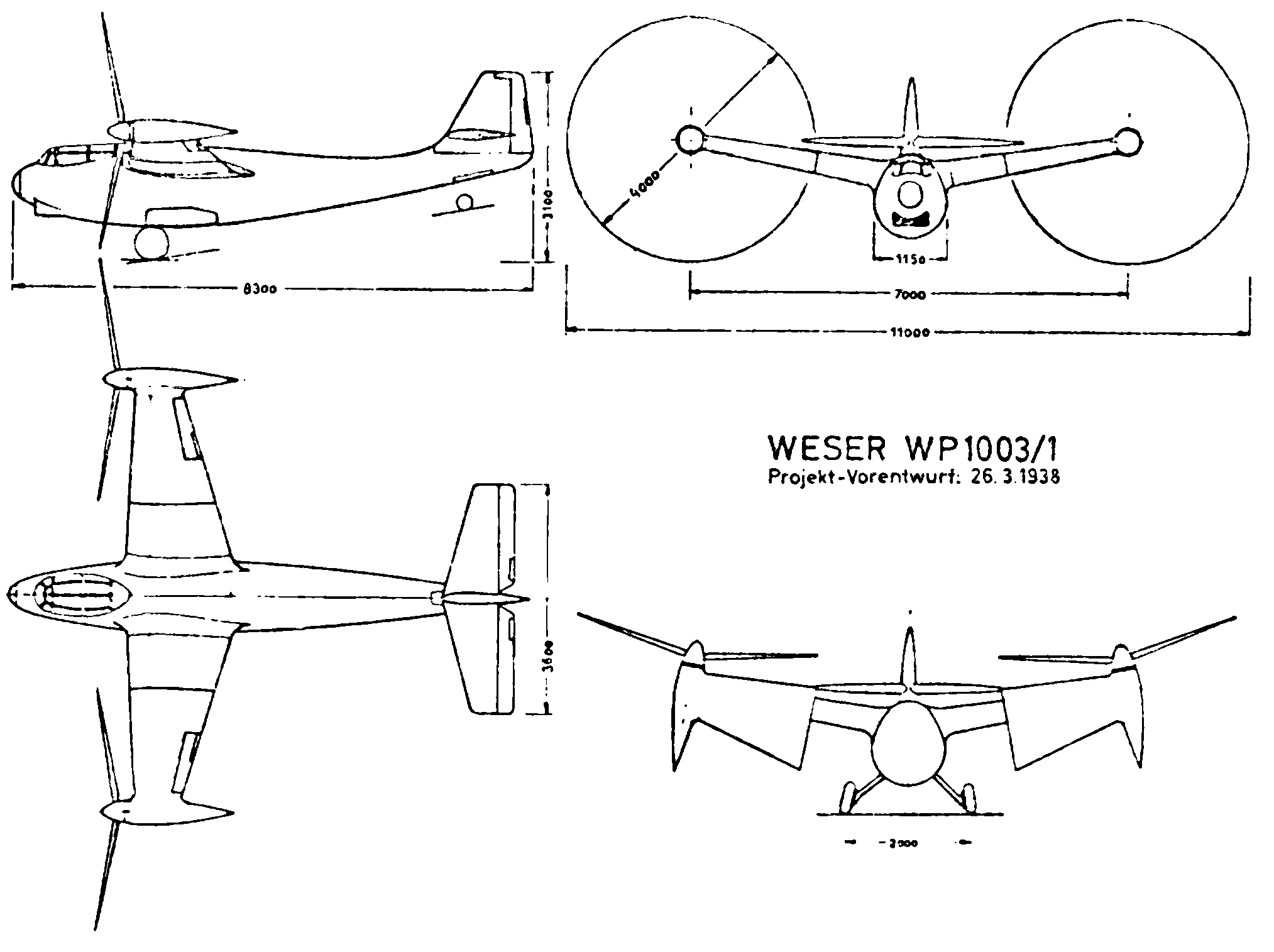
- A three way-view of the projected Weserflug P.1003.

General information
- Type: VTOL Tilt-rotor
- National origin: Nazi Germany
- Manufacturer: Weser Flugzeugbau
- Status: Project only
- Number built: 0

The Weserflug P.1003, was a two-seat German aircraft designed in 1938 by Weserflug. The aim of the project was to construct a military tilt rotor aircraft with VTOL characteristics for use in World War II.

At the beginning of 1938 plans for a tilt rotor aircraft were drawn up, and the project, named P.1003, was supported by the Reichsluftfahrtministerium. The aircraft was a monoplane featuring a fairly conventional fuselage. The aircraft was built with high mounted wings that could be hinged halfway along, and with a propeller at each wing tip. A single Daimler-Benz DB 600 engine was mounted in the middle of the fuselage, and drive shafts connected the engine to the propellers, which were abnormally large with a diameter of 4 metres, where for a similar aircraft the propellers would have had a diameter of 2 metres. The initial plans included the aircraft being fitted with retractable landing gear.

For takeoff, the entire outer part of the wing could be rotated 90 degrees so that the propellers pointed straight up, lifting the aircraft off the ground in a manner similar to that of a helicopter. Once in the air, the wing and the propeller would be rotated to a horizontal position, so the plane could go into horizontal flight.

The aircraft was never constructed due to the complexity of the VTOL system.
