= VFW-Fokker H3 Sprinter =

1970s German experimental helicopter

H3 Sprinter
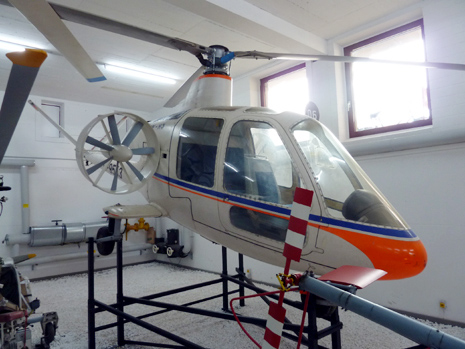
- VFW-Fokker H3 on display at the Hubschraubermuseum Bückeburg

General information
- Type: Experimental rotorcraft
- Manufacturer: VFW-Fokker

History
- Manufactured: 2
- First flight: 15 March 1971

The VFW-Fokker H3 Sprinter was a single-engined experimental rotorcraft designed and built in West Germany. Two aircraft were produced by VFW-Fokker in the early 1970s, registered D-9543 and D-9544. Intended as the first of a family of tip-jet driven helicopters the two H3 prototypes flew briefly but the method of rotor propulsion was found to be unsuccessful for this size of aircraft. Due to a high rotor overspeed, they could perform jump take-offs to 280 feet (85 m) at a rate of 1,600 feet (490 m) per minute. An improved H4 variant was designed but not built.

== Aircraft on display ==
Both aircraft have survived. D-9543 is currently on display at the Hubschraubermuseum Bückeburg with the other H3 thought to be in a private collection in Germany.

== Specifications (H3) ==
Data from Jane's Pocket Book of Research and Experimental Aircraft, 1976.

General characteristics

- Crew: One
- Capacity: 2 passengers and 270 kg (595 lb)
- Length: 7.37 m (24 ft 2.25 in)
- Wingspan: 8.70 m (28 ft 6.52 in)
- Height: 2.50 m (8 ft 2.43 in)
- Max takeoff weight: 968 kg (2,134 lb)
- Powerplant: 1 × Allison 250-C18 turboshaft

Performance

- Cruise speed: 250 km/h (155 mph, 135 kn)
- Service ceiling: 4,000 m (13,120 ft)

== See also ==
Aircraft of comparable role, configuration, and era

- Bell 533

Related lists

- List of VTOL aircraft
