= Cimber Sterling =

Regional airline of Denmark (1950–2012)

Cimber Air and Cimber Sterling

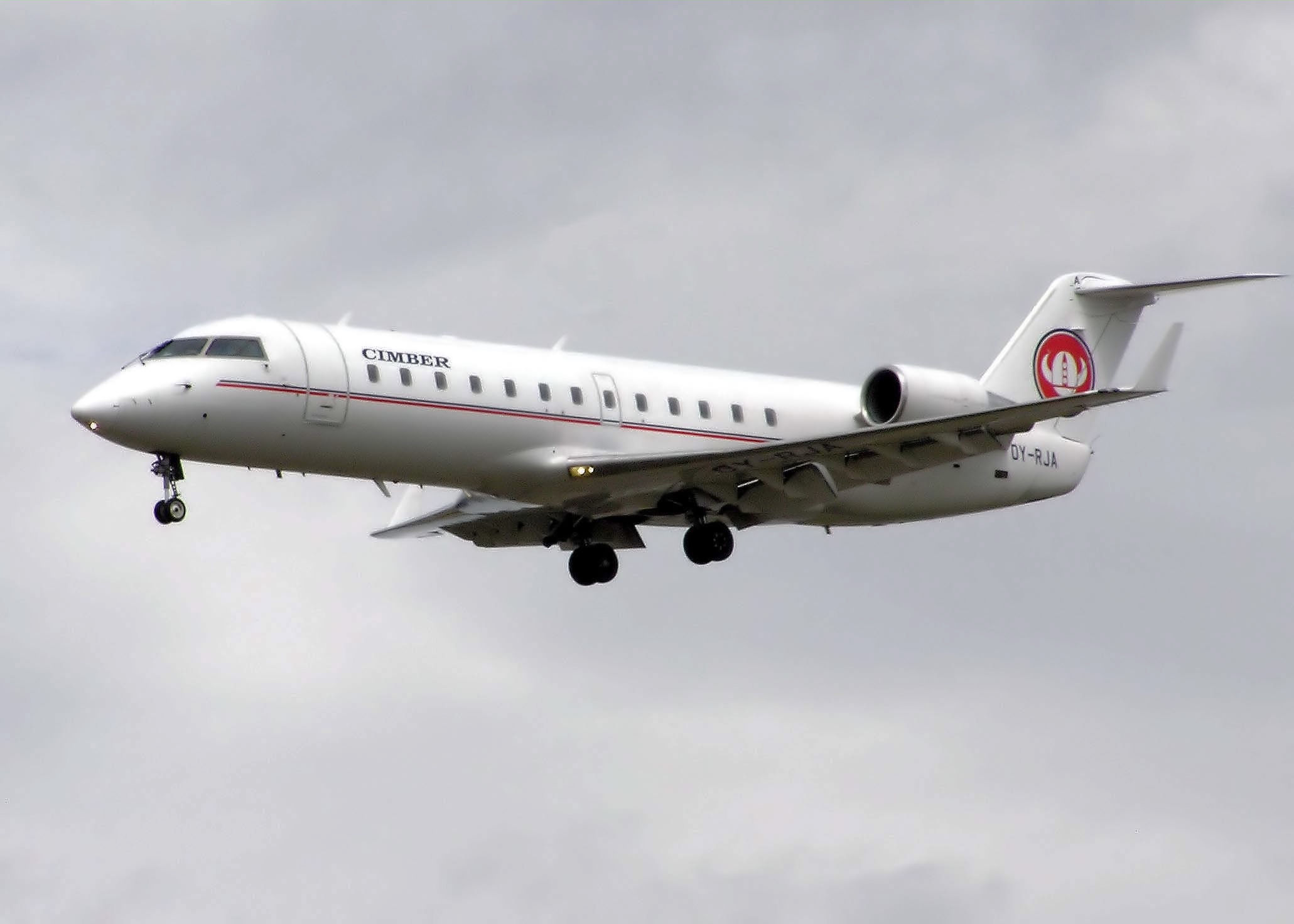
- Bombardier CRJ-200
IATA	ICAO	Call sign
QI	CIM	CIMBER
- Founded: 1950 (as Cimber Air)
- Ceased operations: 3 May 2012
- Operating bases: Aalborg Airport; Billund Airport; Copenhagen Airport
- Frequent-flyer program: EuroBonus
- Alliance: Team Lufthansa (1998–2003)
- Parent company: Mansvell Enterprises
- Headquarters: Sønderborg, Denmark
- Key people: Jan Palmer (CEO); Jacob Krogsgaard (deputy CEO, CCO); Martins Antonovics (deputy CEO, CFO); Gregory Gurtovoy (Chairman)
- Website: www.cimber.com

Cimber Sterling A/S, previously Cimber Air Service A/S and later styled Cimber Sterling, was a Danish airline based in Sønderborg, Denmark, operating scheduled domestic and international services in co-operation with Scandinavian Airlines (SAS) and Lufthansa. Its main bases were Copenhagen Airport and Billund Airport, with a smaller base at Aalborg Airport.

== History ==
=== The beginning ===
Cimber Air was established in 1950s by the 26 year old pilot Ingolf Lorenz Nielson who took over Sønderjyllands Flyveselskab. This was a small company which had been active since 1947. After Nielson took over in 1953 he changed the name to Cimber Air Service A/S to recall the name of a Jutland tribe of 2nd century B.C. This historical connection was reflected in the airline's emblem, a Viking-style helmet. The first aircraft of the fleet was a single engined SAI KZ III which had been previously used for flights primarily between Sønderborg and Copenhagen. Aerial photography, air taxi, panoramic flights were the kind of initial operations. By 1955 the tiny airline had ventured in Germany and had built up a fleet of some 17 light aircraft. Later on Cimber air took delivery of an eight-seat De Havilland Dove twin-engine light airliner - a total of 7 entered the fleet in late 1950s and early 1960s - with which the first true charter operations began together with mail runs. This twin-engined British craft allowed also to start the first scheduled route from Soenderborg to Copenhagen in 1963.

=== Expansion with turboprops ===
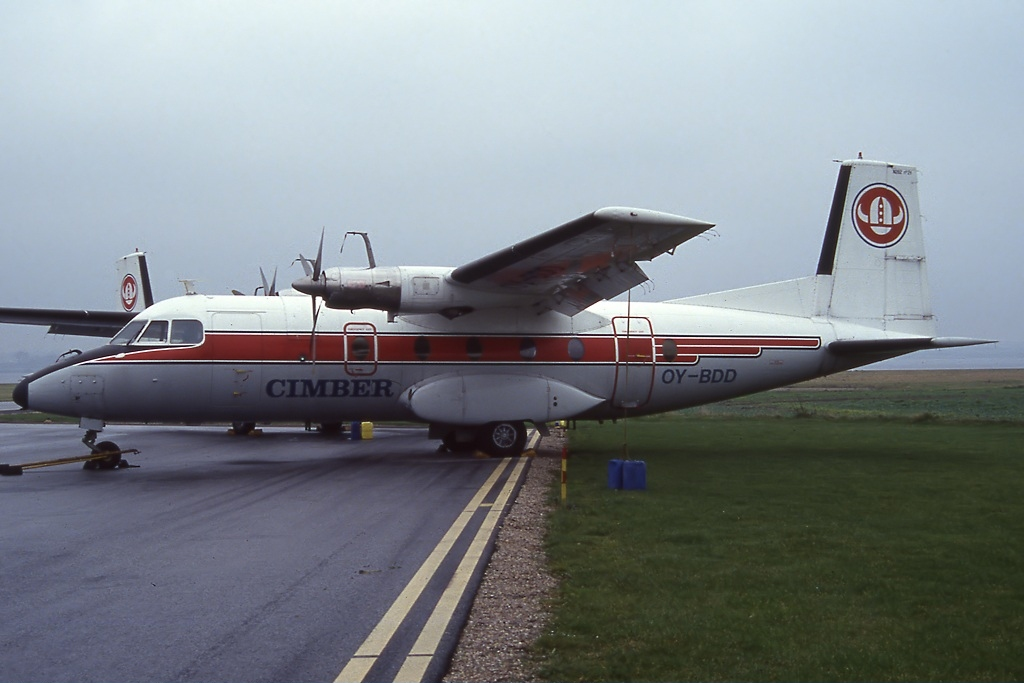
Cimber Air Nord 262, 1993

The year 1967 was a real turning point, marked by the delivery of the first of four Nord 262s. This twin-engined turboprop regional airliner allowed to expand the network which was partly made up by flight on Lufthansa behalf. This agreement was effected through the creation of the German subsidiary 'Cimber Air Service Deutscheland’ which connected Flensburg with Soenderborg and Hamburg. In 1971 the Danish authorities decide to rationalise the nation domestic services. So Cimber Air joined with SAS and Maersk Air in giving life to Danair consortium airline, controlling 15% of it. The contract with Lufthansa expired in 1973 but Ingolf Nielson was already thinking of jetliners. So the airline became one of the very few operators of the VFW-Fokker 614 regional jet. A total of eight samples was planned but when the production ceased due to lack of orders Cimber Air took the decision to go for the larger Fokker F28. At the same time, the old facilities at Sonderborg airport were abandoned and the company built a new one complex, complete with air terminal and a technical base. A Grumman Gulfstream I turboprop aircraft was sometimes used for scheduled services.

=== Efficient aircraft ===
The energy crisis of 1979-1980 hit hard and despite the reduction in ticket prices, the accounts went into the red. The F28s were leased abroad and the routes saw the use of a Fokker F27. This was later joined by two Nord 262s purchased in the U.S.A. In 1983 the cycle of losses was halted and the number of flown passengers reached 56,000. But the time to purchase a more modern and efficient regional aircraft had already come. The choice fell on the Franco-Italian ATR 42, of which three were ordered with deliveries starting in 1992. Their use proved satisfactory above all due to the low ratio between the payload and fuel consumption. The use of the ATR 42 significantly improved passenger service and the company's financial performance. These good results encouraged the company to purchase its larger sibling, the ATR 72 which entered into service in early 1999. In 1996 Cimber Air became part of the Team Lufthansa group of regional air carriers, which lasted until 2004

The following year brought further innovations: during the summer, the first two Canadair CRJ200s were taken delivery of. It was an advanced regional jetliner that made possible to fly longer routes such as, for example, Billund-Milan and Billund-Munich, or from Copenhagen to Bucharest, Kiev, Montpellier.

In May 1998, Scandinavian Airlines purchased a 26% stake but it will be sold back in March 2003. In the early 2000s, all operations were under the control of the Cimber Aviation Group. The carrier's fleet consisted of three ATR 42s, eight ATR 72s, and seven Canadair CRJ200s. The network was made up by a total of 17 different routes and over 600 flights per week.

=== Times of changes ===
Cimber Sterling Boeing 737-700, 2010

After the demise of Sterling Airways in October 2008, Cimber Air acquired its AOC, brand, website and its slots at Copenhagen-Kastrup Airport on 3 December. Aircraft leases were negotiated with the lessors. Employees of Sterling were not part of the takeover, but were invited to seek employment in the new airline. A new airline, named ‘’’Cimber Sterling’’’, was created on 7 January 2009 and started flying seven days later.

The new air carrier Cimber Sterling had a network of some 30 European destinations. Charters and leasing services were also offered. The fleet was made up of 3 ATR 42, 5 ATR 72, 11 Canadair CRJ and 6 Boeing 737-700. It was listed on the Copenhagen Stock Exchange in 2009. The previous Cimber Air halted all residual operations on December 22, 2009 and merged into the main air carrier.

Despite promising prospects, the airline's business did not prosper as hoped, also due to the 2008 U.S. financial crisis, which also reached Europe in the following 12 months. In early 2011 Cimber Sterling was basically a low-cost airline linking eight Scandinavian cities. In addition, 11 European nations were reached while charter destinations favoured the Mediterranean basin, Canary Islands and Madeira.

Due to financial difficulties in 2011 Cimber Sterling entered into a subscription agreement with Cyprus-based Mansvell Enterprises Ltd., which gave Ukrainian billionaire Ihor Kolomoyskyi a stake of 70.8%.

But this was not enough. On the morning of 3 May 2012, Cimber Sterling cancelled all flights and declared bankruptcy. Within hours, other airlines announced their entry on selected routes. A new airline - Cimber Air A/S - was immediately reborn.

== Sponsoring ==
Cimber Sterling was the main sponsor of the Danish handball team in 2009 and 2010.

== Fleet ==
The Cimber Sterling fleet included the following aircraft (as of 11 December 2013):

Cimber Sterling fleet
Aircraft	In service	Orders	Passengers	Notes
ATR 72-200	2		68	
Bombardier CRJ200	5	0	50	
Total	7	0		

== Gallery ==
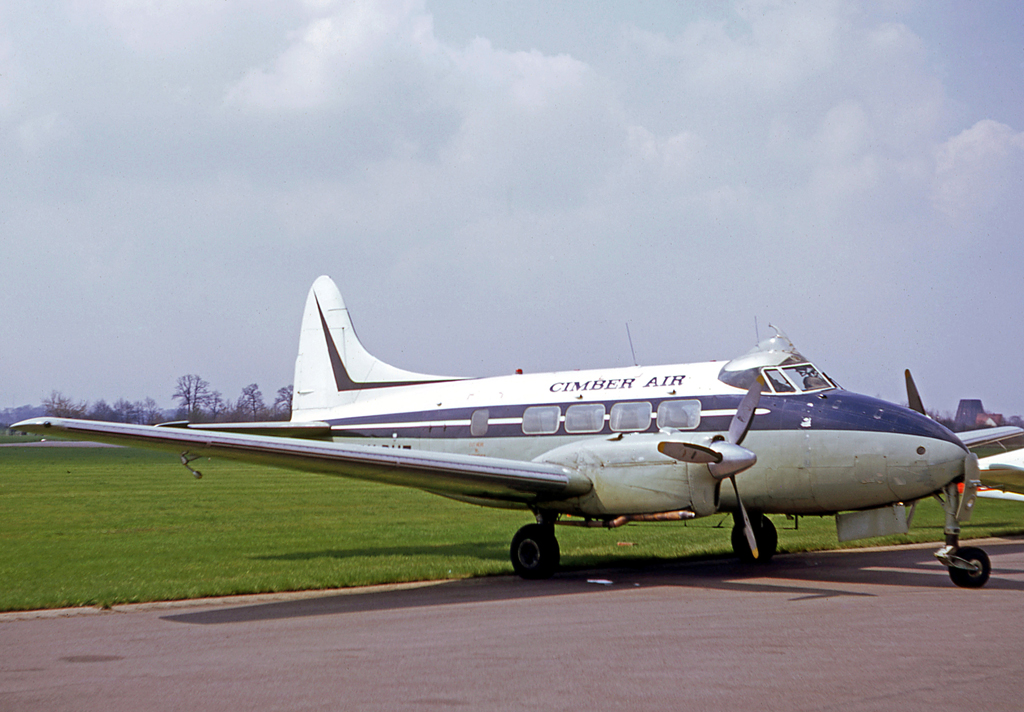
de Havilland Dove

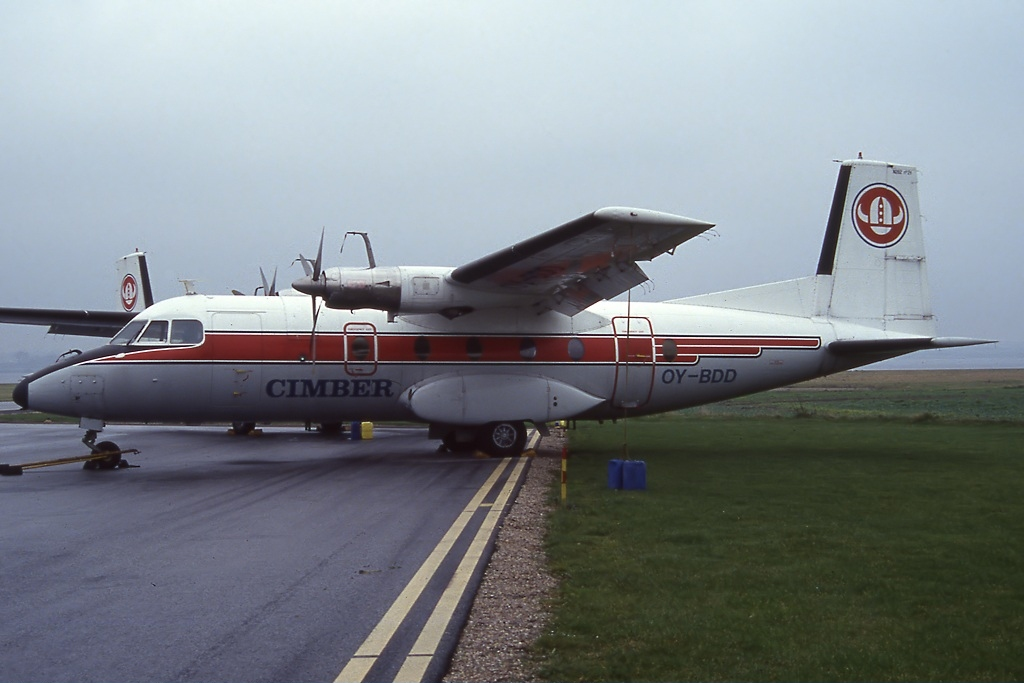
Nord 262

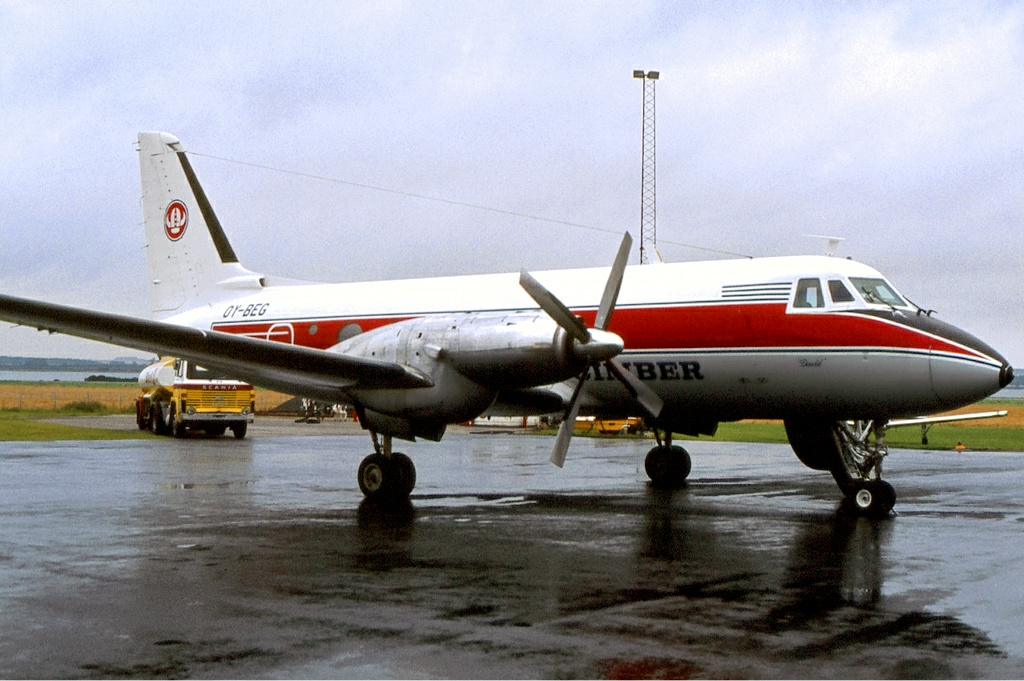
Grumman Gulfstream I

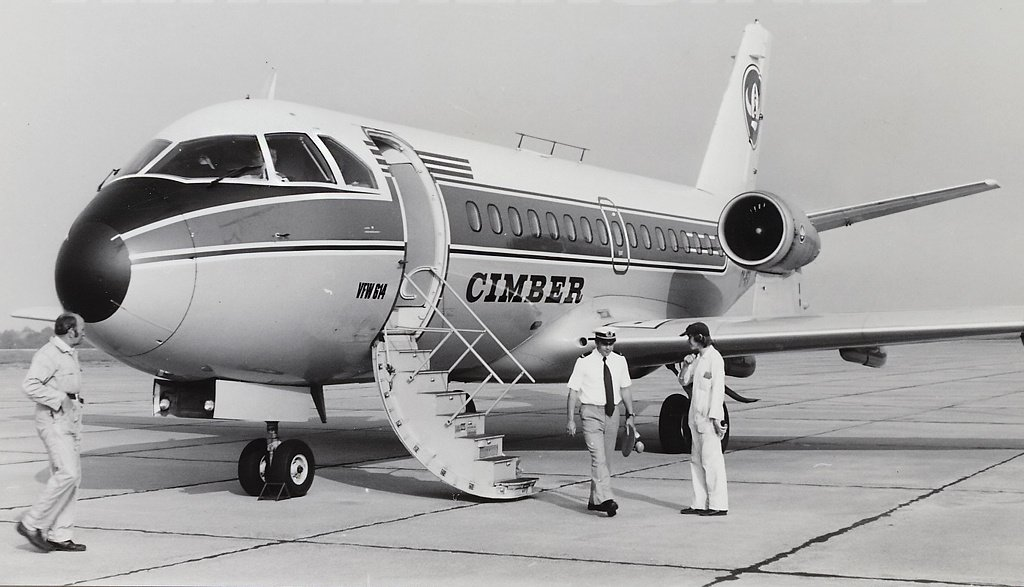
VFW-Fokker 614

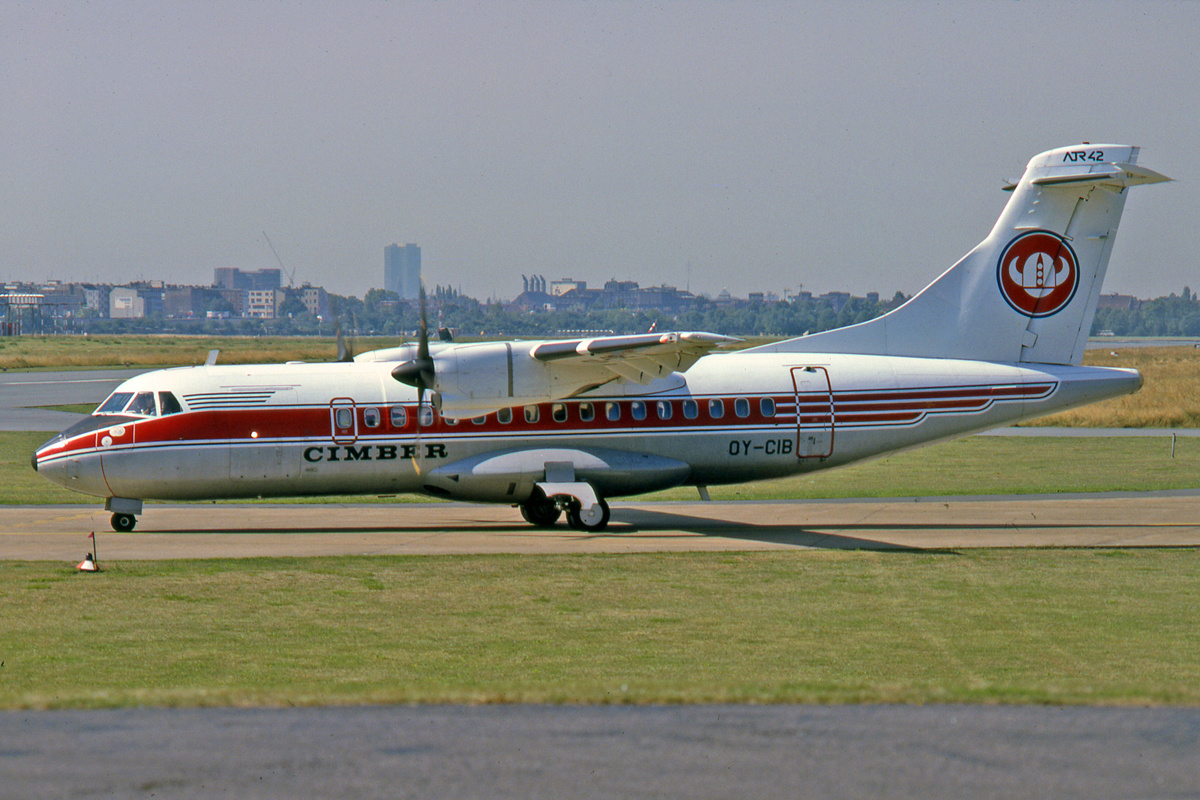
ATR 42-200 in the first colors

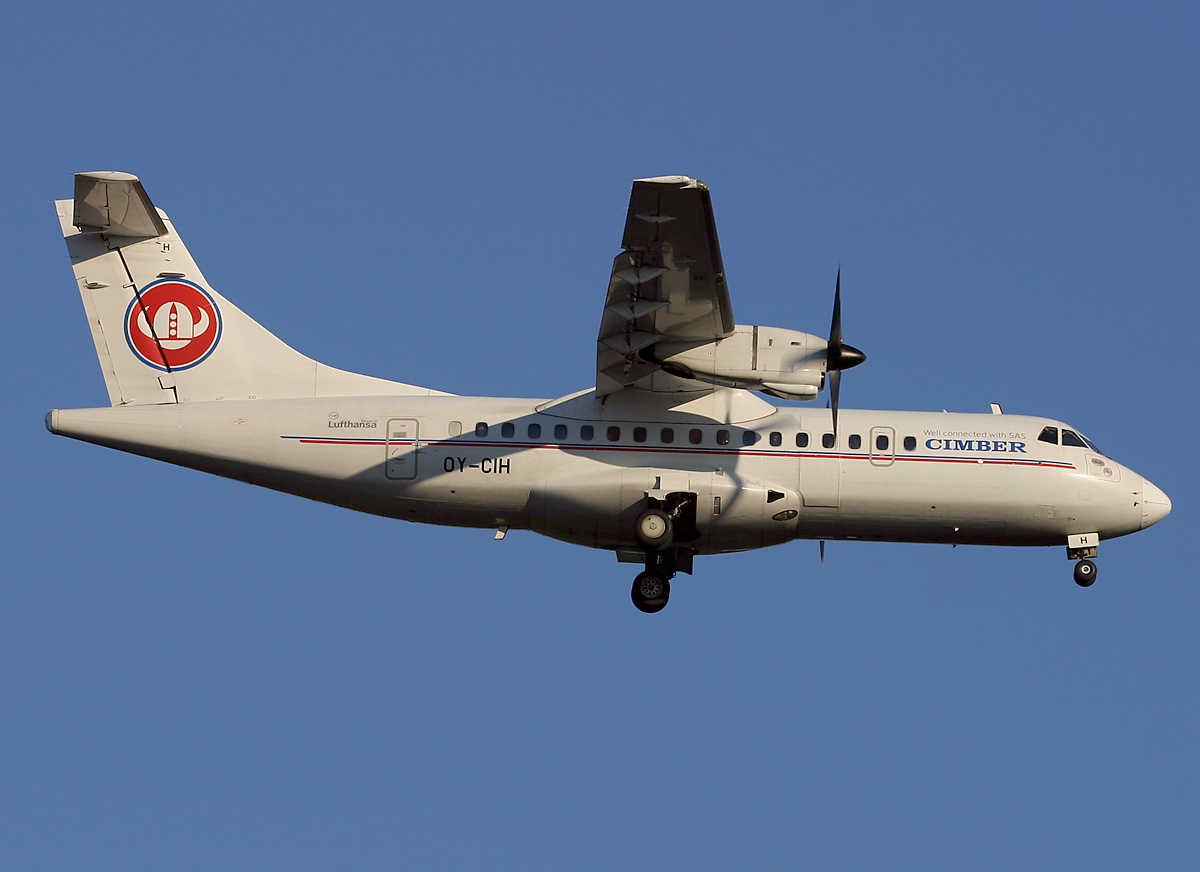
ATR 42-200

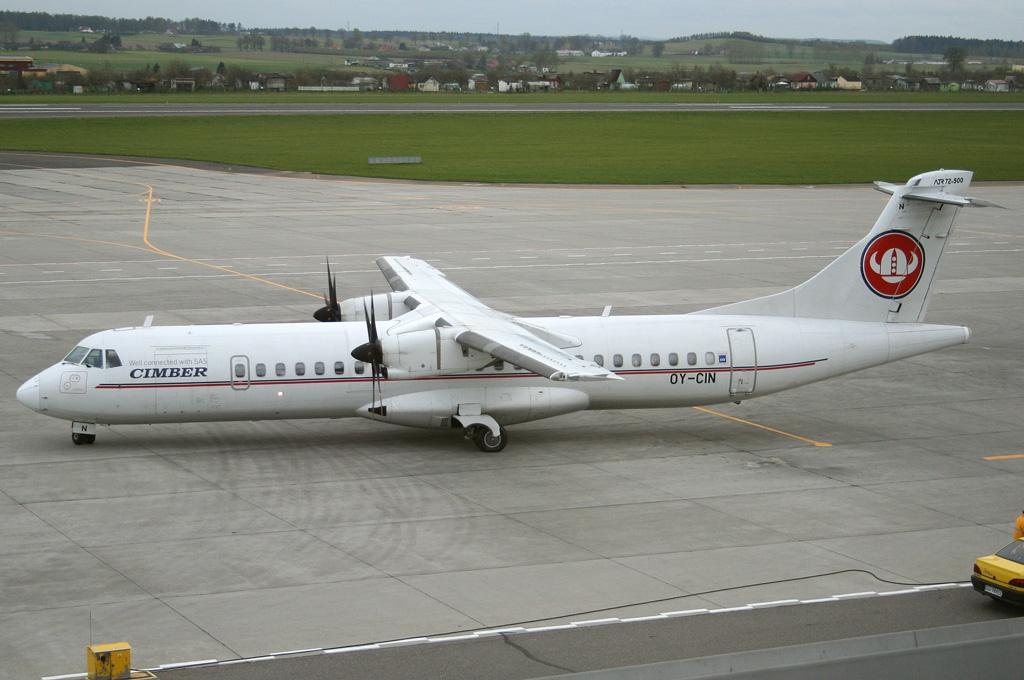
ATR 72-500

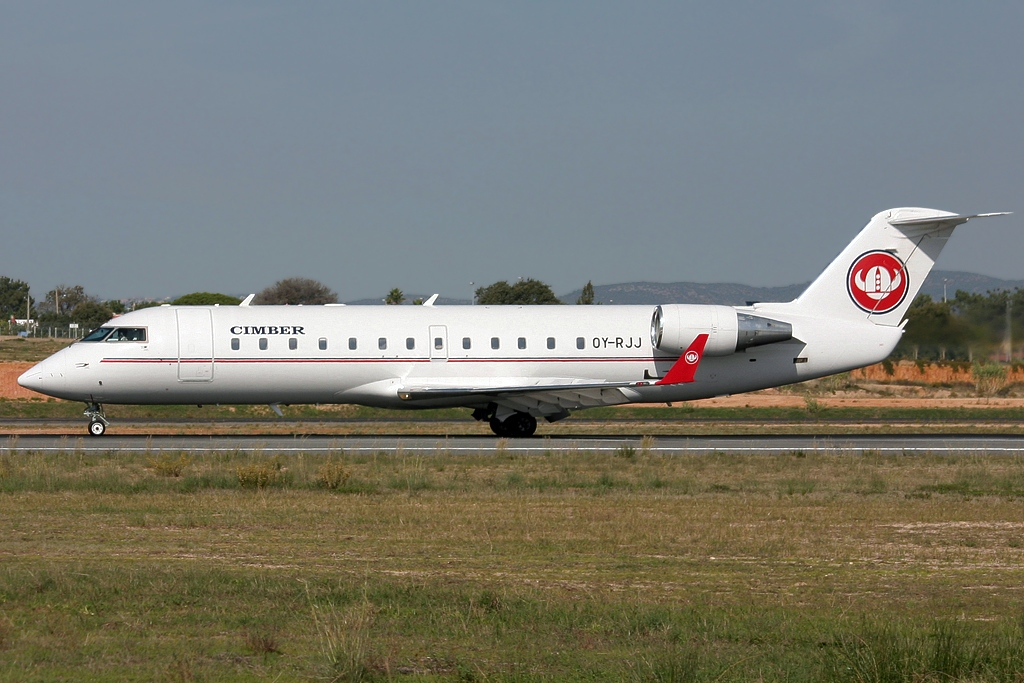
Bombardier CRJ200

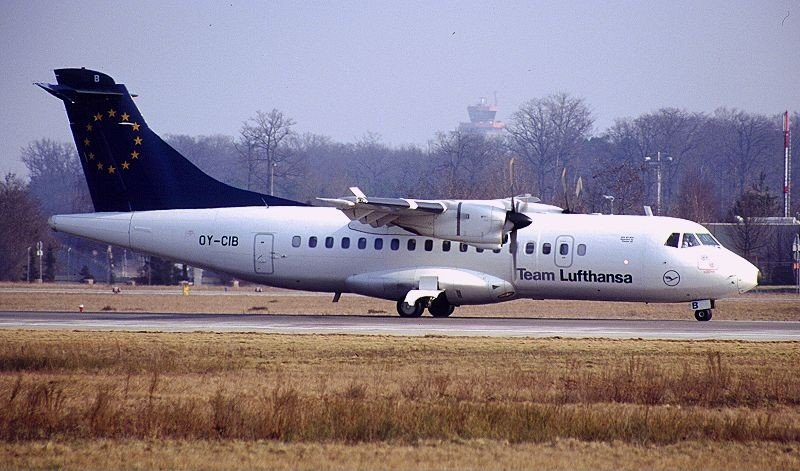
ATR 42-200 in Lufthansa CityLine colors

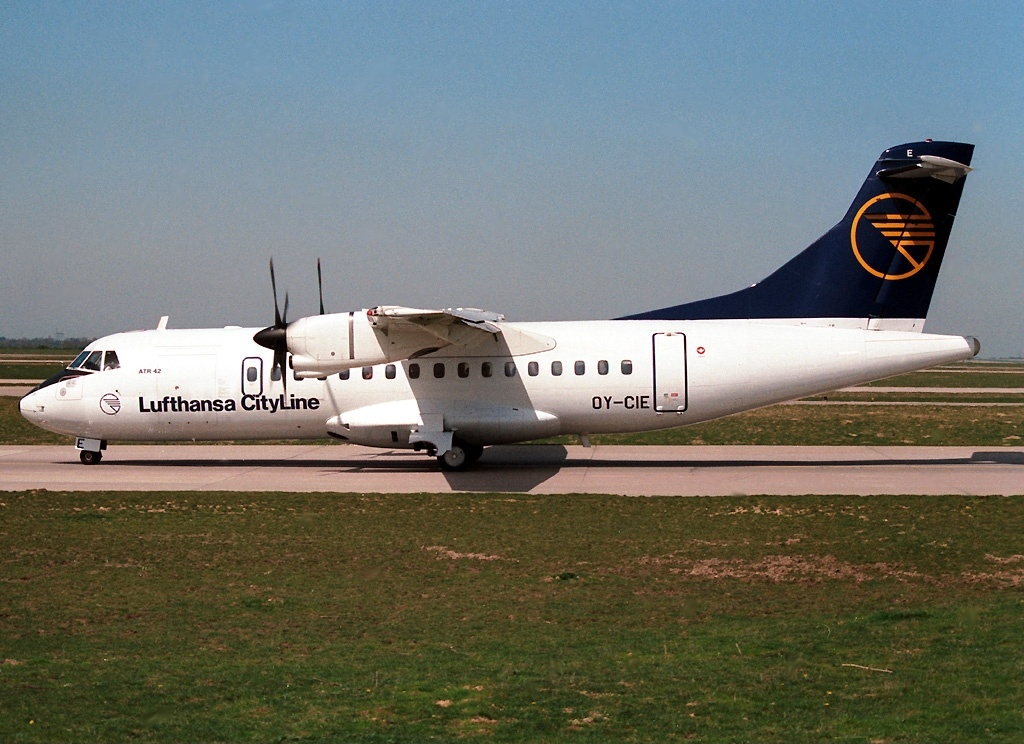
ATR 42-200 in Team Lufthansa colors

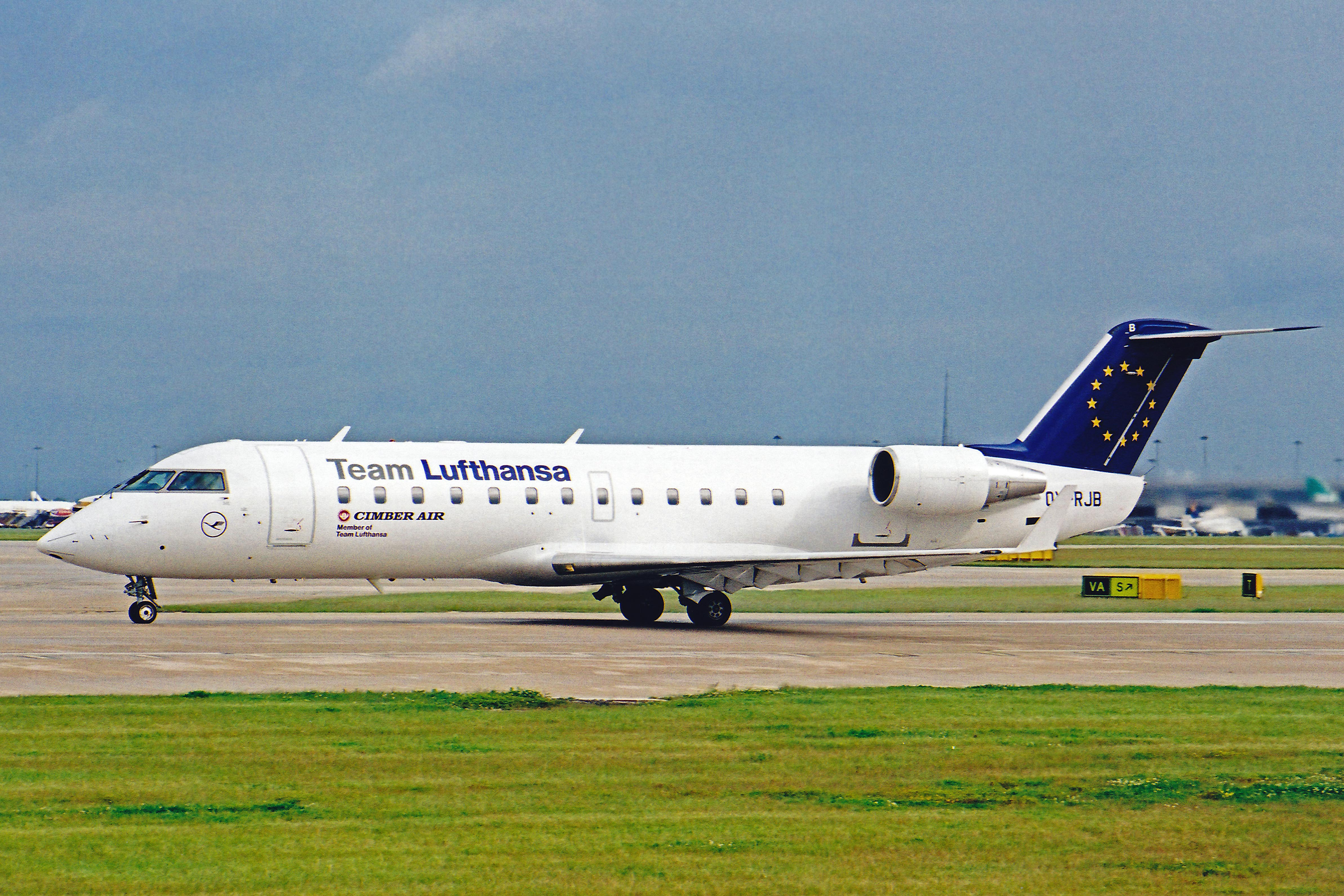
Bombardier CRJ200 in Team Lufthansa colors

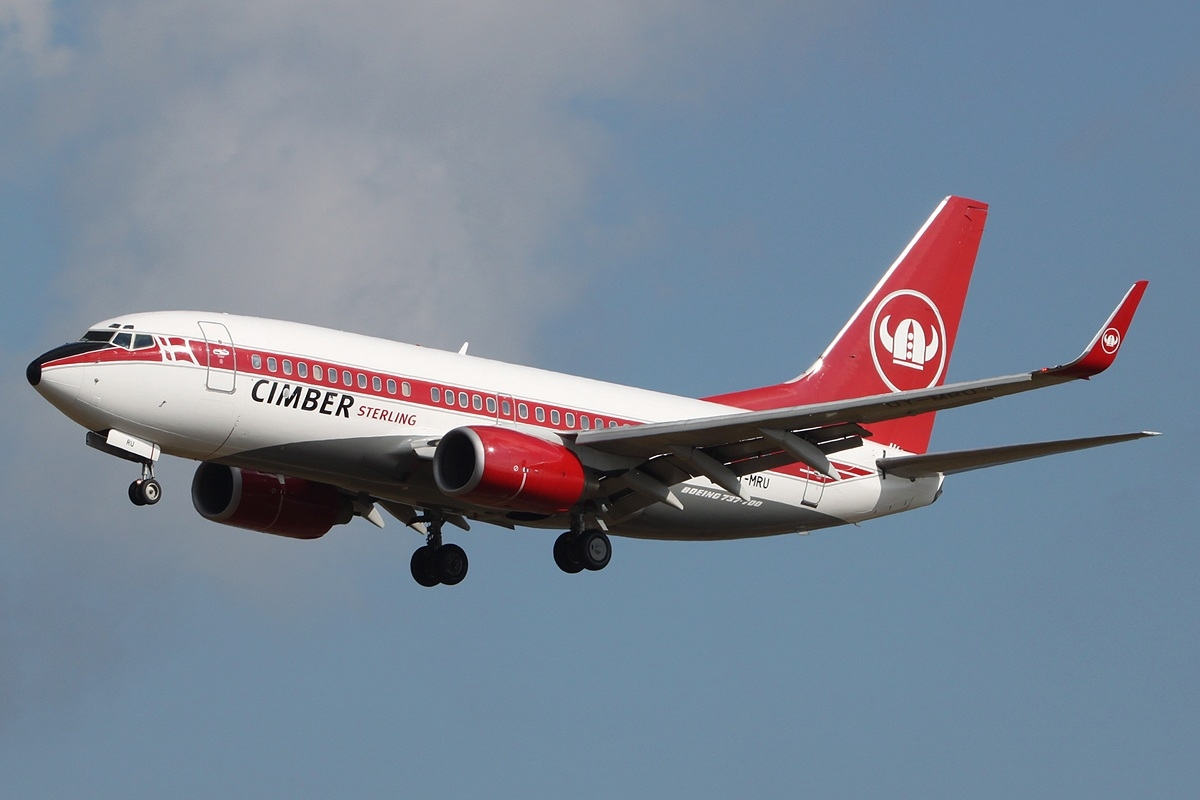
Boeing 737-700
