= Weser Flugzeugbau =

1934–1964 German aircraft manufacturer

Weser Flugzeugbau GmbH
- Trade name: Weserflug / later Weser AG
- Company type: Public
- Industry: Aviation
- Predecessor: Rohrbach Metall-Flugzeugbau
- Founded: Berlin, Germany (1934)
- Defunct: 1964
- Fate: merged with Focke-Wulf
- Successor: Vereinigte Flugtechnische Werke
- Headquarters: Bremen, Germany
- Number of locations: Berlin, Tempelhof Airport
- Products: Aircraft
- Parent: Deutsche Schiff- und Maschinenbau AG (DESCHIMAG)

Weser Flugzeugbau GmbH, known as Weserflug, was an aircraft manufacturing company in Germany.

== History ==
The company was founded in 1934 as a subsidiary of the ship and machine company Deutsche Schiff- und Maschinenbau AG (DESCHIMAG). It began production that year at Berlin Tempelhof, and in Bremen.

In 1935, Dr. Adolf Rohrbach became technical director of a new Weserflug factory at Lemwerder, near Bremen, which opened in 1936. He had been working on ideas for VTOL (Vertical TakeOff and Landing) aircraft since 1933, and now developed them further.

In 1938, the company developed the Weserflug P.1003, a VTOL aircraft. It had 4 m diameter propellers that swivelled between horizontal and vertical, and could fly up to 650 km/h. It requires very complex gearing to tilt the wings without varying the power to the propellers, and therefore was never built.

=== World War II ===
During World War II Weserflug had another factory in Liegnitz. It built Ju 188 and Ju 388 bombers, one of which survives in the National Air and Space Museum in Washington, DC.

Perhaps foreseeing the end of the war, the management of Weserflug transferred in 1944 from Berlin to Hoykenkamp, 15 km west of Bremen. It took over buildings previously used by Focke Achgelis.

During 1940-5, Weserflug built 5215 Junkers Ju 87 Stuka planes at Tempelhof. This plant also constructed Fw 190 fighters. Forced labour was used; on 20 April 1944 2,103 of the 4,151 Tempelhof workers were foreign forced labourers.

Ju 86 aircraft were manufactured at Lemwerder.

=== After the war ===
At the end of the war, all aircraft production in Germany halted for several years. In 1948 a trustee, Horst Janson, was appointed to collect the assets of Weser AG, to which Weserflug belonged. He was responsible for some postwar reindustrialization in Bremen, such as reactivating the shipbuilding industry, and joined the board of Weser AG. Production of motorized aircraft was forbidden in Germany from 1945 until 1955. In the 1950s the Hoykenkamp area was used for small businesses.

In 1960, while retaining his other commitments to the reindustrialisation of Bremen, Janson became chairman of Weser AG. In 1961, Weserflug joined forces with Focke-Wulf - also of Bremen - and Hamburger Flugzeugbau in the Entwicklungsring Nord (ERNO) to develop rockets. Focke-Wulf and Weserflug formally merged in 1964, becoming Vereinigte Flugtechnische Werke (VFW). Janson retired as chairman of Weser AG in 1969.

== Aircraft ==
- Weserflug We 271
- Weserflug WP 1003

== See also ==
- Volksflugzeug
