= Amendola Air Base =

Amendola Air Base
- Part of Italian Air Force; Aeronautica Militare
- Province of Foggia, Italy
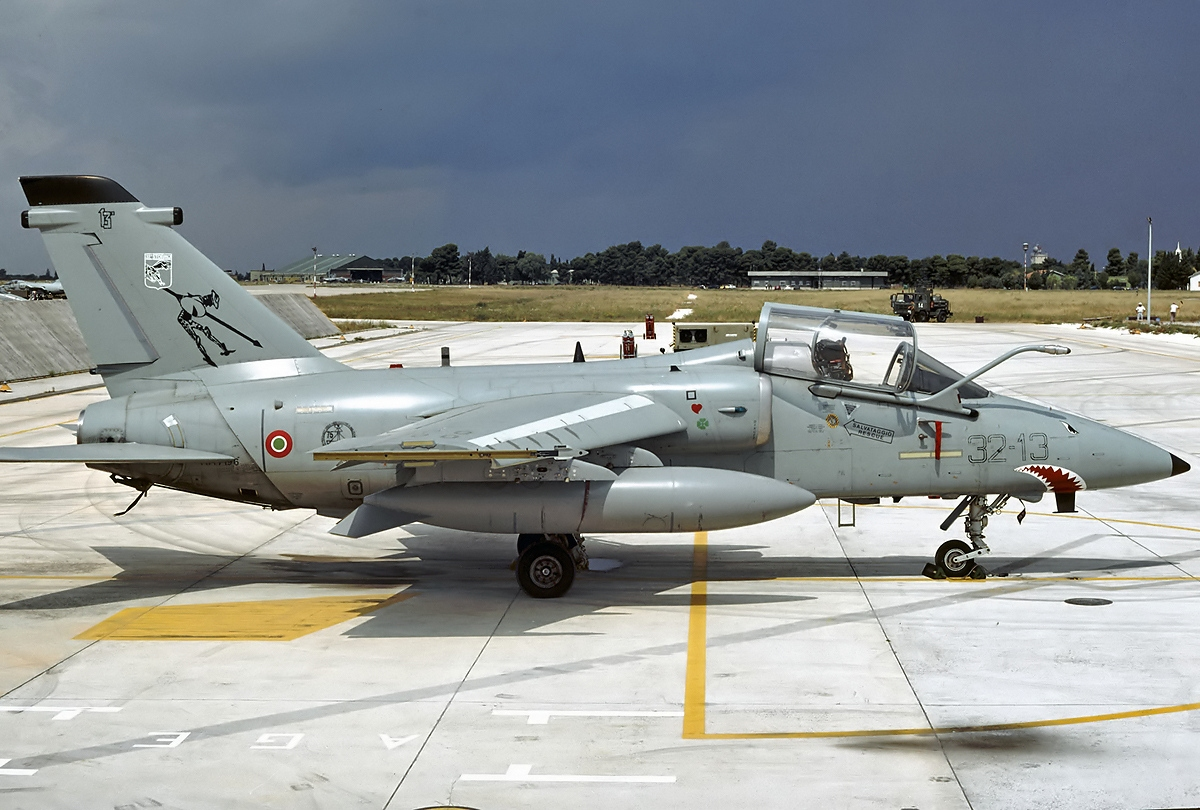
- Alenia/Aermacchi/Embraer AMX at Amendola Air Base

Site information
- Type: Military airfield
- Controlled by: Italian Air Force

Location
- Location of Amendola Air Base, Italy
- Coordinates: 41°32′29″N 015°43′05″E

Site history
- Built: 1941
- In use: 1941–1945; 1947–present
- Battles/wars: World War II

Airfield information
- IATA: none; ICAO: LIBA

Summary
- Elevation AMSL: 182 ft (55 m)
- Interactive map of Airfield information

Runways
Direction	Length		Surface
Direction	ft	m	Surface
11/29	8,727	2,660	Asphalt

Amendola Air Base (ICAO: LIBA) is a military airfield of the Italian Air Force (Aeronautica Militare). It is the home of 32nd Wing.

== Overview ==
Amendola Air Base was primarily a training base for pilots of the AMX International AMX ground attack aircraft and the main base for Italian Air Force AMX pilots. It is now the main base for the Italian F-35 Lighting program.

The 28th Group operates the training centre for Italian Air Force MQ-1C Predator and MQ-9A Reaper UAVs. The 632d Squadron provides connections through the aircraft supplied (MB339) training, flight personnel under the 28th Group in order to ensure adequate training level on traditional piloted aircraft.

Aircraft assigned to Amendola Air Base include the following:

- 13º Gruppo FBA (13th Fighter-Bomber Squadron) operating Lockheed Martin F-35A Lightning IIs
- 28º Gruppo UAV (28th Unmanned Aerial Vehicle Squadron) operating 5 × RQ-1A Predator
- 432º Gruppo STO (432nd Technical Support Squadron)
- 532º Gruppo SLO (532nd Logistic Support Squadron)
- 932º Gruppo Efficienza Aeromobili (932nd (F-35A Lightning II) Maintenance Squadron)
- 632ª Squadriglia Collegamenti (632nd SAR and Communication Flight)

Amendola was also used operationally by NATO forces in 2011 as part of Operation Odyssey Dawn and Operation Unified Protector.

== History ==
=== World War II ===
Amendola Airfield was a pre-war Royal Italian Air Force (Regia Aeronautica) facility, built about 1931. With the surrender of Italy to the Allies on 3 September 1943, the German Luftwaffe quickly seized control of the airfield upon hearing of Italy's capitulation, and briefly used it as a combat airfield. However, Allied forces seized control of the Tavoliere plain in late September/October and occupied the airfield.

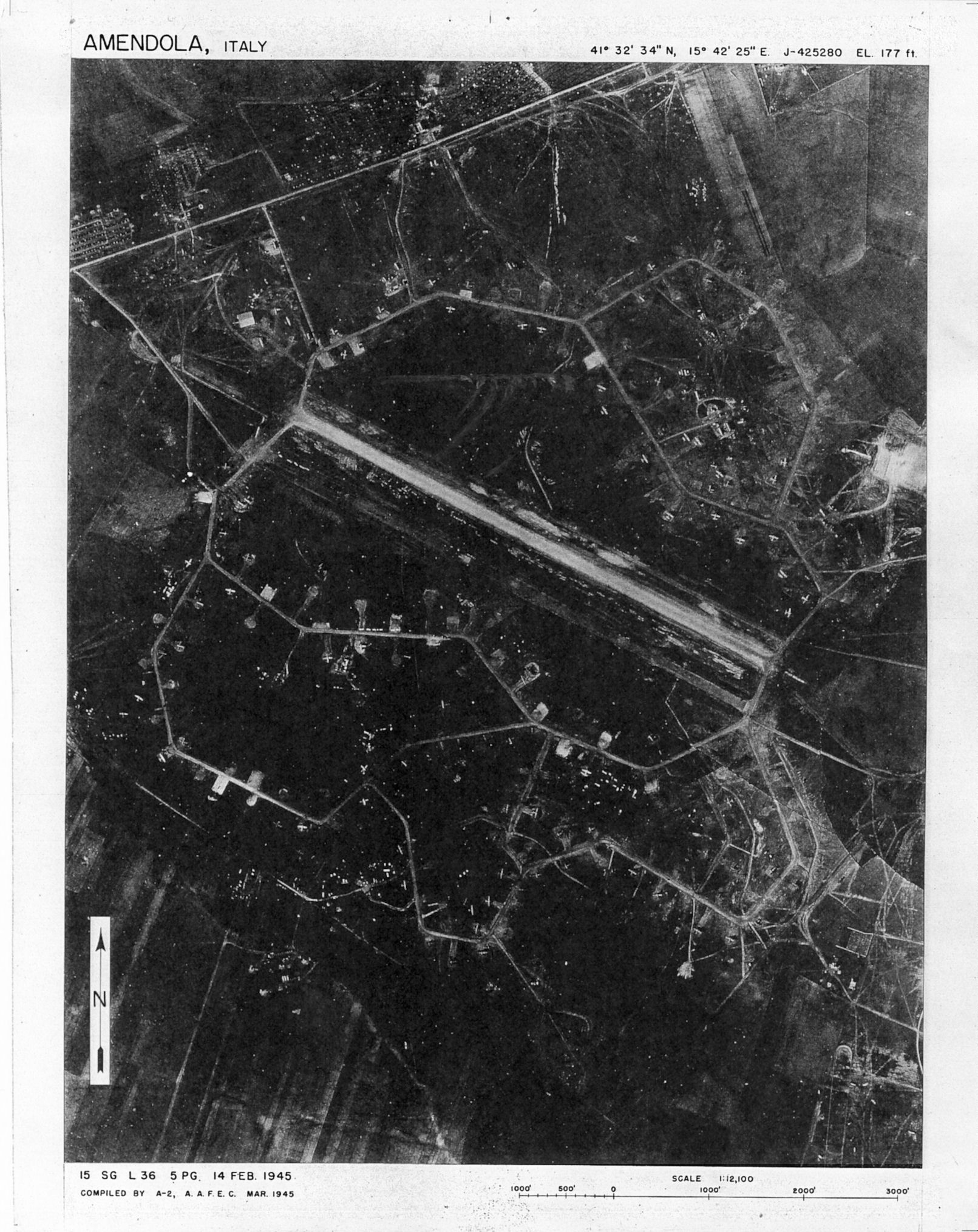
Amendola Airfield in 1945

The United States Army Corps of Engineers eventually rebuilt the facility into a heavy bomber-capable airfield, to be used by bomber groups assigned to USAAF Fifteenth Air Force. It had two 6,000' x 100' runways laid over pierced steel planking, oriented 11/29. There were two perimeter tracks, and several other loop taxiways each containing about 100 aircraft parking hardstands, both of the double loop for bombers and single frying pan type for fighters. There may have been some temporary hangars and buildings; however, most personnel were quartered primarily in tents, and most aircraft maintenance took place in the open on hardstands. It also had a steel control tower.

Operationally, Amendola became one of the largest USAAF airfields in Italy. Its first use was by the Twelfth Air Force 57th Fighter Group, which operated three P-40 Warhawk fighter-bomber squadrons from 27 October 1943. A second Twelfth Air Force Group, the 321st Bombardment Group moved in on 20 November 1943 with four B-25 Mitchell squadrons.

In December 1943, Amendola was transferred to Fifteenth Air Force, which stationed two B-17 Flying Fortress heavy bombardment Groups. The 321st BG moved out to Vincenzo Airfield and the 57th FG to Cercola Airfield by March 1944. Once the airfield was vacant by 12th AF the 2d Bombardment Group and 97th Bombardment Group moved in from bases in Tunisia.

After being part of the Army of Occupation in Italy after the war, the 2nd Bombardment Group moved to Foggia Airfield in November 1945; the 97th moved to Marcianise Airfield in October, and by the end of 1945, the Americans had placed the airfield into an inactive status.

=== Italian Air Force ===
On 1 February 1947 the vacant Amendola Airfield was turned over to the new Aeronautica Militare. The runway was lengthened for jet aircraft use, and its main mission was to train jet pilots on the de Havilland Vampire DH.113 and Lockheed T-33 Shooting Star. In 1953, night fighter training commenced with the de Havilland DH.113s.

The Fiat G.91 arrived in 1954 which was used for almost 30 years for advanced pilot training.

Not only training squadrons operated from Amendola. 32 Squadron (32 Stormo) arrived at the airfield in 1993 for operational use. It flew the twin-engine Fiat G.91Y. By 1995, all G.91 were retired and replaced by the modern AMX. With these aircraft, the squadron participated in 1997 and 1999 NATO missions over the former Yugoslavia. During the Kosovo War, Amendola hosted Belgian and Dutch F-16 fighter aircraft. In 2002, the Italian Air Force received their first MQ-1 Predator drones, which later together with the AMX fighter aircraft, were used in Afghanistan. In preparation for the introduction of Lockheed Martin F-35 one of two AMX squadrons stationed here (13 Gruppo) was dissolved in December 2013 and reestablished with F-35s. On 12 December 2016 Amendola received the first two operational ItAF F-35As, marking the first combat unit operational with this model outside the US.

== See also ==
- Boeing B-17 Flying Fortress airfields in the Mediterranean Theater of Operations
