= Thunder City =

Aircraft maintenance company in Cape Town

Coordinates: 33.982738°S 18.601786°E

Thunder City Holdings
- Type: Private
- Industry: Aerospace
- Founded: Cape Town, South Africa (1998-05-07)
- Headquarters: Cape Town, South Africa
- Key people: Owner/Founder Mike Beachy Head; CEO Emilio Titus

Thunder City was an aircraft operating and maintenance company based at the Cape Town International Airport in Cape Town, South Africa. It was well known for owning the largest civilian collection of former military jet aircraft in the world. These aircraft were used to perform in airshows and could also be chartered by the general public for recreational flights, including going supersonic and climbing to altitudes around 50,000 feet. Following a fatal accident in 2009 in which an English Electric Lightning crashed at an airshow, the company ceased flying operations after the accident investigation found major shortcomings in its maintenance programme.

The company's other activities included upgrading older models of the Aerospatiale Puma helicopter with modern avionics and renovating airframes and engines.

== Company structure ==
Thunder City Holdings (Pty) Ltd. is the parent company of several subsidiaries:

- Thunder City Aircraft Company
- Thunder City Aircraft Maintenance Company
- Thunder City Education
- Thunder City Aircraft Entertainment
- Thunder City Flying Company
- Thunder City Property Company

== Fleet ==
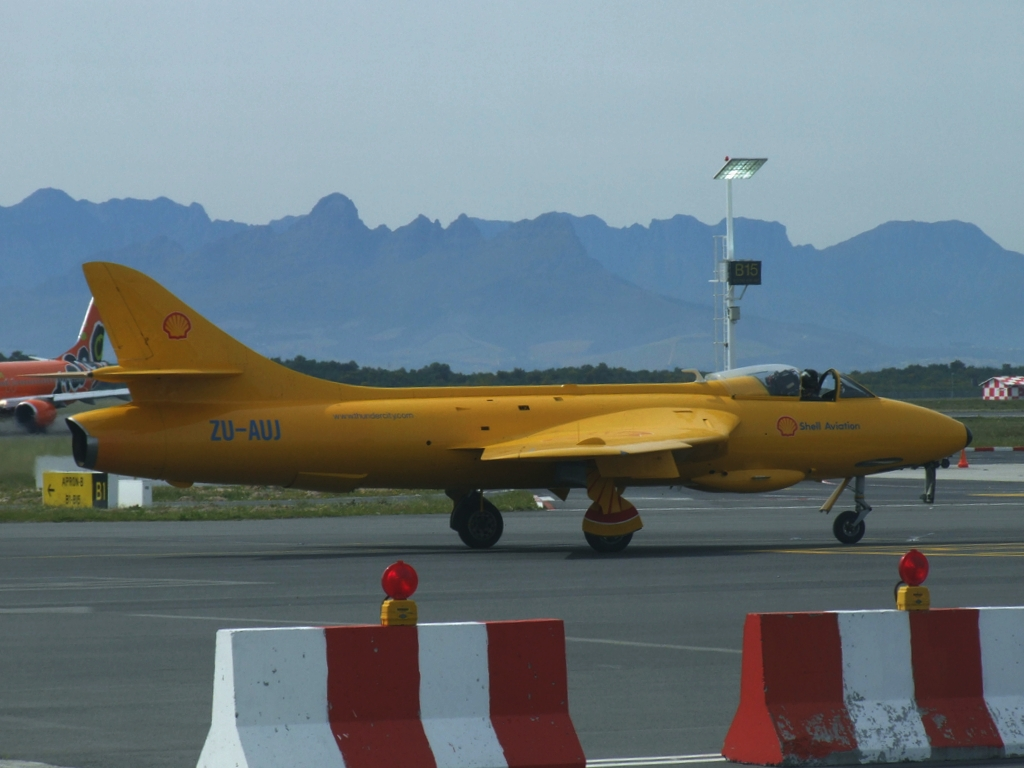
A Thunder City Hawker Hunter in 2006

Some of the aircraft are the most recently airworthy examples of the type.

- Three English Electric Lightning. One T5 was lost in an accident on 14 November 2009.
- Three Blackburn Buccaneers.
- Seven Hawker Hunters.
- One Aerospatiale Puma, a demonstrator of the company's upgrade and refurbishment services.
- One Gloster Javelin FAW Mk.1 (RAF No. XA553). Mounted as a "Gate Guard" on display at the entrance to the company premises.

In October 2012, three Lightnings, three Buccaneers and four Hawker Hunters were put up for sale.

== AAD 2008 controversy ==
During a display flight at the 2008 African Aerospace and Defence (AAD) show in Cape Town a pair of Thunder City Lightnings flew close to the city at supersonic speed. Only the higher one of the pair was planned to fly supersonic as it was considered to be high enough so as not to cause alarm, however the lower aircraft also broke the sound barrier. The resulting sonic boom brought many complaints from the public.

== 2009 Lightning crash ==
An English Electric Lightning T5, ZU-BEX, (RAF No. XS451) crashed while carrying out a display at the biennial South African Air Force Overberg Airshow held at AFB Overberg near Bredasdorp on 14 November 2009.

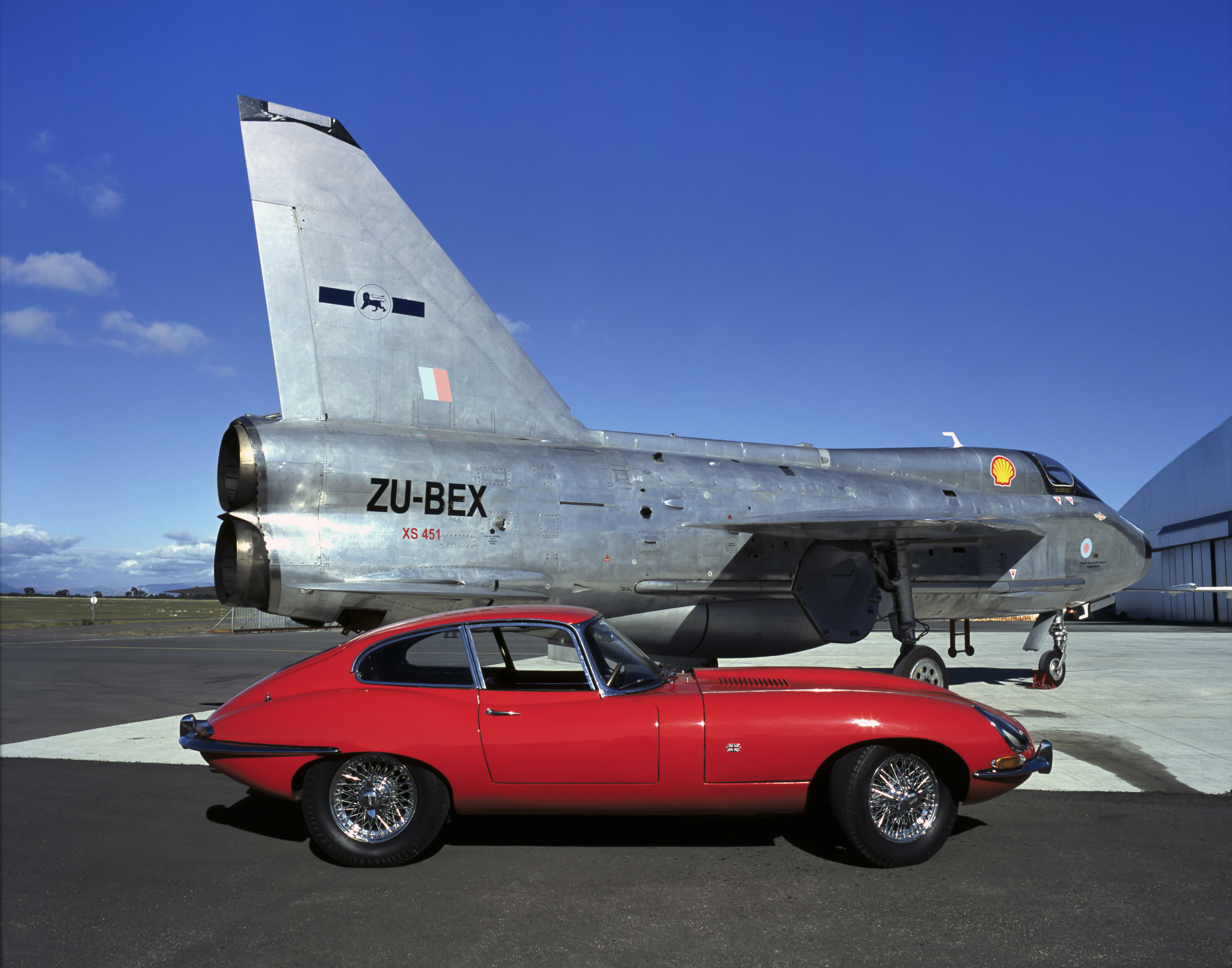
ZU-BEX in 2002

The aircraft suffered hydraulic failure after a fire started in the rear of the fuselage. (Note: The fire was caused by a fuel leak in the pipework supplying one of the aft-mounted reheat units. This leaked fuel pooled in the lower rear fuselage before the accident flight, being ignited by the reheat used during take-off. The resulting internal fire then burnt through the tailplane PFCU (Powered Flying Control Unit) hydraulic supply lines leading to a total loss of elevator control.) The pilot was killed because his ejection seat failed to operate due to the canopy not jettisoning. (Note: The Martin-Baker Mk.4 ejection seat was inhibited from operating due to the canopy failing to jettison. This failure was found to be due to internal corrosion within some piping leading to the rupture under pressure of the line supplying high-pressure gas to the left canopy securing latch during canopy jettisoning, leaving the latch still engaged - normal release of both latches at the front of the canopy during jettisoning allows the airflow to flip the canopy up and away from the aircraft which then permits automatic activation of the seat firing mechanism. The canopy could also be manually jettisoned but investigators assume the pilot did not have the time to do so due to the low altitude at which the accident occurred. In the case of an unsuccessful automatic canopy jettison, the seat ejection system is designed to automatically fire the seat ejection gun as soon as the canopy has been successfully jettisoned manually. Although several of the ejection gun cartridges examined at Thunder City by investigators were past their 'expiry date', there is no reason to suppose they would not still have operated normally when and if they were actuated.)

The accident investigation found major shortcomings in the maintenance program of the aircraft, consequently the South African Civil Aviation Authority suspended the company's operating certificate in March 2010. On 9 September 2010, it was reported that the Thunder City fleet would no longer take paying passengers.

On 22 August 2011 three Lightnings, three Buccaneers and four Hunters were listed as "for sale by private treaty" with Go Industry. The closing date for bids was 27 April 2012. The first time Thunder City participated in an airshow since the 2009 crash was on 21 April 2012 at the AFB Overberg airshow.

A set of Lightning tyres were sold by Thunder City to the Bloodhound SSC Project in August 2012.

== Death of Mike Beachy Head and sale of the remaining collection ==
Mike Beachy Head, the owner of Thunder City, died suddenly of a heart attack at the age of 59 on 21st May 2017. The remaining aircraft collection was subsequently moved outdoors by the Landlord of the Thunder City Hangar in Cape Town.

At the end of 2021, Jay Smith, an ex oil entrepreneur with a passion for fast jets and head of South African aircraft maintenance company Hangar 51, bought the remains of the Thunder City collection from Mike Beachy Head's estate. Various aircraft from the collection have since been moved and are undergoing restoration.
