= 32nd Wing (Italy) =

32nd Wing "Armando Boetto"
- 32° Stormo "Armando Boetto"
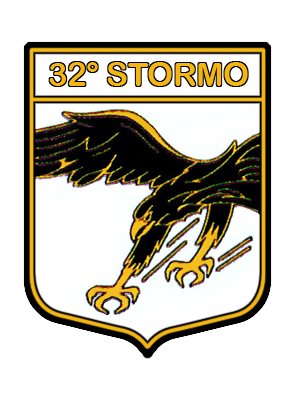
- Wing patch
- Active: 1937-1943, 1967-present
- Country: Kingdom of Italy; Italy
- Branch: Italian Air Force
- Type: Air attack ISTAR
- Size: Wing
- Part of: Combat Forces Command
- Airport: Amendola Air Base
- Engagements: World War II: Battaglia di Mezzo Agosto
- Decorations: Silver Medal of Military Valor

Commanders
- Current commander: Colonel Roberto Massarotto

Aircraft flown
- Attack: Lockheed Martin F-35 Lightning II
- Reconnaissance: General Atomics MQ-1C Gray Eagle; General Atomics MQ-9 Reaper

The 32nd Wing "Armando Boetto" (Italian: 32° Stormo "Armando Boetto") is a military aviation unit of the Italian Air Force, equipped with both attack aircraft (F-35A) and unmanned aerial vehicles for ISTAR missions (Predator MQ-1C and MQ-9A Reaper).

== History ==
The 32nd Wing has a two-pronged history: a period in preparation and during the World War II, and a period during and after the Cold War.

=== 1937-1943: Italian Royal Air Force ===
Ensign of the 32º Stormo B.T. of the Italian Air Force

The 32nd Wing was established on 1 December 1936 at the airport of Cagliari Elmas. The 32nd Wing was labelled as "Land Bombing" (Bombardamento Terrestre, B.T.). It had two Flying Squadrons: the 38th Squadron (49th and 50th Flights) in Aviano and the 89th Squadron (228th e 229th Flights) in Forlì.

On 24 February 1937 the Wing was reunited in Elmas. The following 3 April 1937 the War Flag was solemnly granted to the Wing; the first commander was Lieutenant Colonel Vincenzo Napoli. In 1938 the 89th Squadron was moved to Alghero, but it was moved back the following year. In 1937 the 32nd Wing was equipped with the three-engine bomber/transport aircraft Savoia-Marchetti SM.81; in 1939, the Wing adopted the three-engine medium bomber Savoia-Marchetti SM.79.

On 3 June 1940 the 32nd Wing was deployed in Decimomannu; the unit saw action on 12 June 1940 in an attack on Biserta. On 9 July the 32nd Wing participated to the First Battle of the Balearic against the Mediterranean Fleet, damaging HMS Hood, HMS Ark Royal, and two cruisers. The Wing's War Flag was awarded the Silver Medal of Military Valor for this action. In August 1940 the 32nd Wing received some Savoia Marchetti SM.82 long-range heavy bombers, based in Cagliari-Decimomannu.

Main war actions include attacks on Gibraltar where, on 8 May 1941, died Captain Armando Boetto, commander of the 49th Flight, to which the 32nd Wing is dedicated. Captain Armando Boetto's memory was awarded a Gold Medal of Military Valor. After this period, the 32nd Wing was renamed as 32nd Torpedo-bomber Wing and in late 1941 received first exemplars of Savoia-Marchetti SM.84.

In May 1942 the 32nd Wing was moved to Gioia del Colle Air Base, then in Villacidro, and eventually in Lecce.

On 10 January 1943, the 32nd Wing was moved to Lecce; the 89th Squadron became an Autonomous unit under Air Force Sardinia. The 89th Squadron was replaced the 43rd Fighting Squadron (3rd and 5th Flights), equipped with Caproni Ca.314. On 27 January 1943, the 32nd Wing was disbanded and its Squadrons became autonomous.

=== 1967-present: Italian Air Force ===
The 32nd Wing was reestablished on 10 September 1967 in Brindisi, with the role of fighter-bomber and reconnaissance. The 32nd Wing consisted of the 13th Squadron Fighters-Bombers-Reconnaissance (CBR in Italian acronym) with 76th, 77th, and 78th Flights. In this configuration, the Wing had the Fiat G.91R jet-fighters; in 1974, they were replaced by Fiat G.91Y aircraft.

On 1 July 1993, the 32nd Wing was moved in Amendola; the Wing included: 13th Squadron CBR, 201st Squadron OCU (operational conversion unit), and 204th Squadron (with Fiat G.91Ts).

On 31 July 1995, the 101st Squadron OCU was organically assigned to the 32nd Wing, while the 201st Squadron OCU was transformed into a cadre unit. On 5 September 1995, also the 204th Squadron was transformed into a cadre unit. On 30 September 1995 the Fiat G.91T was radiated and the Wing received AMX "Ghibli" and AMX-T aircraft.

The 32nd Wing had taken part to "Deliberate Guard" Operation to maintain the peace in Bosnia since 9 December 1997. Since the late 1990s, the 32nd Wing has provided security to Rome airspace during major events and support for police and rescue operations. In 1999 the 32nd Wing was dedicated to Pilot Captain Armando Boetto.

On 1 March 2002, the Unmanned Aerial Vehicles Squadron was established under the 32nd Wing, with Predator-A UAVs. On 1 February 2005 the Squadron was renamed as 28th Squadron "Le Streghe", after the 3rd Wing in Villafranca was disestablished. The 28th Squadron took part to all major Italian Ait Force operations abroad since 2005: Operation Antica Babilonia in Iraq, Unified Protector in Libya and NATO Joint Enterprise in Kosovo. In 2009 the 32nd Wing provided air security to the 2009 35th G8 summit held in L'Aquila and to the Extraordinary Jubilee of Mercy. In Afghanistan the 32nd Wing sent two task-groups: in 2007 with Predator UAVs (Task Group "Astore") and in 2009 with AMXs (Task Group "Black Cats").

Since 2013, the 32nd Wing provided aerial maritime surveillance within "Mare Nostrum”, “Mare Sicuro”, “EU Navfor Med” and "EUNAVFOR Atalanta” operations. In 2014, Predator UAVs have been sent in Iraq against ISIS ("Inherent Resolve"); in the same year, the 32nd Wing deployed some of its forces to Sigonella.

From December 2013 to 12 May 2016 the 13th Flying Squadron was converted into a cadre unit. In July 2014 the 101st Squadron OCU was moved under the 51st Wing in Istrana. On 12 December 2016, the 32nd Wing received the Lockheed Martin F-35 Lightning II, being the first air unit in Europe to receive the aircraft.

== Organization ==
As of 1 July 2025 the 32nd Wing consists of the following units:

- 32° Stormo "Armando Boetto", at Amendola Air Base
  - 13th Squadron — F-35A Lightning II
  - 28th UAV Squadron — MQ-9A Predator B
  - 101st Squadron — F-35B Lightning II
  - 432nd Technical Services Squadron
  - 532nd Logistic Services Squadron
  - 932nd Maintenance Squadron
  - 632nd Liaison Flight — MB-339A and MB-339CDII for UAV-pilot training
  - Force Protection Squadron
  - Aeronautical Detachment Jacotenente

== Coat of arms ==
When the 32nd Wing was established in 1936, the unit's insignia depicted a mosquito launching a grenade. Nowadays the coat of arms features a dark eagle with downward talons, ready to hit the prey.
