= Aeritalia =

Italian aerospace engineering corporation

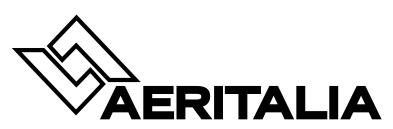
- Industry: Aerospace
- Predecessor: Aerfer; Fiat Aviazione
- Founded: 1969; 57 years ago
- Defunct: 1990; 36 years ago
- Fate: Merged with Selenia
- Successor: Alenia Aeronautica
- Headquarters: Italy
- Area served: Worldwide

Aeritalia was an aerospace engineering corporation based in Italy. It was formed out of the merger of two aviation companies, Fiat Aviazione and Aerfer, in 1969.

Aeritalia continued several programs of its preceding companies, perhaps most prominently the Fiat G.222 transport aircraft. Furthermore, the company was involved in various multinational programs and initiatives, including the European multirole aircraft Panavia Tornado, the ATR family of regional airliners, and the fighter-bomber AMX International AMX. Aeritalia was also a partner in the Boeing 767 from its inception, and played a key role in the creation of the Italian space industry, being involved in the Alfa rocket. In 1990, Aeritalia and Selenia were merged at the behest of parent corporation Finmeccanica to create Alenia Aeronautica, an aerospace and defense specialist.

== History ==
Aeritalia was created during 1969 by the merger of Aerfer and Fiat Aviazione's aviation businesses.

In response to a NATO-issued specification for a V/STOL transport aircraft (NATO Basic Military Requirement 4), Fiat's design team, led by Giuseppe Gabrielli, produced a design to meet this requirement, designated G.222. According to Aeritalia, the G.222 designation is derived from the first letter of the aircraft's chief designer; the first '2' referring to the twin-engine arrangement, and the final '22' referring to the revised NATO Basic Military Requirement 22 to which it had been submitted. The Italian Air Force (AMI), who sought a replacement for the Fairchild C-119 Flying Boxcar, felt that the G.222 proposal had merit and placed an order for two prototypes and a ground-test airframe in 1968. It was substantially redeveloped from the NATO submission, the V/STOL lift engines were omitted and a pair of General Electric T64 turboprop engines were adopted; subsequently, the G.222 lacked a V/STOL capability but retained considerable short take-off/landing (STOL) performance.

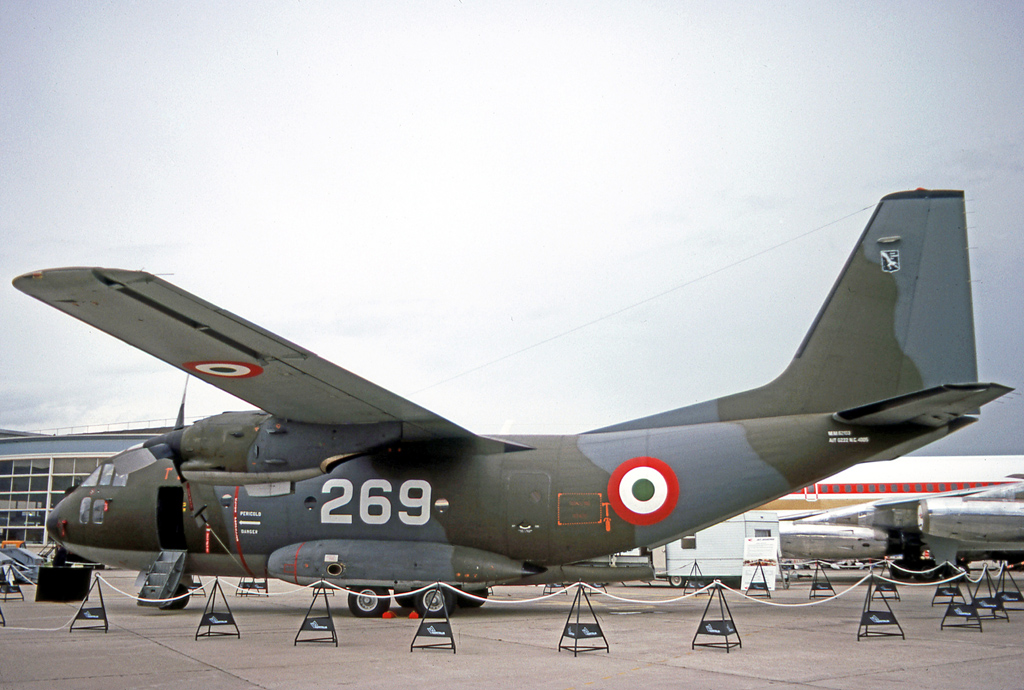
Fiat G.222TCM development aircraft exhibited at the 1977 Paris Air Show.

During December 1971, the Italian Air Force held a formal evaluation of the G.222 which led to a contract for 44 aircraft being issued to Aeritalia. In December 1975, the first production aircraft conducted its first flight. Following on from its introduction by the AMI, the G.222 was procured as a tactical transport aircraft by various international customers, including Argentina, Nigeria, Somalia, Venezuela and Thailand. In December 1978, Aeritalia elected to transfer final assembly of the G.222 from Turin to Naples, at which point a total of 44 firm orders had been obtained for the type and one aircraft per month was being manufactured. Manufacturing of the G.222 was broken down into various companies; construction of the fuselage was performed at Naples, the center-section of the wing was produced by Piaggio, the wing panels were made by Macchi, the tail surfaces were built by SIAI-Marchetti, the engine nacelles by IAM, and the T64 engines were license-manufactured by Alfa Romeo and Fiat.

During early 1977, the Italian Air Force issued a requirement for 187 new-build strike fighters, which were to replace its existing Aeritalia G.91 in the close air support and reconnaissance missions, as well as the Lockheed RF-104G Starfighter also being used in the reconnaissance role. Rather than competing for the contract, Aeritalia and Italian aerospace company Aermacchi agreed to produce a joint proposal for the requirement, as both firms had been considering the development of a similar class of aircraft for some years. In April 1978, work on the joint venture formally commenced. During 1980, the Brazilian government announced that they intended to participate in the program to replace the Aermacchi MB-326. In July 1981, the Italian and Brazilian governments agreed on joint requirements, and Embraer was invited to join the industrial partnership. An agreement was also struck to divide AMX manufacturing between the partners; for each production aircraft, Aeritalia manufactured 46.5 per cent of the components (central fuselage, stabilisers and rudders), Aermacchi produced 22.8 per cent (front fuselage and tail cone), and Embraer performed 29.7 per cent of the work (wing, air intakes, pylons and drop tanks).

During the 1960s and 1970s, European aircraft manufacturers had undergone considerable corporate restructuring, including mergers and consolidations, as well as moved towards collaborative multi-national programmes, such as the newly launched Airbus A300. In line with this trend towards intra-European cooperation, French aerospace company Aérospatiale and Aeritalia commenced discussions on the topic of working together to develop an all-new regional airliner. Prior to this, both companies had been independently conducting studies for their own aircraft concepts, the AS 35 design in the case of Aerospatiale and the AIT 230 for Aeritalia, to conform with demand within this sector of the market as early as 1978.

On 4 November 1981, a formal Cooperation Agreement was signed by Aeritalia chairman Renato Bonifacio and Aerospatiale chairman Jacques Mitterrand in Paris, France. This agreement signaled not only the merger of their efforts, but of their separate concept designs together into a single complete aircraft design for the purpose of pursuing its development and manufacture as a collaborative joint venture. The consortium then targeted a similar unit cost but a 950 lb (430 kg) fuel consumption over a 200 nmi (370 km) sector, nearly half the 1,750 lb (790 kg) required by its 40-50 seat competitors, the British Aerospace HS.748 and Fokker F.27, and planned a 58-seat ATR XX stretch. This agreement served not only as the basis and origins of the ATR company, but also as the effective launch point of what would become the fledgling firm's first aircraft, which was designated as the ATR 42. By 1983, ATR's customer services division has been set up, readying infrastructure worldwide to provide support for ATR's upcoming aircraft to any customer regardless of location.

During 1990, Aeritalia was reorganised by its corporate parent, Finmeccanica; it merged with Selenia to form Alenia Aeronautica, which functioned as Finmeccanica's aerospace division.

== Aircraft ==
- Aeritalia F-104S
- AMX International AMX
- ATR42
- Aeritalia G.91
- Aeritalia G.91Y
- Aeritalia G.222

== Rockets ==
- Alfa (rocket)

== See also ==
- List of Italian companies
