= Martin-Baker Mk.4 =

British ejection seat

Mk.4
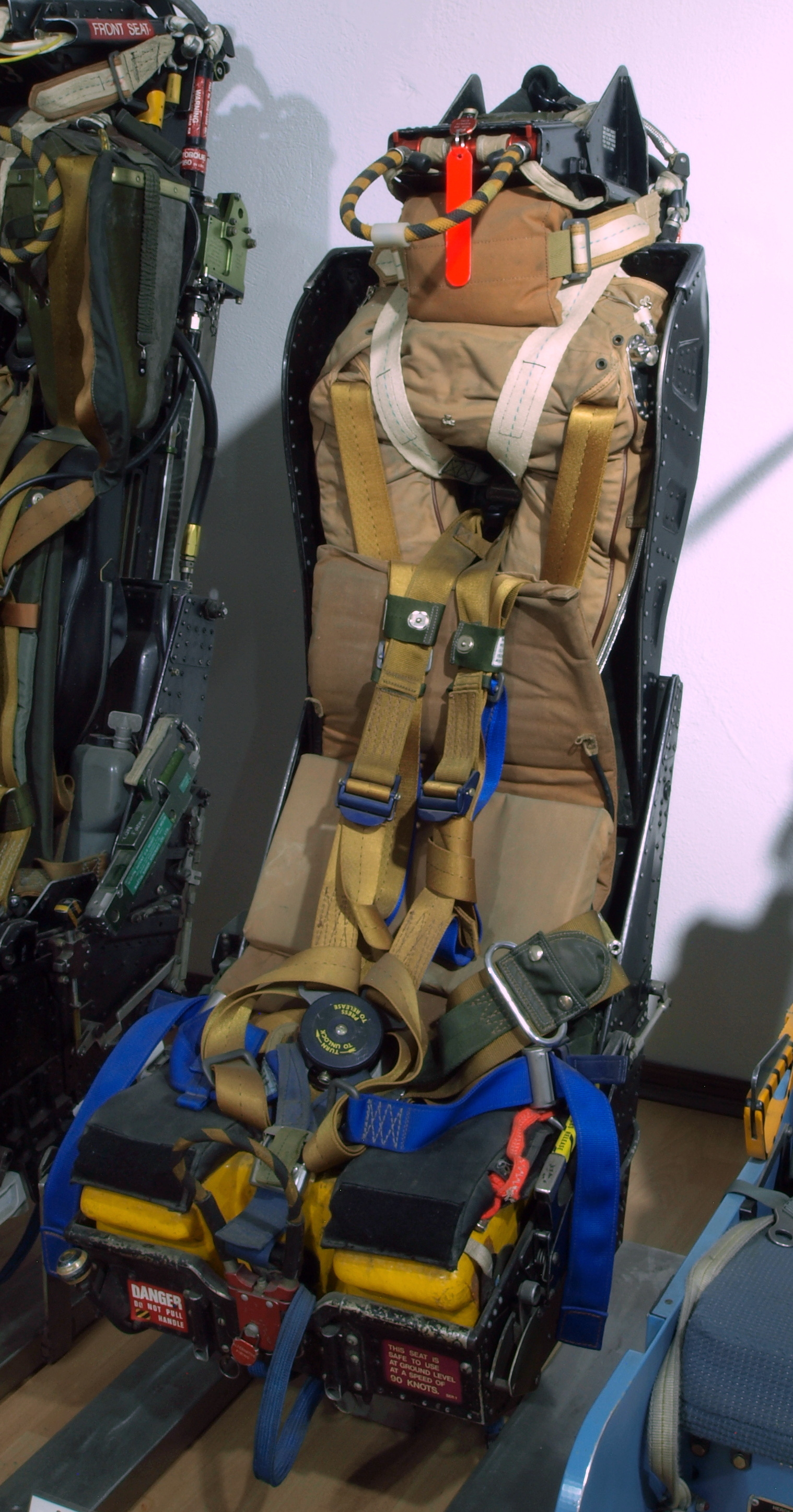
- Martin-Baker Mk.4Q2 on display at the Museum für Luftfahrt und Technik

The Martin-Baker Mk.4 is a British ejection seat designed and built by Martin-Baker. Introduced in the 1950s, the Mk.4 has been installed in combat and training aircraft worldwide.

== History ==
The Mk.4 seat was designed as an improved, lightweight version of earlier Martin-Baker seats for installation in a range of lighter, smaller aircraft types. Improvements included a single combined seat and parachute quick release fastener (QRF) and a snubber mechanism to allow crews to lean forward without loosening the harness. The first successful ejection using a Mk.4 seat took place in March 1957, the aircraft involved being a Fiat G.91.

== Operation sequence ==
Operating either the seat pan or face blind firing handles initiates aircraft canopy jettison, the main gun located at the rear of the seat then fires, the main gun is a telescopic tube with two explosive charges that fire in sequence. As the seat moves up its guide rails an emergency oxygen supply is activated and personal equipment tubing and communication leads are automatically disconnected, leg restraints also operate.

Once the seat is safely clear of the aircraft a steel rod, known as the drogue gun, is fired which extracts two small drogue parachutes to stabilise the seat's descent path. A barostatic mechanism prevents the main parachute from opening above an altitude of 10,000 ft (3,000 m) allowing the seat and pilot to descend rapidly in free fall so conserving the on-seat oxygen supply until normally-breathable atmospheric air becomes available. A time delay mechanism operates the main parachute below this altitude in conjunction with another device to prevent the parachute opening at high speed to prevent possible parachute canopy damage. The seat then separates from the occupant for a normal parachute descent, a manual separation handle and ripcord is provided should the automatic system fail.

== Applications ==
The Mk.4 ejection seat has been installed in over 35 aircraft types including the following:
List from Martin-Baker.

- Aermacchi MB-326
- BAC Strikemaster
- Breguet Taon
- Dassault Étendard IV
- Dassault Mirage III
- Dassault Mystère
- Dassault Ouragan
- Dassault/Dornier Alpha Jet
- de Havilland Vampire
- Dornier Do 29
- English Electric Canberra
- English Electric Lightning
- Fouga CM.170 Magister
- HAL Ajeet
- HAL HF-24 Marut
- HAL Kiran
- Hawker Hunter
- Helwan HA-300
- Nord 1500 Griffon
- Nord Gerfaut
- SEPECAT Jaguar
- SNCASE SE-212 Durandal
- SNCASO Trident
- Sud Aviation Vautour

== Seats on display ==
A Martin-Baker Mk.4P seat is on display at the Royal Air Force Museum Cosford.

== Specifications (Mk.4) ==
- Maximum operating height: 50,000 ft (15,240 m)
- Minimum operating height: Ground level
- Minimum operating speed: 90 knots indicated airspeed (KIAS)
- Maximum operating speed: 600 KIAS
