= Fiat G.91 =

Italian jet fighter-bomber aircraft

G.91
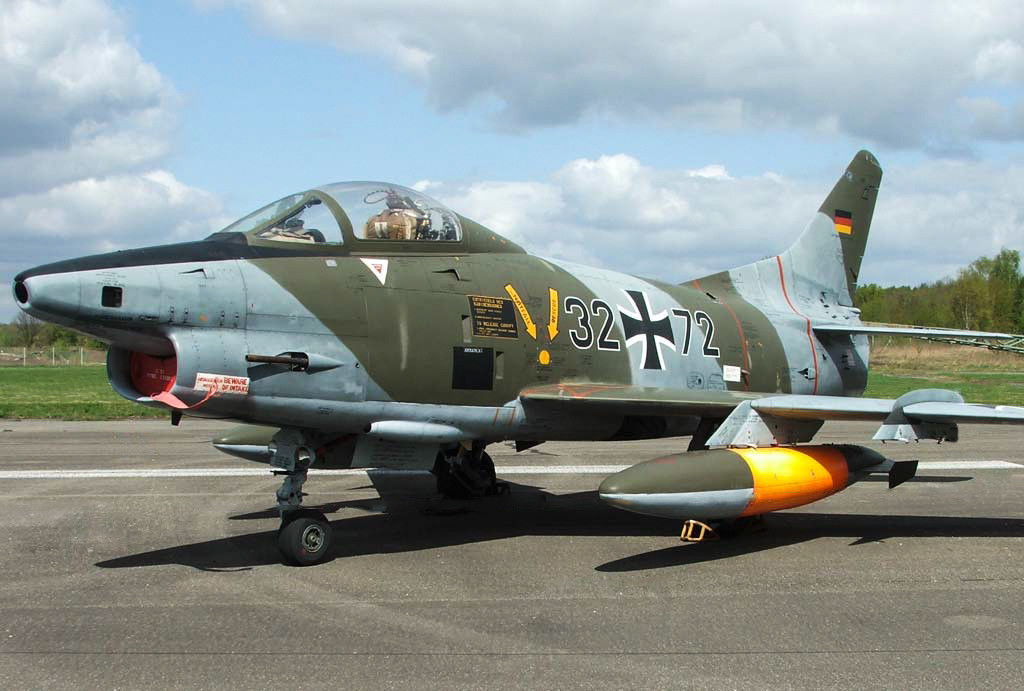
- A Fiat G.91 at the Luftwaffe Museum in Gatow

General information
- Type: Fighter-bomber
- Manufacturer: Fiat Aviazione / Aeritalia
- Status: Retired
- Primary users: Italian Air Force German Air Force; Portuguese Air Force
- Number built: 756

History
- Manufactured: 1956–1977
- Introduction date: 1958
- First flight: 9 August 1956
- Retired: 1995
- Variant: Fiat G.91Y

The Fiat G.91 is a jet fighter aircraft designed and built by the Italian aircraft manufacturer Fiat Aviazione, which later merged into Aeritalia.

The G.91 has its origins in the NATO-organised NBMR-1 competition started in 1953, which sought a light fighter-bomber (officially, the competition was seeking a "Light Weight Strike Fighter") to be adopted as standard equipment across the air forces of the various NATO nations. The G.91 was specifically designed to fulfil the requirements of this competition, being relatively lightweight and capable of operating from austere airstrips while also being armoured and suitably armed while remaining relatively affordable in comparison to many frontline fighters. On 9 August 1956, the prototype conducted its maiden flight. After reviewing multiple submissions, the G.91 was picked as the winning design of the NBMR-1 competition.

During 1961, the G.91 entered into operational service with the Italian Air Force, and with the West German Luftwaffe in the following year. Various other nations adopted it, such as the Portuguese Air Force, who made extensive use of the type during the Portuguese Colonial War in Angola and Mozambique. The G.91 remained in production for 19 years, during which a total of 756 aircraft were completed, including the prototypes and pre-production models. The assembly lines were finally closed in 1977. The G.91 was also used as a basis for a twin-engined derivative: the Fiat/Aeritalia G.91Y. The G.91 had a relatively lengthy service life, outlasting the Cold War and being finally withdrawn in 1995. It was displaced by newer types such as the Dassault/Dornier Alpha Jet and the Aermacchi MB-326.

== Development ==
=== Origins ===
As a result of experiences from the Korean War alongside newly developed concepts of aerial cooperation, the members of NATO recognised a need to reequip their inventories with suitable jet-powered ground attack aircraft. In December 1953, NATO Supreme Command issued specifications for a new light tactical support aircraft. European manufacturers were invited to submit their designs for this requested Light Weight Strike Fighter role. The G.91 was designed to this specification by the Italian engineer Giuseppe Gabrielli, hence the "G" designation. The competition was intended to produce an aircraft that was light, small, expendable, equipped with basic weapons and avionics and capable of operating with minimal ground support. These specifications were developed for two reasons: the first was the nuclear threat to large air bases, many cheaper aircraft could be better dispersed, and the other was to counter the trend towards larger and more expensive aircraft.

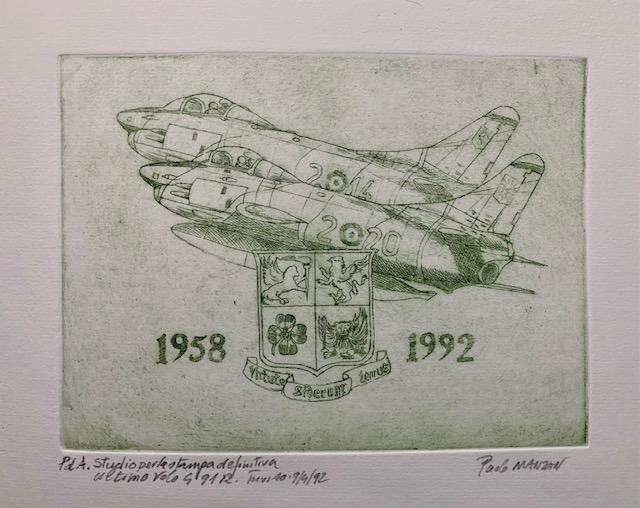
Etching commemorating the last flight of the G.91R from Treviso airport (April 9,1992)

The specified technical requirements included a 1,100 m (3,610 ft) takeoff distance over a 15 m (49 ft) obstacle, the capability to operate from semi-prepared grass airstrips and roads, a maximum speed of Mach 0.95, a range of 280 km (170 mi) with 10 minutes over the target while possessing a maximum of 2,200 kg (4,850 lb) empty weight and 4,700 kg (10,360 lb) max weight. Equipment requirements were the presence of armoured protection for the pilot and the fuel tanks along with alternative arrangements of 4 × 12.7 mm (.5 in) machine guns or 2 × 20 mm or 30 mm autocannon. These operational specifications were viewed as not being straightforward to fulfil at that time.

The challenge of providing an engine that matched the requirements of lightness and power, reliability and ease of maintenance was solved by using the Bristol Siddeley Orpheus turbojet then at the start of development in the UK. Development of this engine was aided by substantial contribution from the US Mutual Weapons Development Programme. Nine of the ten designs to be subsequently submitted for the competition were powered by the Orpheus engine.

In order to evaluate the bids that various aircraft manufacturers submitted in response, a special Advisory Group for Aeronautical Research and Development (AGARD) committee conducted extensive evaluations. The designs were required within two months of the competition, in which time an assortment of submissions were made, mainly by European companies. Besides the G.91, these included the Northrop N-156, Dassault Mystère XXVI, Sud-Est Baroudeur, Aerfer Sagittario 2 and the Breguet Br.1001 Taon. On 18 March 1953, these submitted designs formally began to be assessed by the AGARD committee, which was under the chairmanship of Theodore von Kármán. The initial project selection process took 18 months to complete.

=== Fly-off and selection ===
On 3 June 1955, it was announced that the Fiat G.91 had been selected as the design with the most promise. Out of the submissions, the two winning projects were, in order: the Breguet Br.1001 Taon and the Fiat G.91. A third aircraft design was subsequently added: the Dassault Mystère XXVI. As a result of the G.91's selection, an immediate order was received for three prototypes and a total of 27 pre-production aircraft. Fiat quickly set about developing the concept to the prototype phase; noticeable changes in the design occurred during this phase, such as increases in the aircraft's maximum weight due to the addition of supplementary equipment and structural strengthening measures.

On 9 August 1956, the prototype G.91 conducted its maiden flight at the Caselle airfield, Turin, Italy; it was flown by Chief Test Pilot Riccardo Bignamini. Accordingly, the G.91 had achieved a seven-month head start over the Dassault prototype and almost a year ahead of the Breguet Taon. An intensive series of test flights followed the type's maiden flight, these were not without setbacks. The most serious problem discovered during these was the presence of aeroelastic vibrations, leading to a series of investigative flights to resolve this condition. On 20 February 1957, during a test flight intended to explore the limits of the aircraft's speed-load envelope, difficulties led to the destruction of the first G.91 prototype. The cause of the prototype's loss was linked to problems encountered with the horizontal control system which had led to structural failure; this led to the tail assembly being subjected to rigorous testing to identify the cause of the failure.

The re-engineering work that had been performed to cure the vibration problem was very extensive and resulted in the second prototype being fitted with a larger tail, a six cm (two in) higher canopy, and the addition of a ventral fin. The second prototype had other modifications, including the installation of a full armament and a more powerful Orpheus engine capable of 4,850 lbf. In July 1957, the second prototype performed its first flight; it was not immediately sent to participate in the final evaluation process. Both the third and fourth G.91 prototypes were later sent to France to continue the evaluation flights.

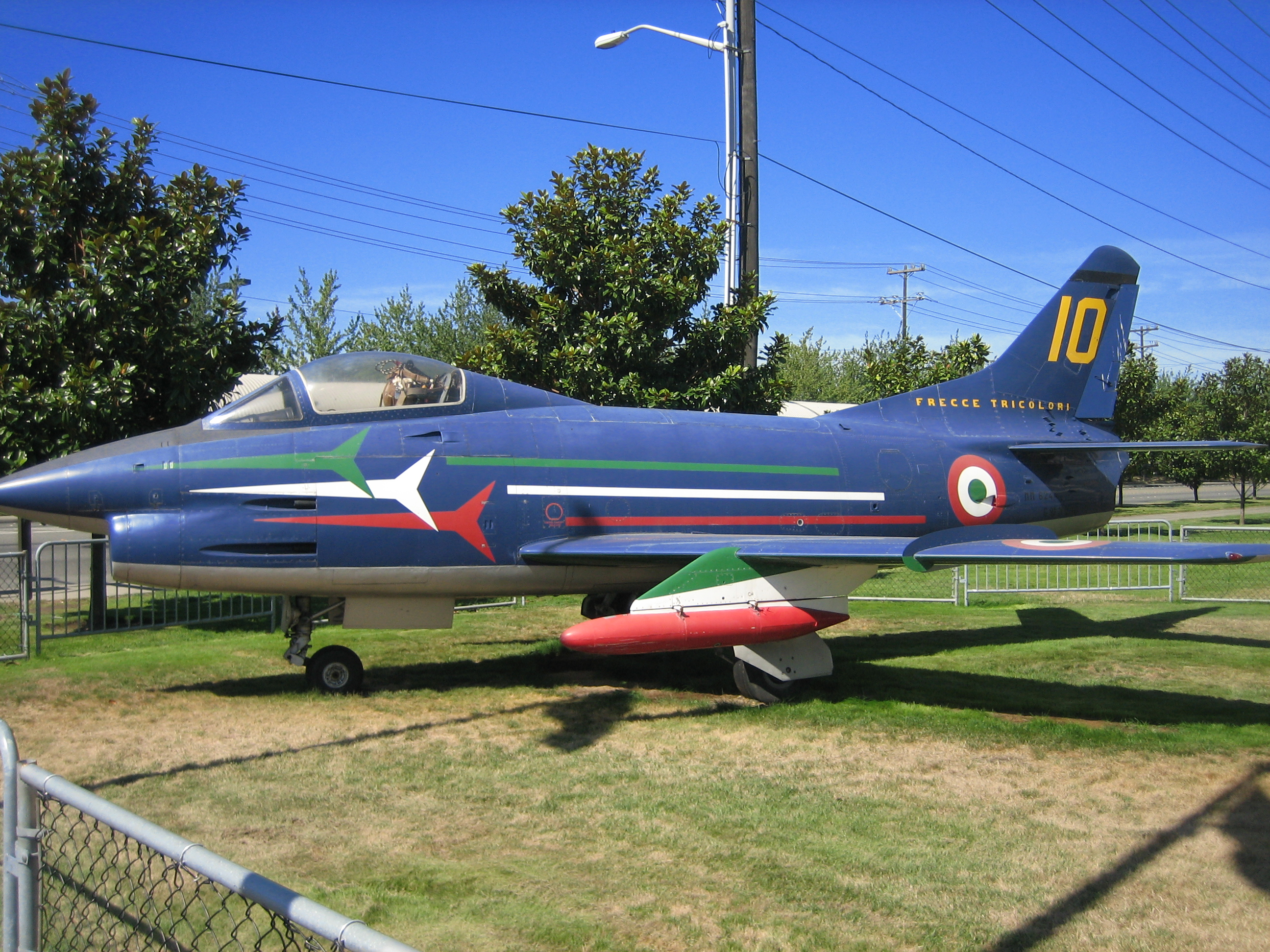
A preserved G.91 on display at Seattle's Museum of Flight. Note the Frecce Tricolori's colors

The final selection of the competing designs was planned for late 1957. In September 1957, at the Centre d'Essais en Vol at Brétigny-sur-Orge, in France, the three rival aircraft types met for evaluation trials. During these trials, the Italian aircraft is claimed to have delivered an impressive performance. In January 1958, the Fiat G.91 was officially declared the winner of the competition.

In April 1958, following a meeting of NATO defence ministers, an agreement was formed that the G.91 would be the first NATO lightweight strike fighter, and that it was to be followed in 1961 by "a developed version" of the Breguet Taon. In May 1958, a production meeting was scheduled to discuss the production of the aircraft with financial support from the United States; the Americans would provide some of the finance for the French, German and Italian aircraft, in addition to paying for the Turkish aircraft. The defence ministers reached an agreement to order 50 aircraft for each country.

Given the large economic and commercial interests at stake, there was a certain amount of controversy surrounding this decision. After the loss of the first G.91 prototype, the French government preferred to pursue development of the locally designed Étendard instead. The British government similarly ignored the competition to concentrate on Hawker Hunter production for the same role. The Italian government had elected to order the G.91 for the Italian Air Force prior to the results of the competition being known. These pre-production machines would later go on to serve for many years with the Italian aerobatic team, the Frecce Tricolori, designated as the G.91 PAN.

=== Production ===
By 1957, Fiat Aviazione was in the process of establishing the first production line for the G.91 at their facility at Turin-Aeritalia Airport, Piedmont, Italy. In total, Fiat constructed 174 G.91s of various variants for Italy, along with an additional 144 G.91 R/3 variants for West Germany (including 50 that had been ordered and then cancelled by Greece and Turkey). The first order was for 50 aircraft from Aeritalia, then Dornier and other German firms had an order for 232 machines, which was later increased to 294. The Luftwaffe (German Air Force) also bought 44 G.91T/3 two-seat trainers and another 22 were produced in Germany, ending production in 1972.

The German order involved a production run of 294 G.91s that were domestically constructed in Germany under a license production arrangement by Flugzeug-Union Süd, a consortium of former competitors Messerschmitt, Heinkel and Dornier; Messerschmitt produced the forward fuselage and tail assembly, Dornier manufactured the center fuselage along with final assembly and flight testing, while Heinkel fabricated the wing. The G.91 holds the distinction of being the first combat aircraft to be manufactured in Germany since the Second World War. On 20 July 1961, the first German-built G.91 conducted its first flight from Oberpfaffenhofen Airfield.

Aeritalia also negotiated a comprehensive license manufacturing agreement for the Orpheus engine that powered the type. Messier-Bugatti-Dowty produced the aircraft's undercarriage.

The G.91 was also considered by a number of nations, including Austria, Norway, and Switzerland. During early 1961, four G.91s were shipped to the United States in order to participate in a formal evaluation program for the United States Army; these aircraft were subjected to several evaluation trials, the majority of which taking place within Alabama and New Mexico. The US Army studied the use of the type as a possible Forward Air Control aircraft. However, the service subsequently relinquished all fixed-wing aircraft operations to the United States Air Force, and thus the prospective G.91 procurement was not pursued.

== Design ==
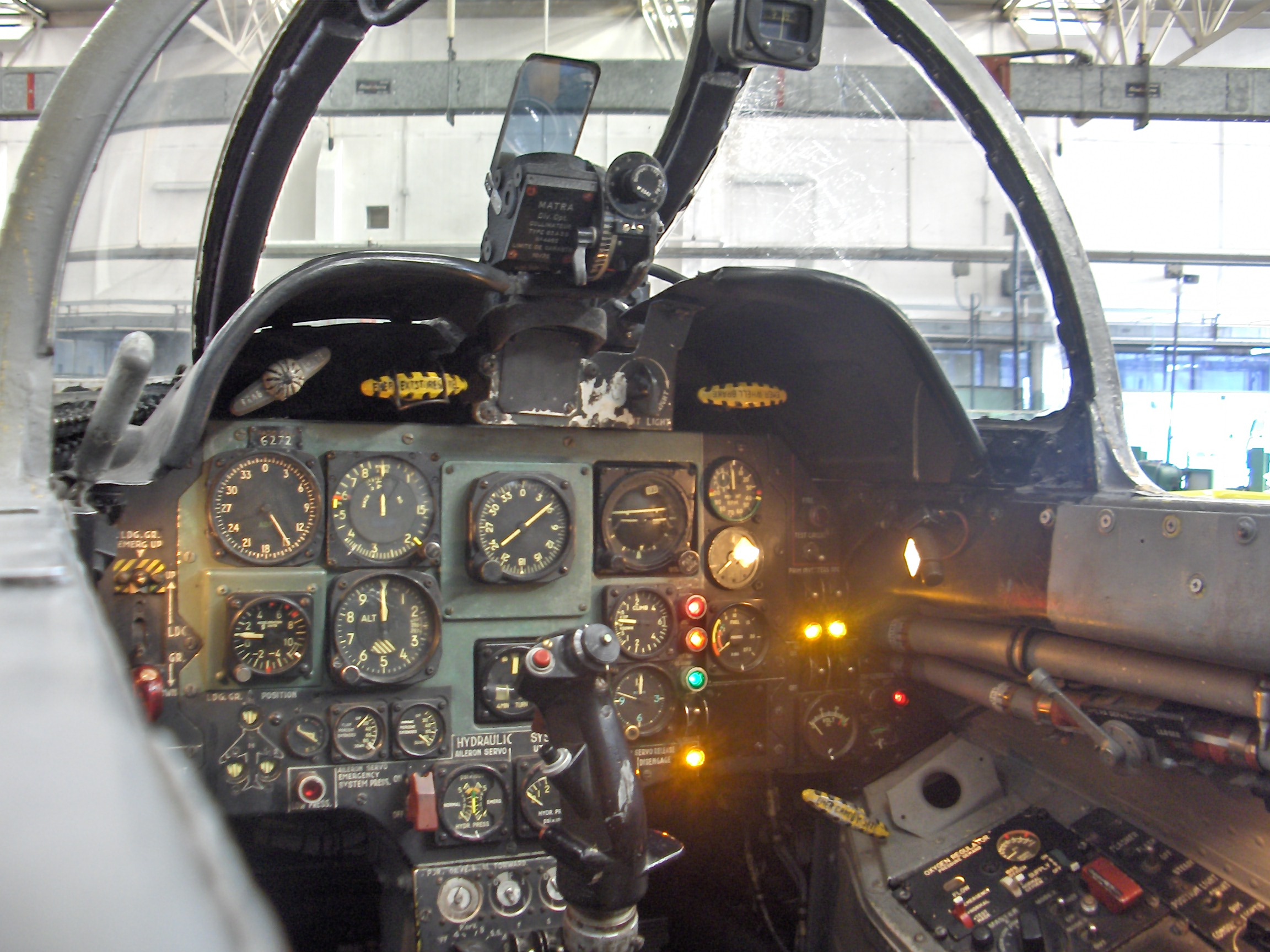
The cockpit of a G.91 R1 in the Istituto Tecnico Industriale Aeronautico A. Malignani, Udine, Friuli-Venezia Giulia, Italy

The Fiat G.91 is a lightweight tactical ground attack aircraft. It is a subsonic aircraft that was designed for both simplicity and agility. A key function of the aircraft is its short-field capability, having been constructed with a rugged airframe to withstand the demands imposed by high-intensity operations and the use of semi-prepared airstrips; the undercarriage is furnished with low-pressure tyres for the same purpose. The standard mission of the G.91 was the attack of targets within a 170-mile radius of its base with a typical loiter time of ten minutes, travelling at maximum speed in the combat area and traversing at cruise speeds. The G.91 is typically powered by a single Bristol Siddeley Orpheus turbojet engine.

The all-metal fuselage uses conventional and straightforward construction methods, being a semi-monocoque design manufactured in three sections. The forward section, which was produced separate to the others before being rivetted to the centre fuselage, contains various radio navigation and communication equipment such as radio direction finder, transponder, ultra high frequency (UHF) radio, and identification friend or foe (IFF); the nose typically contained a total of three cameras. The cockpit is positioned directly above the chin-mounted air intake for the engine. It is surrounded on three sides with steel armour plating, the glass windshield is also armoured. The cockpit is furnished with a Martin-Baker Mk.4 ejector seat; it is both pressurised and equipped with manually controlled climate controls.

The center fuselage section houses the armament bay, which is set beneath the cockpit, and the seven split fuel tanks, which are protected against damage from ground fire by armour plating. The armament bay can accommodate up to four 12.7 mm (0.50 in) M2 Browning machine guns with 300 rounds of ammo per gun, or alternatively up to two 30 mm (1.18 in) DEFA cannon with 120 rounds per cannon. Other munitions included various rockets and bombs; while gun pods and external drop tanks can be installed on hardpoints fitted on the wing. Both weapons and ammunition in the armament bay were mounted on panel doors, which could be easily removed and quickly swapped by two men during rearming on the ground. In addition, various access panels are incorporated to enable simple field maintenance duties to be readily performed on the type.

The G.91 is equipped with a swept wing, which uses an all-metal two-spar structure; the outer panels can all be detached for transportation or easy replacement, while the center section is integral with the fuselage. It is swept at a 37-degree angle at quarter-chord with a thickness-to-chord ratio of 10 per cent. The wing features single-slotted flaps and hydraulically-actuated ailerons. The tailplane is electrically actuated and had irreversible hydraulic elevators fitted with an artificial feel system as well as hydraulically actuated air brakes and a drogue parachute located at the base of the rudder for rapid deceleration.

For the purpose of readily carrying out operations from austere airstrips, Fiat developed purpose-built ground support equipment for the easy and rapid servicing of the aircraft. Specifically, the equipment needed to inspect, maintain, resupply, and repair the G.91 were designed to possess minimal weight and size to facilitate transportation. Fiat also completed a study to add hooks onto the aircraft for the purpose compatibility with arresting gear and aircraft catapult for further increased short field performance; a number of production aircraft in Luftwaffe service were outfitted as such.

== Operational history ==
=== Italy ===
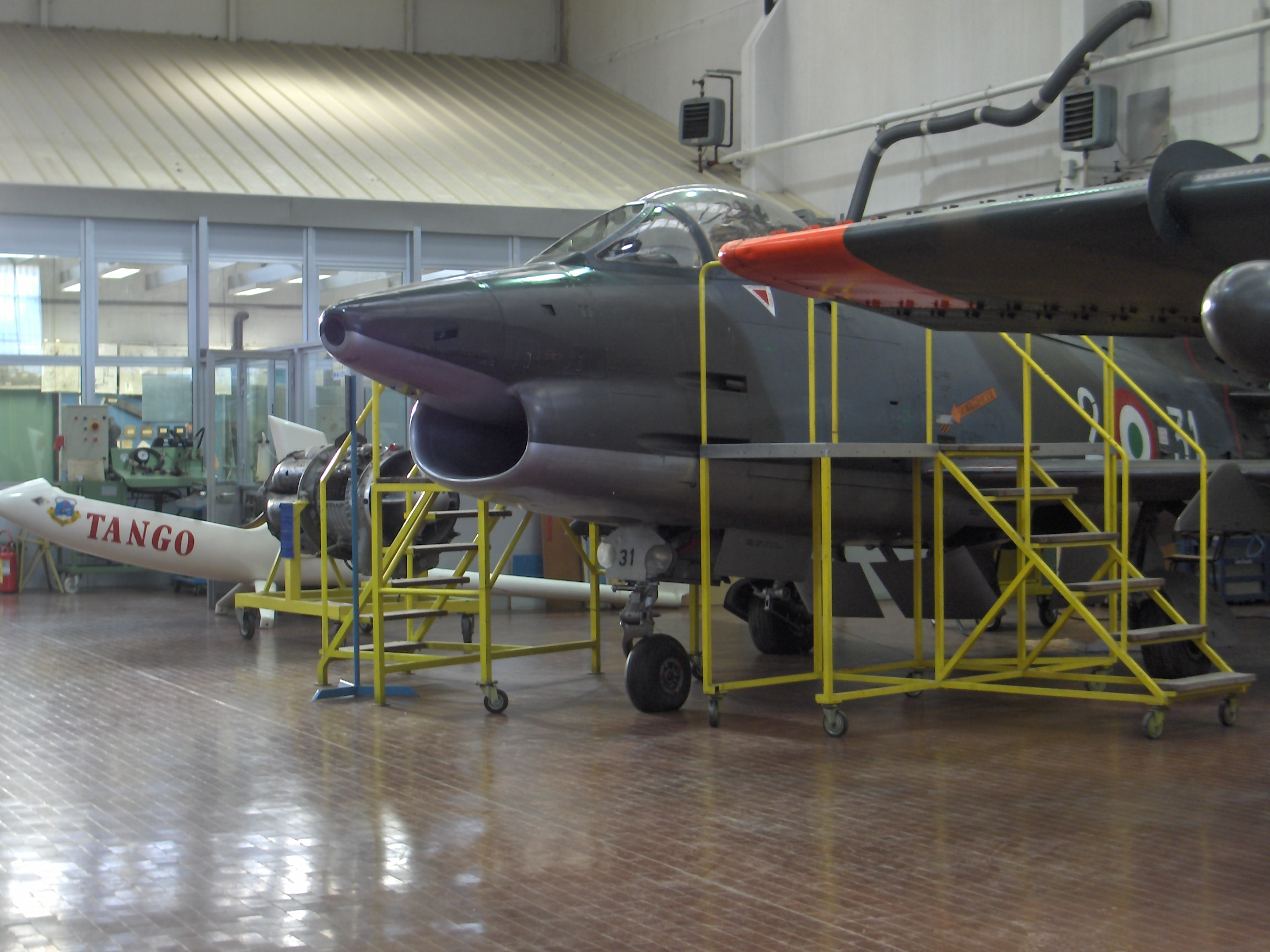
A G.91 R1 in the Istituto Tecnico Industriale Aeronautico A. Malignani, Udine, Friuli-Venezia Giulia, Italy, 2007

On 20 February 1958, the first pre-production G.91 conducted its maiden flight. In August 1958, the 103mo Gruppo, 5a Aerobrigata, called "Caccia Tattici Leggeri" (Light Tactical Fighter Group), was formed for the purpose of conducting operational evaluation of the aircraft, initially based at Pratica di Mare Air Force Base. In 1959, the 103Mo were transferred to Frosinone Airport for trialling the austere basing capabilities of the G.91, including operating from various types of terrain. The unit also performed exercises in the vicinity of Venice, such as at Maniago and Campoformido, in the presence of NATO officials; during this stage of the trials, German pilots also flew the aircraft.

In 1961, the next operational unit to be formed was 14mo Gruppo, Seconda Aerobrigata. This unit had its role shifted to tactical support, because its groups were 14mo, 103mo (dispatched from 5 A/B to this Aerobrigade) and 13mo (only in reserve). All of them were based at Treviso-Sant'Angelo.

During 1964, the pre-production aircraft of 103mo Gruppo were replaced by production standard G.91 R/1 combat aircraft; thus 16 of the pre-production aircraft were converted for service with the Italian aerobatic team, the Frecce Tricolori; these conversions, which had their armament removed and other modifications such as the addition of pitch dampers, ballast, and smoke tanks beneath the wings, were designated as the G.91 PAN. The G.91 PAN reportedly accumulated roughly 1,500 flight hours per year, and had an average efficiency in excess of 90 per cent.

In late 1964, the first batch of two-seater G.91T/1 aircraft, which had lengthened fuselage to accommodate an additional seat for training purposes, was delivered to the Scuola Volo Basico Avanzato (Amendola flying school for advanced jet training). These aircraft were used for the further training of pilots that had recently graduated from the Aermacchi MB-326 jet trainer.

In 1995, the last G.91 was phased out and retired by Italy.

=== Germany ===
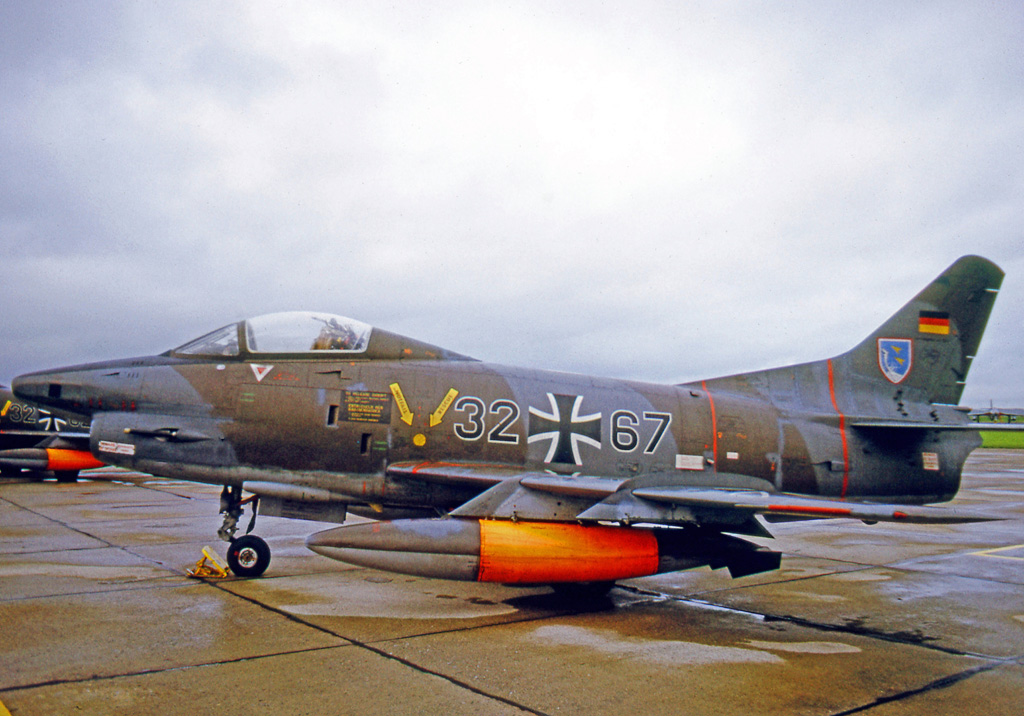
Fiat G.91R/3 of LeKG 43 of the Luftwaffe in 1971

In September 1960, the Luftwaffe received their first two Fiat-built G.91 R/3 aircraft. An initial five G.91R/3 aircraft were delivered to Erprobungstelle 61 for trials with subsequent deliveries being allocated to Aufklärungsgeschwader 53 (53rd Reconnaissance Group) based at Erding, near Munich along with Waffenschule 50 (Weapons School 50). On 20 July 1961, the first Dornier-built G.91 performed its first flight. The G.91R/3 equipped four newly formed Leichte Kampfgeschwader (light attack wings), often being used to replace older aircraft such as the American-built Republic F-84F Thunderstreak.

In October 1961, Aufklärungsgeschwader 53 became the first operational G.91 unit to achieve active status; in late May 1962, this same unit proceeded to carry out its first operational training flights. During 1962 and 1963, the Luftwaffe conducted a series of trials to determine the capabilities of the type in terms of austere and unfavourable climate performance, including an overseas deployment to Béchar Province, Algeria, to test the G.91's versatility and operational efficiency within such climate conditions.

An additional 45 G.91 T/3 Fiat-built two-seat trainer aircraft were ordered for the Luftwaffe, the first 35 being allocated to Waffenschule 50 with the balance of the order divided between operational units. In early 1961, Waffenschule 50 began its first training courses for pilot instructors. Of these, 22 aircraft were built by Dornier between 1971 and 1973; this variant were used to train Weapons Systems Officers for the F-4 Phantom.

Fifty G.91 R/4 aircraft were taken up from a cancelled Greek/Turkish order but were deemed to be unsuitable for operational use. These were used as training aircraft and were operated solely by Waffenschule 50. When the initial training programme was completed, all R/4 aircraft were retired in 1966 and 40 surviving airframes were sold to Portugal. Other R/4 aircraft remained in Germany and were transferred to ground instructional use or for static displays at recruitment presentations.

It has been claimed that the Luftwaffe had intended to equip a further four wings with the G.91R/3; however, initial operating experience with the type had allegedly left the Luftwaffe disappointed with the aircraft's performance and thus the intended further orders for the type were cut. A number of Luftwaffe G.91s were emblazoned with a "pig" emblem, this has been interpreted as a comment on the aircraft's lacklustre performance.

On 1 January 1970, the Luftwaffe fleet consisted of 310 G.91 R/3 and 40 G.91T aircraft; by 1976, only 20 of the G.91 R/3 aircraft had been lost to accidents, a loss rate of 6 per cent. During the early 1980s, the G.91 R/3 was replaced in German service by the Dassault/Dornier Alpha Jet which operated in the same role; the last G.91 aircraft were officially retired in 1982.

=== Portugal ===
From 1961, Portugal became involved in fighting against nationalist movements in its African overseas territories, the series of conflicts becoming known as the Portuguese Colonial War. Portugal had deployed a detachment of F-86 Sabres to Portuguese Guinea in August 1961, prior to the outbreak of major fighting, but was forced to withdraw the jet fighters back to Europe owing to pressure from the United States and the United Nations, who imposed an arms embargo. This left a gap in air cover for Portugal's African colonies, both in the close air support role, and in the air defence role.

In 1965, as the scale of fighting increased, Portugal attempted to purchase 100 surplus Canadian built Sabre Mk 6s from West Germany, but instead, it was offered 40 G.91R/4s, which had originally been built for Greece and Turkey and which differed from the rest of the Luftwaffe G.91s sufficiently to create maintenance problems in exchange for allowing Germany to build and use an airbase at Beja in Portugal for training.

G.91s arrived in Portuguese Guinea in 1966, equipping Esquadra 121 Tigres based at Bissau, and being used for reconnaissance and close support with rockets, napalm and bombs against PAIGC rebels. When the PAIGC started to be supplied with Soviet-made Strela 2 (NATO designation SA-7 Grail) MANPADS in early 1973, these immediately became a threat to Portuguese air superiority. On 25 March 1973, and 28 March, two FAP G.91s were shot down by missiles, with a further two lost to conventional ground fire later in the year. (By comparison, only two G.91s had been lost in Guinea from 1966 to 1973.) A final G.91 was lost to a missile on 31 January 1974, while Strelas were also responsible for the loss of a T-6 Texan and two Do.27K-2s.

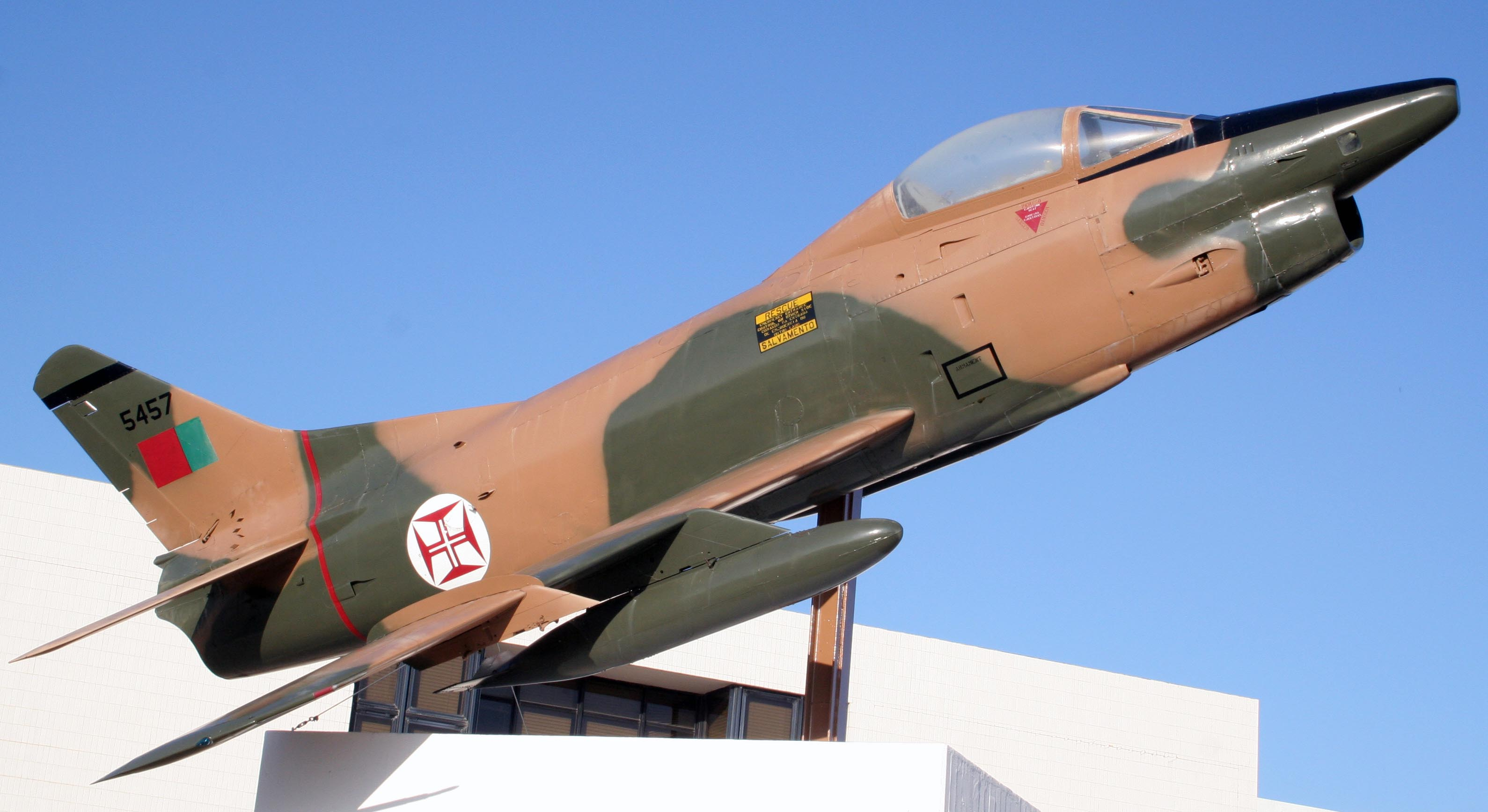
Portuguese Air Force G.91 preserved at Sintra Air Base

G.91s deployed to Mozambique at the end of 1968, equipping Esquadra 502 Jaguares ininitally at Beira, later moving to Nacala, with a second squadron Esquadra 702 Escorpiões (Scorpions) forming in September 1970 at Tete, flying against FRELIMO forces. FRELIMO also received Strelas in 1973, although unlike elsewhere, the Portuguese in Mozambique did not lose any aircraft to missiles, even if it forced Portuguese pilots to change their tactics. The only G.91 destroyed in combat in Mozambique was the serial number 5429, flown by Lt. Emilio Lourenço: his plane was destroyed and Lourenço killed by a premature detonation of its bombs while flying a strike against rebel positions on 15 March 1973.

In 1973, with the United Nations weapons embargo against Portugal, the Air Force faced problems purchasing further numbers of close air support aircraft. An attempt was then made to acquire more Fiat G.91s from Germany by having Dornier disassembling the aircraft and then selling them as spare parts to Switzerland and Spain. These spare parts would be later sold to Portugal and assembled locally with different serial numbers. However, the deal did not follow through as the German government vetoed it.

In April 1974, the Portuguese government fell in the Carnation Revolution, with the new government seeking to grant its colonies independence. Portugal withdrew its G.91s from Guinea when it was granted independence in 1974, with its forces also leaving Mozambique. One of the G.91 squadrons was briefly deployed to Angola in late 1974, in order to try to prevent fighting between rival National Liberation Front of Angola (FNLA) and National Union for the Total Independence of Angola (UNITA) forces, being finally withdrawn back to Portugal in January 1975.

In 1976, a second purchase of 14 G.91 R/3s and 7 G.91 T/3 trainers was made from Germany, which were followed by further aircraft when the G.91 was withdrawn from Luftwaffe service in from 1980 to 1982, giving a total of 70 R/3s and 26 T/3s, although not all of these entered service, with many being broken up for spare parts. Portugal finally phased out the last of its G.91s in 1993.

=== Others ===
On 6 September 1961, the first G.91 R/4 was delivered to the Hellenic Air Force (HAF) for evaluation purposes. The G.91 R/4 variant, of which 25 aircraft were intended to be delivered to both Greece and Turkey, employed the same armament as the G.91 R/1 while using the equipment of the R/3 variant. However, both Greece and Turkey would ultimately not induct any G.91s, these aircraft were instead passed onto Germany's inventory.

== Variants ==
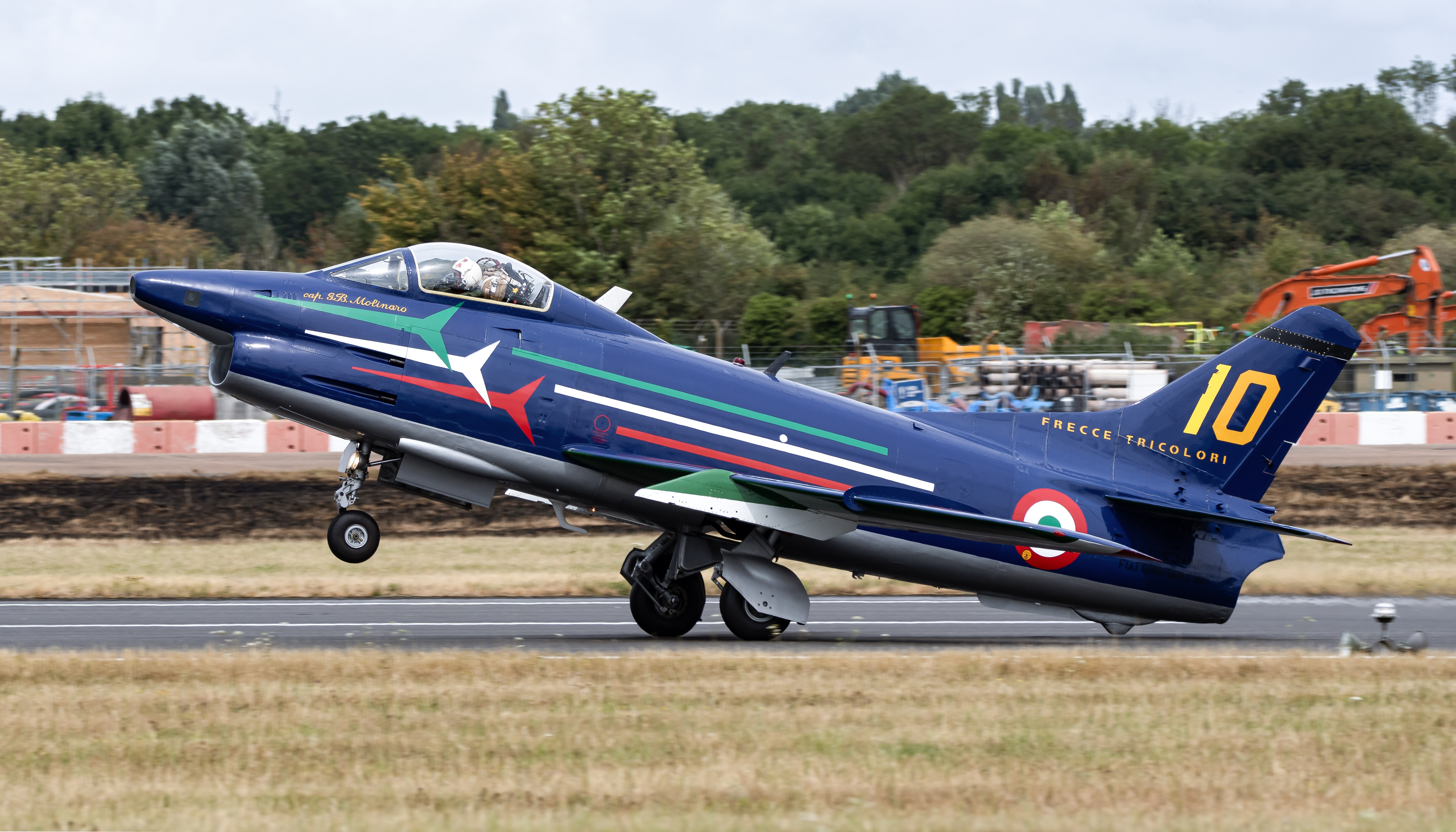
The only Fiat G.91 that is still airworthy. RIAT 2025.

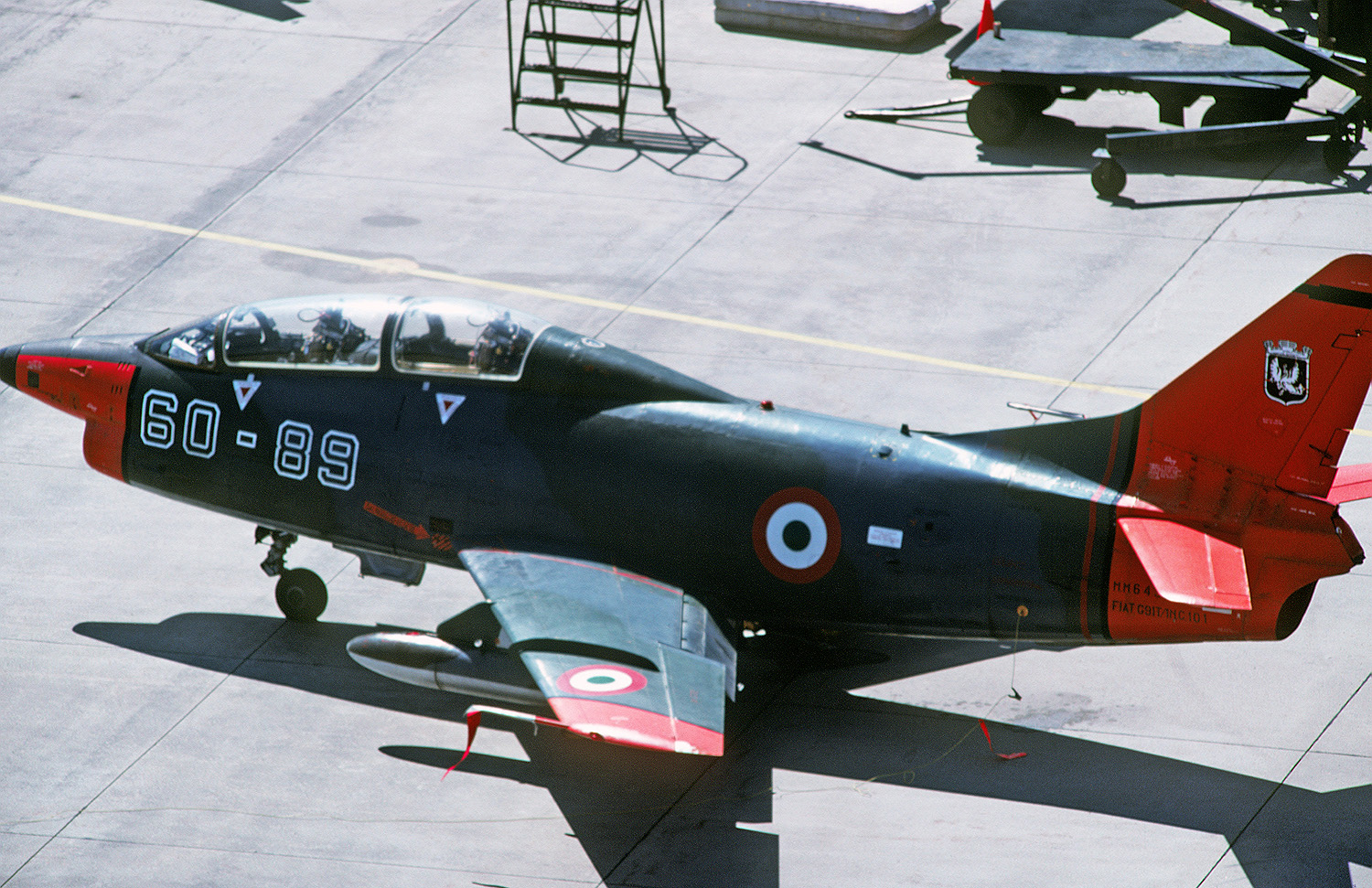
An Italian trainer Fiat G.91T of the 60° Stormo (60th Wing) is parked on the flight line while transiting Bitburg Air Base, Rhineland-Palatinate, West Germany, 1988

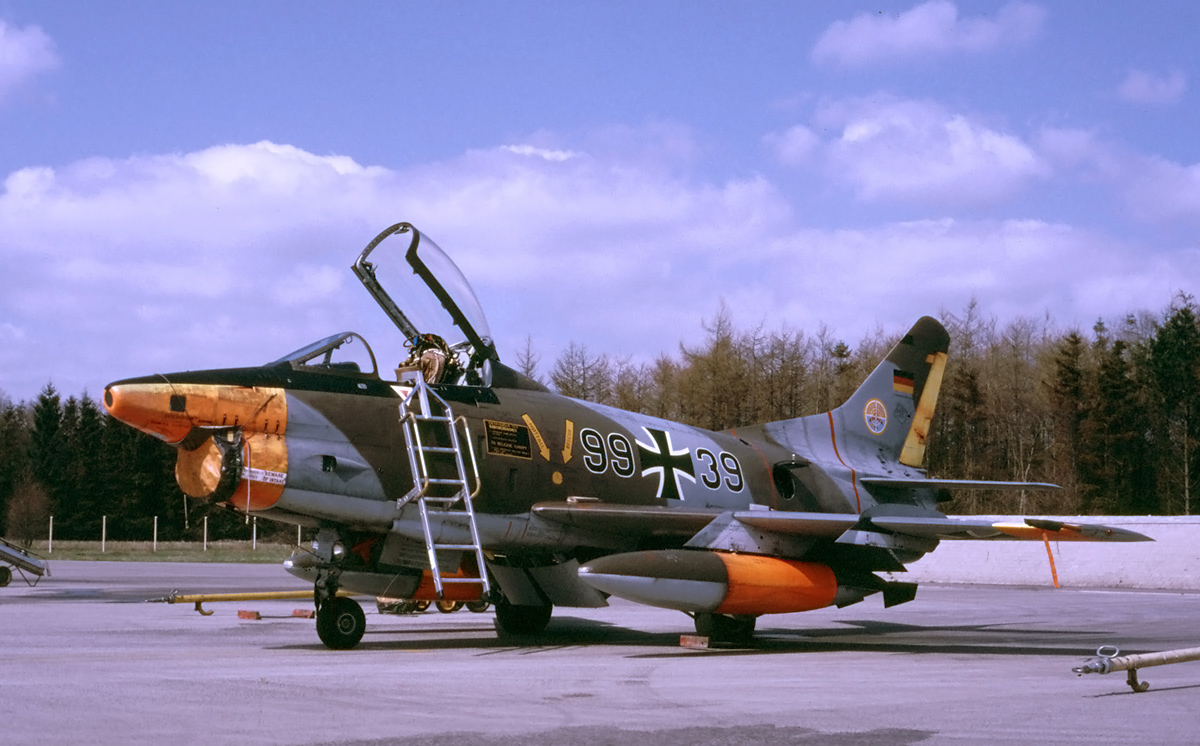
A German G.91, equipped for towing aerial targets, at Hohn, Schleswig-Holstein, West Germany, April 1986

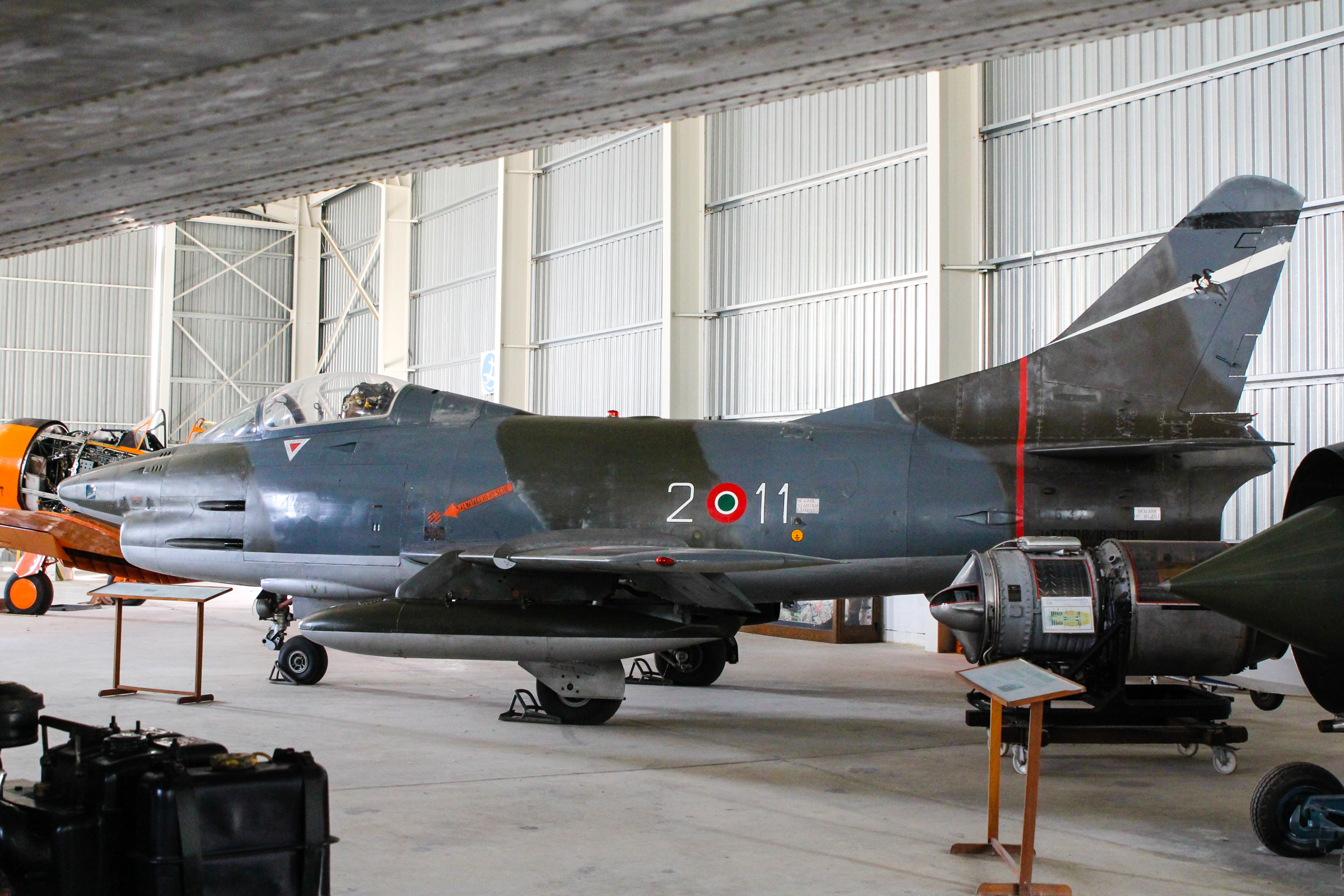
Fiat G.91R/1B at the Malta Aviation Museum

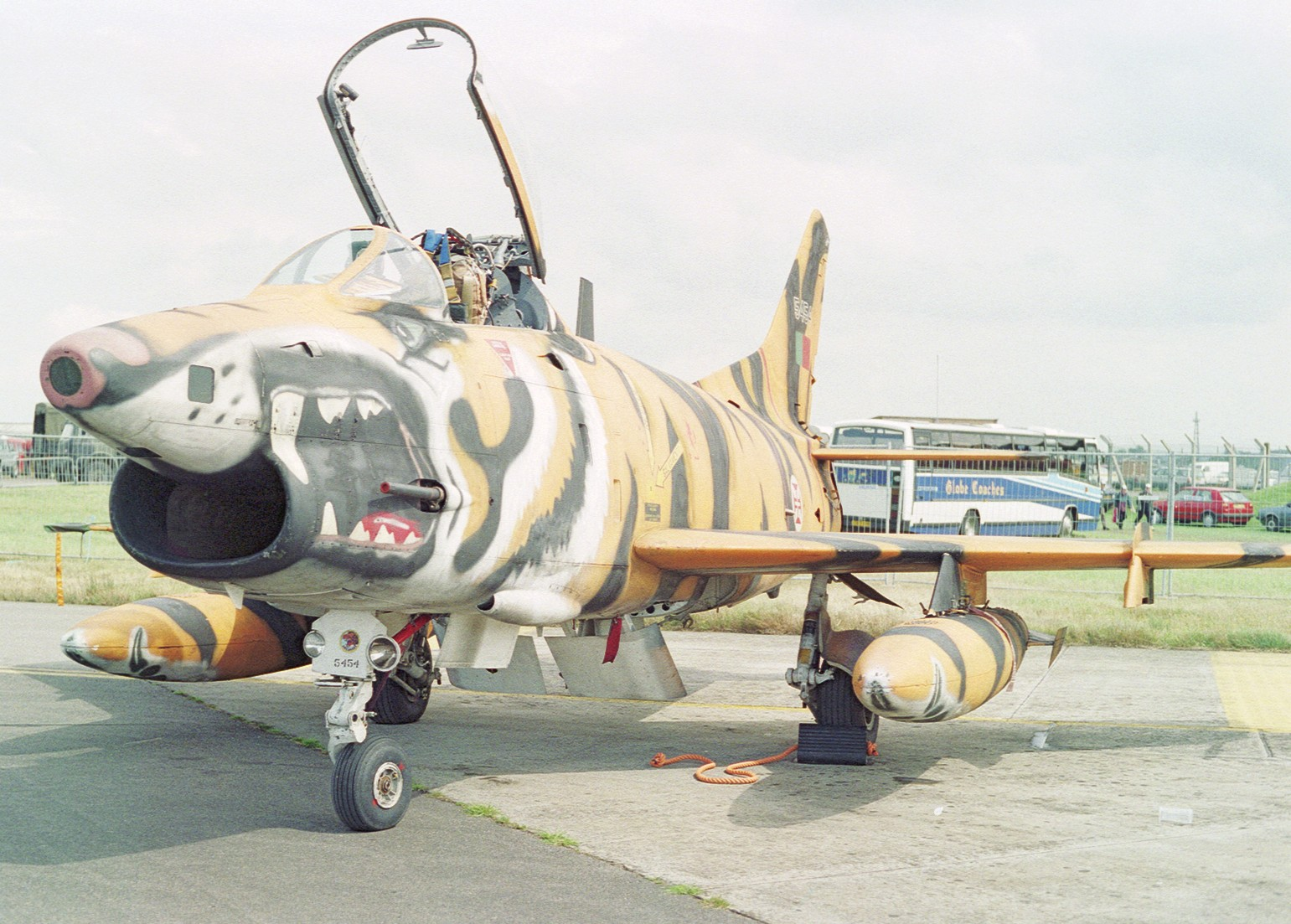
A Portuguese G.91R/3 on static display at RAF Fairford, Gloucestershire, England, during the International Air Tattoo (IAT), July 1993

Data from: Warpaint No.49:Fiat G.91

Trainer and reconnaissance variants were produced right from the start of G.91 production, but the basic design of the aircraft remained virtually unchanged throughout almost the entire production run of the aircraft. The one major difference is that the R series aircraft were single-seaters, while the T series aircraft had two seats. To accommodate the extra seat, the T series aircraft had a slightly longer fuselage.

G.91
Prototypes and pre-production aircraft.
G.91A
A single prototype, built to test wing slats and fuel tanks in the wings.
G.91BS/1
(BS – Battle Surveillance) Derived from the G.91T with improved avionics and photographic equipment, not built.
G.91BS/2
Two-seat version of the BS/1, not built.
G.91E
Proposed version of the G.91Y for the AMI, not built.
G.91N
A single aircraft modified from a pre-production aircraft with extra navigation equipment such as Decca Navigator and Rho-Theta.
G.91R/1
Light attack/reconnaissance aircraft, fitted with modified nose housing three cameras.
G.91R/1A
Revised instrumentation.
G.91R/1B
Strengthened airframe.
G.91R/3
Single-seat ground-attack, reconnaissance version for the Luftwaffe. Armed with two 30 mm (1.181 in) DEFA cannons.
G.91R/3SATS
A single R/3 modified with JATO rockets and arrestor hook for the Luftwaffe:
G.91R/4
Similar to the G.91R/3, but armed with four 12.7 mm (0.5 in) Colt-Browning machine guns. A total of 50 were built under the United States Military Assistance Program for Greece and Turkey, but ultimately, ten were diverted for the West Germany while the remaining 40 were transferred to Portugal.
G.91R/5
A projected long-range version for Norway.
G.91R/6
A projected version with improved undercarriage, revised avionics, increased tankage and weapon load, for Italy.
G.91RS or G.91S
Projected variant with revised wing and 31.4 kN (7,050 lbf) B.Or.12 Orpheus or Fiat 4032 engine, not built.
G.91T/1
Trainer version of G.91R/1 for Italian Air Force.
G.91T/3
Trainer version for Luftwaffe.
G.91T/3 Logair
A single conversion of a Luftwaffe T/3 with a data acquisition probe.
G.91T/4
Proposed trainer version, fitted with cockpit instrumentation similar to the Lockheed F-104 Starfighter, not built.
G.91TS
Projected supersonic version of the G.91T, not built.
G.91PAN
Aerobatic display aircraft for Frecce Tricolori, converted from pre-production G.91s.
G.91 target tug
A target tug variant was developed with an under-wing pylon mounted winch and target drogue. The drogue being attached to an extension of the winch around the trailing edge, above the wing. Other modifications included a large blade aerial above the centre fuselage and an anti-collision light at the forward end of the dorsal fin.
G.91Y
An additional 67 aircraft built by Aeritalia were significantly different from earlier versions. These single-seat aircraft, based on the longer trainer version, designated G.91Y and nicknamed "Yankee", replaced the original single Bristol Siddeley Orpheus engine with two General Electric J85 units in a "completely re-engineered structure" giving 60% more power and doubling the tankage for increased range with 75% more payload. The G.91Y first flew on 12 December 1966 and displayed an improvement in speed, range, payload, and manoeuvrability. The maximum speed was increased to 1,110 km/h (690 mph, 600 kn, Mach 0.91). The machine guns were replaced by a pair of DEFA 552 30 mm cannon with 125 rounds per gun. All the aircraft built served with the Italian Air Force.
G.91YT
A projected two-seat version of the G.91Y, not built.
G.91YS
Proposed version of the G.91Y for Switzerland, one built.

== Operators ==
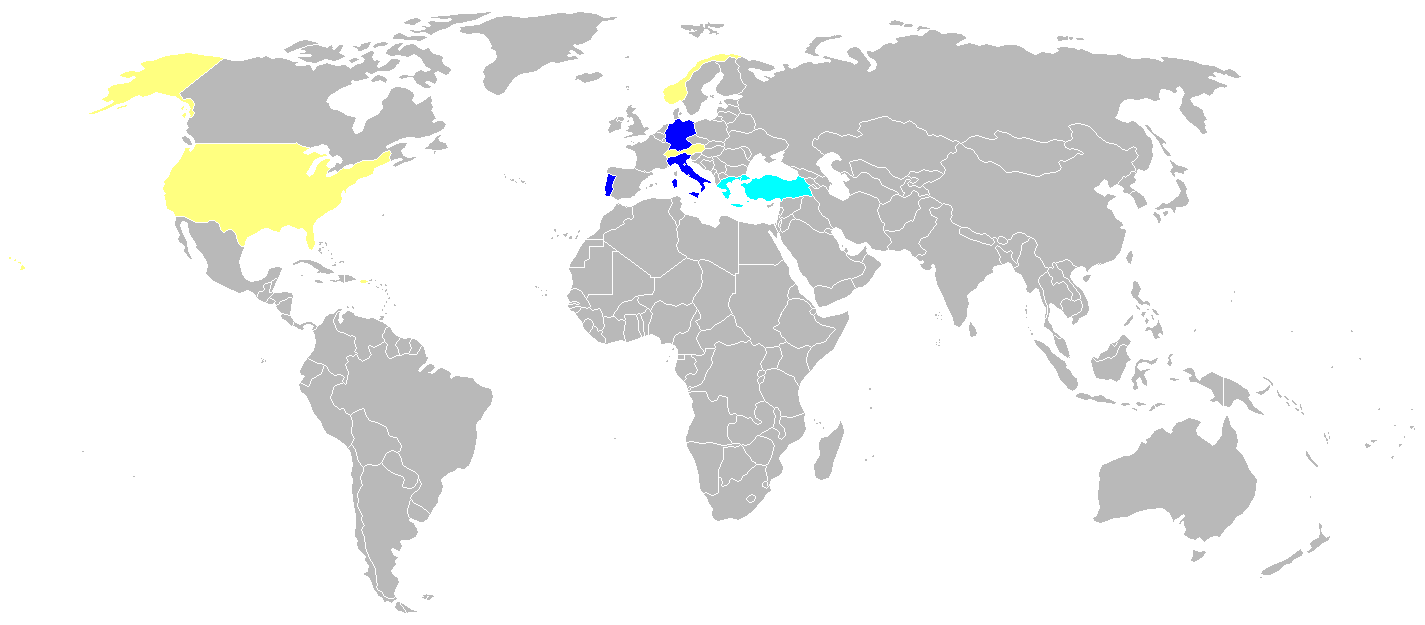
Operators of the G.91 in dark blue, cancelled orders in light blue, evaluations in yellow

West Germany

- German Air Force (Luftwaffe)
  - Aufklärungsgeschwader 53
  - Aufklärungsgeschwader 54
  - Erprobungstelle 61
  - Leichtes Kampfgeschwader 41
  - Leichtes Kampfgeschwader 42 (Taktisches Luftwaffengeschwader 73)
  - Leichtes Kampfgeschwader 43
  - Leichtes Kampfgeschwader 44
  - Waffenschule 50

Greece

- Hellenic Air Force – G.91R/4, evaluation-only. It was rejected in favor of American designs

Italy

- Italian Air Force – operated 31 Fiat G.91, 97 Fiat G.91R and 103 Fiat G.91T/1 retired in 1995
  - Frecce Tricolori

Portugal

- Portuguese Air Force − 40 G.91/R4s. Purchased from West Germany in 1965, it remained in service until 1993

Turkey

- Turkish Air Force − G.91R/4, evaluation-only. It was rejected in favor of American designs

United States

- United States Army – Evaluated two aircraft (1 G.91R/1, 1 G.91R/3) in 1961.
- United States Air Force – 10 G.91R/1 were evaluated in 1961−1962

== Aircraft on display ==
- Aeroporto di Arezzo - G.91T/1 2-seat trainer (outdoor) - 32° Stormo (Wing) colours 43.45920953597038°N 11.846322640054664°E
- Luftwaffenmuseum der Bundeswehr, Gatow
- Museo Nazionale Scienza e Tecnologia Leonardo da Vinci, Milan, Italy
- Istituto Tecnico Industriale Aeronautico, Udine, Friuli-Venezia Giulia, Italy
- Sintra Air Base, Portugal
- Malta Aviation Museum, Ta'Qali, Malta
- Jardim Gil Eanes, Portimão, Portugal

== Specifications (G.91R) ==
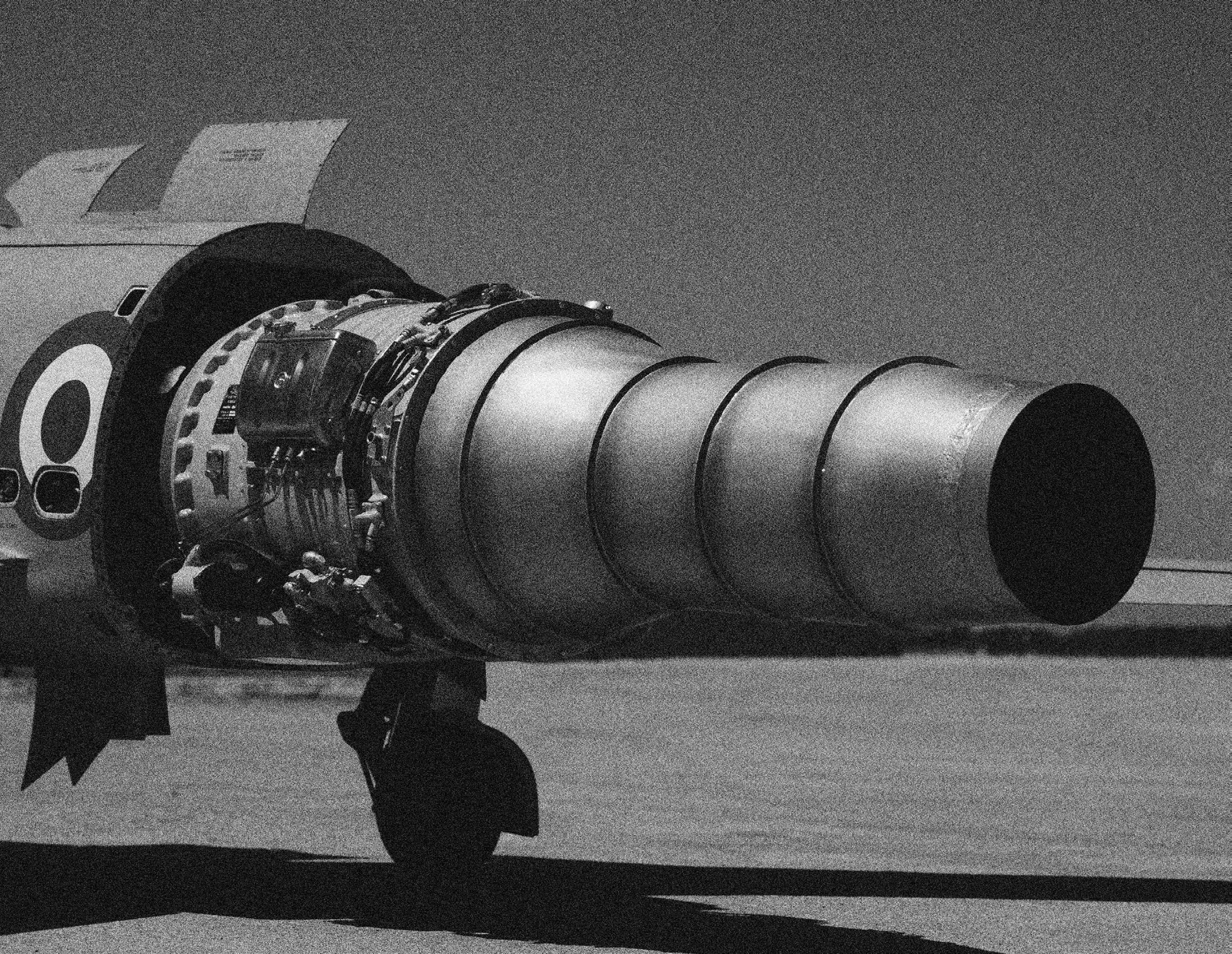
Close up of an Orpheus engine installed on a Fiat G.91 with the rear section removed

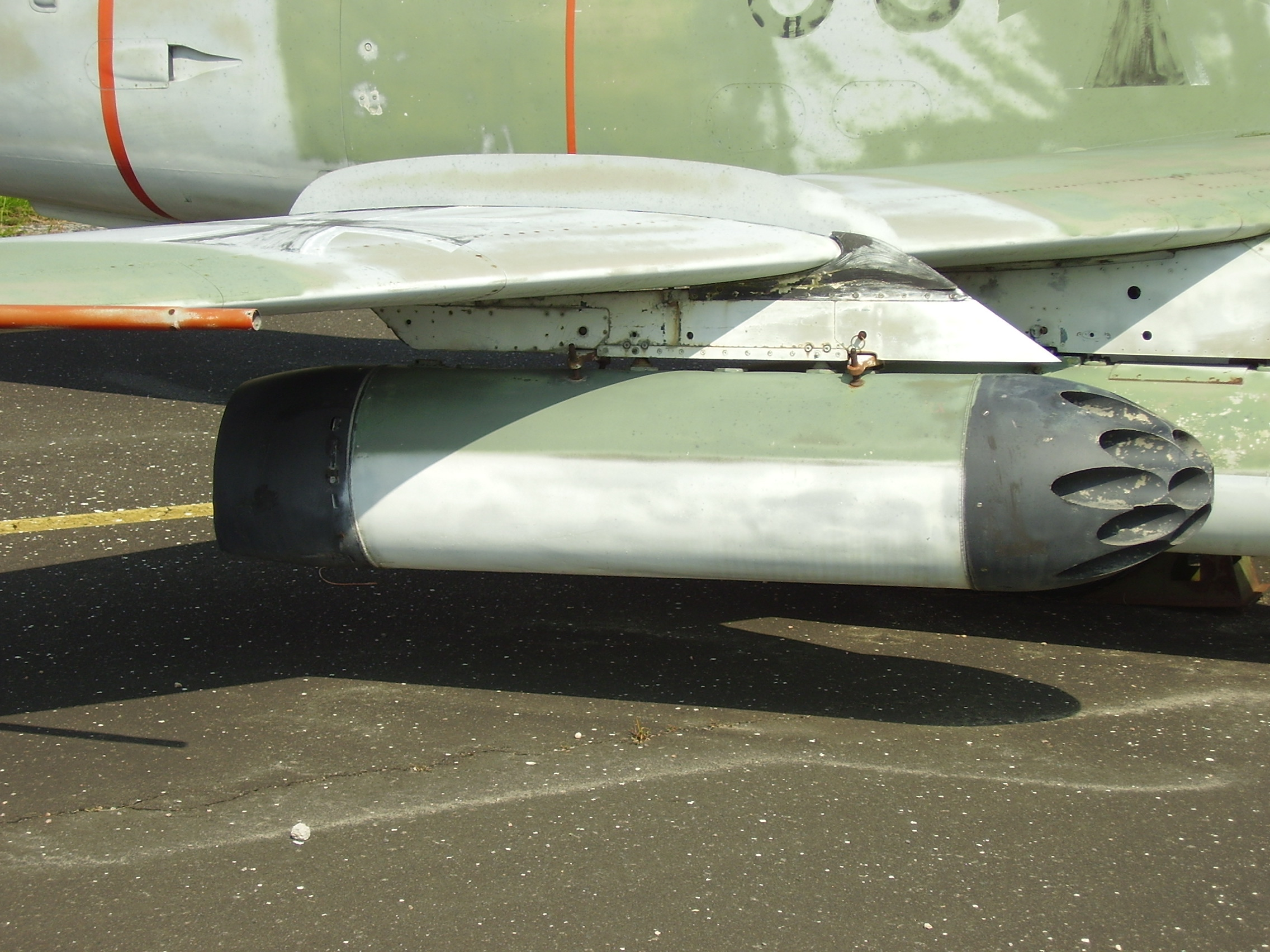
A Matra Type 116M rocket launcher mounted on a G.91 on display at the Luftwaffenmuseum der Bundeswehr, Berlin

Data from Profile Publications

General characteristics

- Crew: 1
- Length: 10.3 m (33 ft 10 in)
- Wingspan: 8.56 m (28 ft 1 in)
- Height: 4 m (13 ft 1 in)
- Wing area: 16.4 m^{2} (177 sq ft)
- Airfoil: root: NACA 65A112; tip: NACA 65A111
- Empty weight: 3,100 kg (6,834 lb)
- Gross weight: 5,440 kg (11,993 lb)
- Max takeoff weight: 5,500 kg (12,125 lb)
- Powerplant: 1 × Bristol Siddeley Orpheus 803 turbojet, 22.2 kN (5,000 lbf) thrust

Performance

- Maximum speed: 1,075 km/h (668 mph, 580 kn)
- Range: 1,150 km (710 mi, 620 nmi)
- Service ceiling: 13,100 m (43,000 ft)
- Rate of climb: 30 m/s (5,900 ft/min)
- Wing loading: 331 kg/m^{2} (68 lb/sq ft)
- Thrust/weight: 0.42

Armament

- Guns:
  4× 12.7 mm (0.50 in) M3 Browning machine guns; or
  2× 30 mm (1.18 in) DEFA cannons (Luftwaffe G.91R/3 only)
- Hardpoints: 4× under-wing pylon stations with a capacity of 680 kg (1,500 lb) for G.91R/3 & R/4 and 500 kg (1,100 lb) for G.91R/1, with provisions to carry combinations of:
  - Rockets: 2× Matra rocket pods (each with 19× SNEB 68 mm rockets); or
    18× Hispano SURA R80 80 mm rockets
  - Missiles: 4× Nord AS-20 air-to-ground missiles; or 4× AIM-9 Sidewinder air-to-air missiles
  - Bombs: A wide variety of air-to-ground ordnance including unguided iron bombs
  - Other: gun pods or auxiliary drop tanks for extended range

== See also ==
External videos
- Documentary on the Fiat G.91
- Footage of Italian G.91 squadron operations in 1987
- Video of various low passes and other manoeuvres conducted by Frecce Tricolori G.91s

Related development

- Fiat G.91Y

Aircraft of comparable role, configuration, and era

- Dassault Étendard IV
- Douglas A-4 Skyhawk
- Folland Gnat
- Hawker Hunter
- Lim-6
- North American F-86D Sabre
- Northrop F-5

Related lists

- List of fighter aircraft
