= Fiat G.91Y =

Italian ground-attack aircraft

G.91Y
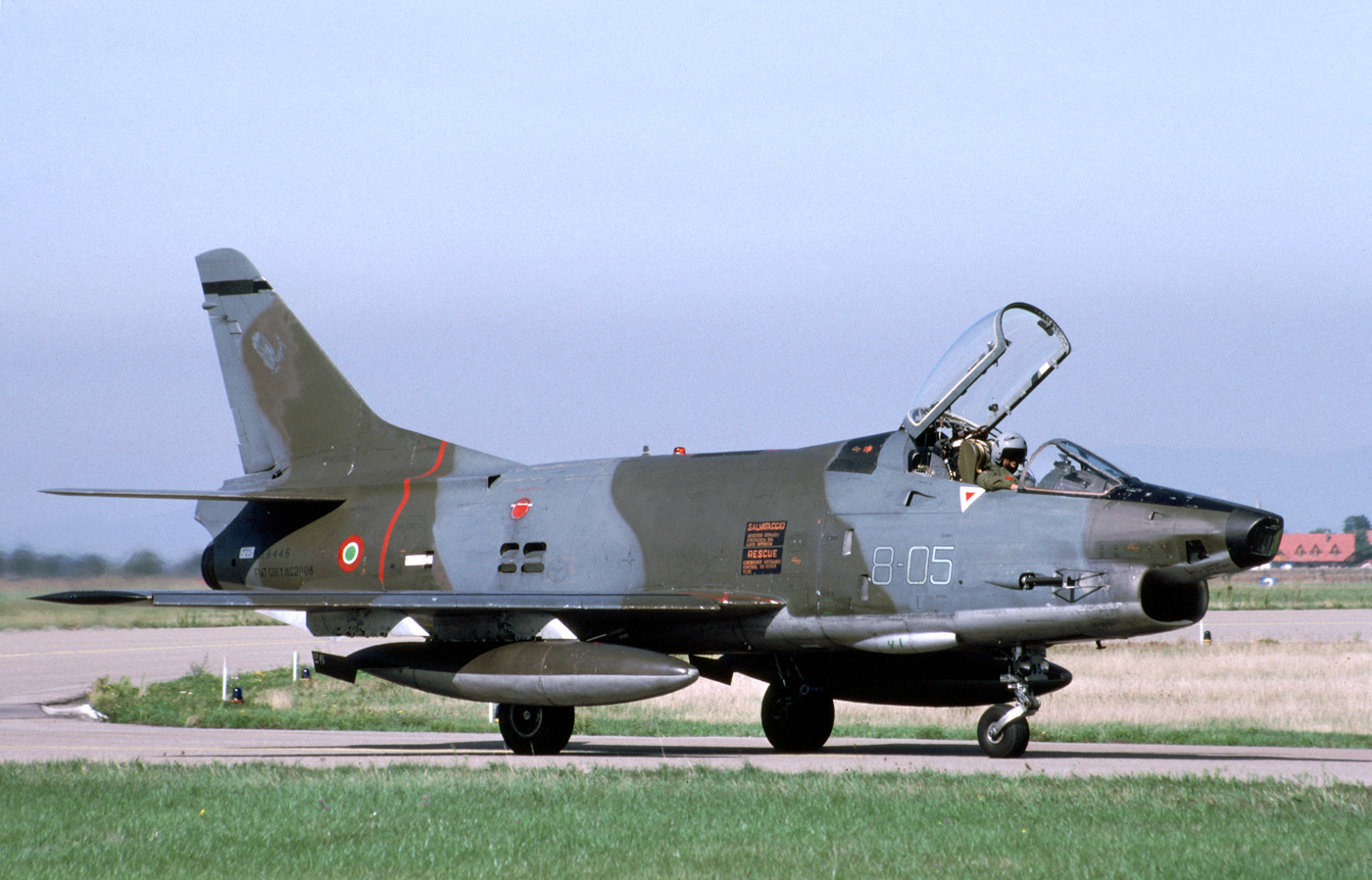
- A G91Y at Bremgarten in September 1992

General information
- Type: Ground attack
- National origin: Italy
- Manufacturer: Fiat Aviazione; Aeritalia
- Primary user: Italian Air Force
- Number built: 2 prototypes + 65

History
- Manufactured: 1966-1972
- Introduction date: July 1968
- First flight: 27 December 1966
- Retired: 1994
- Developed from: Fiat G.91

The Fiat (later Aeritalia) G.91Y is a ground attack and reconnaissance aircraft designed and originally produced by the Italian aircraft manufacturer Fiat Aviazione.

The G.91Y is a derivative of the Fiat G.91; while intended to perform the same roles and baring a strong visual resemblance to one another, the G.91Y was an extensive redesign of its predecessor. The most prominent difference between the two aircraft was that G.91Y was powered by a new twin-engine configuration that replaced the earlier aircraft's single engine arrangement. In combination with weight reduction measures, additional fuel tanks, and a variety of new licence-produced avionics, the G.91Y's performance and capabilities differed considerably from the G.91.

Three pre-production G.91Ys were built, one of which performed the type's maiden flight on 27 December 1966. The flight test programme was relatively trouble-free, permitting the G.91Y to enter service with Italian Air Force in July 1968. The service procured multiple batches, it was the sole operator of the G.91Y, although efforts to garner export sales were made, which included the developed of the further improved G.91YS model that underwent a formal evaluation by Switzerland as well as numerous visits to various international airshows. The Italian Air Force withdrew the last of its G.91Ys during 1994, by which time the type been replaced by the newer AMX.

== Design and development ==
=== Background ===
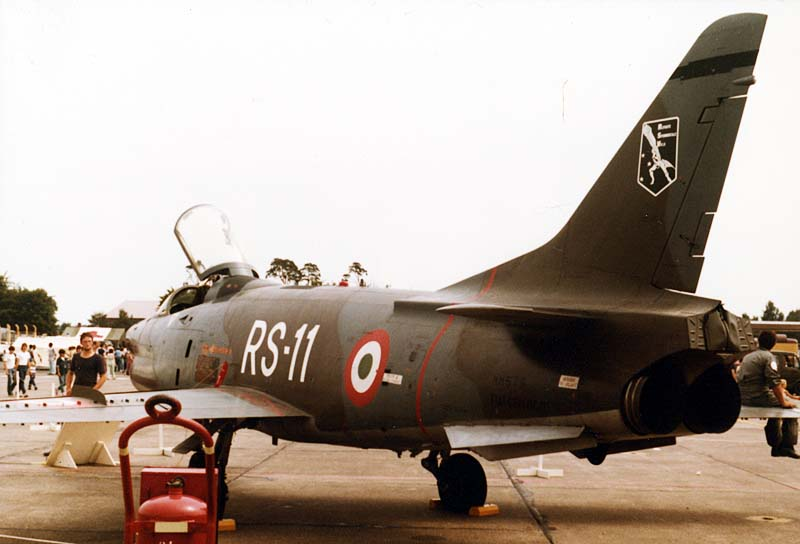
A Fiat G.91Y at Ramstein Air Base in 1986

During the 1950s, the Fiat G.91 had been developed to fulfil NATO's NBMR-1 requirement for a jet-powered ground attack aircraft. Even prior to the G.91's selection to be the first NATO lightweight strike fighter in April 1958, the Italian government had opted to order the type to equip the Italian Air Force. Beyond its intended role as a ground attack aircraft, the Italian government also funded its further development into the G.91 PAN unarmed aerobatic aircraft (which was procured for Italy's Frecce Tricolori aerial display team) as well as the G.91T twin-seat advanced trainer (Italian Air Force pilots would typically fly this after graduating from the Aermacchi MB-326 jet trainer).

The G.91Y was an increased-performance derivative of the G.91 that secured the backing of the Italian government during the mid 1960s. Derived from the G.91T trainer variant, the principal change was the replacement of the single Bristol Orpheus turbojet engine of this aircraft was replaced by a pair of afterburning General Electric J85 turbojet engines; in contrast to the single-engined predecessor, the twin powerplants provided an increase in thrust by roughly 60 percent.

Further modifications were made to the structure of the airframe in order to reduce overall weight, increasing its performance further, as well as adding an additional fuel tank occupying the space of the G.91T's rear seat to provide extra range. Combat manoeuvrability was improved via the addition of automatic leading edge slats. Despite the aircraft's increased range, it could also carry a payload up to 75 percent greater than that of the earlier G.91. The avionics equipment of the G.91Y was also heavily revised and upgraded; various American, British and Canadian systems were sourced and produced under licence in Italy.

=== Flight testing and production ===
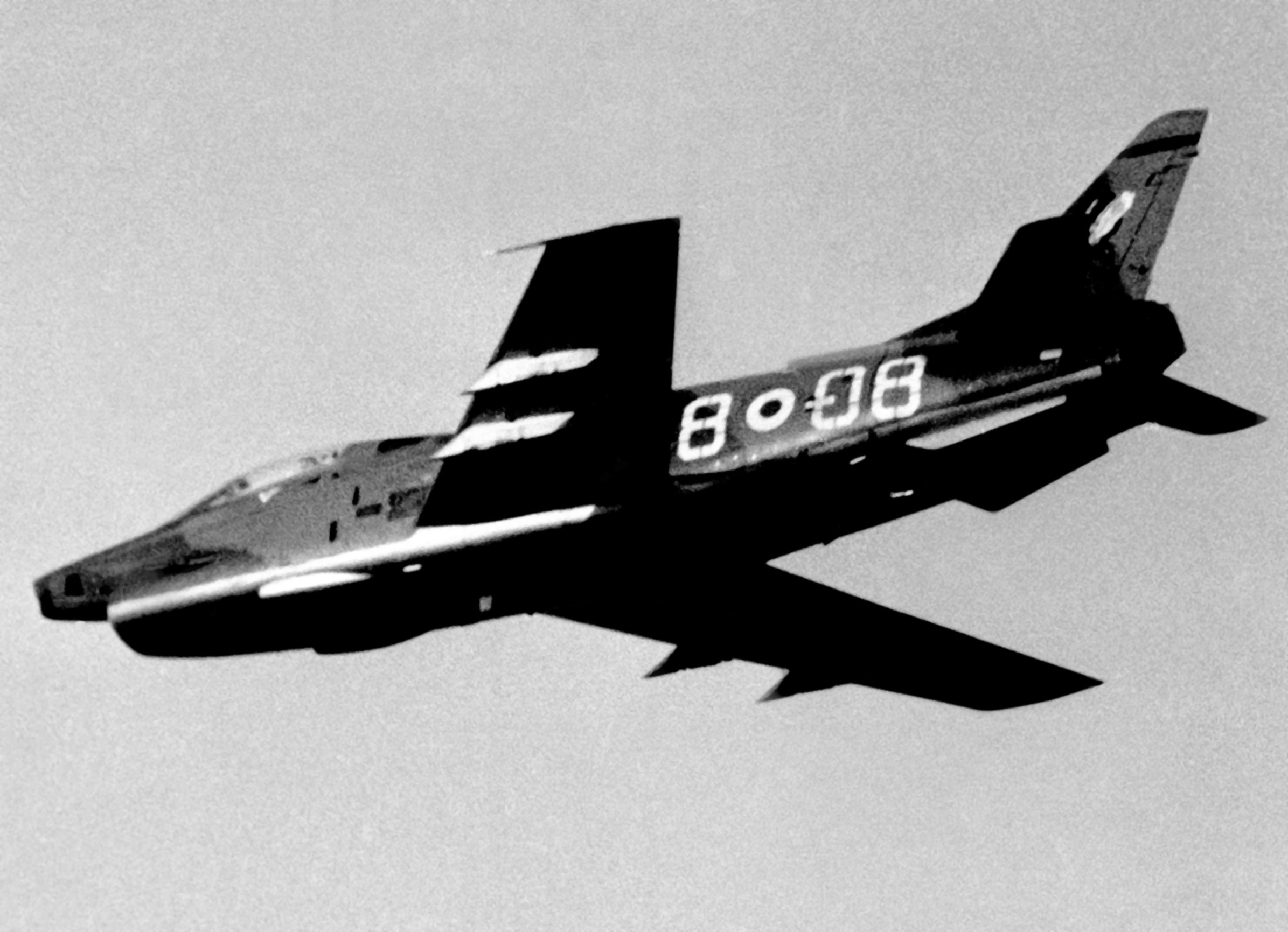
A Fiat G.91Y of 1° Gruppo, 8° Stormo in 1985

On 12 December 1966, the G.91Y performed its maiden flight. A total of three pre-production aircraft underwent flight testing. During one test flight, a pre-production G.91Y attained a maximum speed of Mach 0.98. The type successfully displayed its improvement in speed, range, payload, and manoeuvrability. One observation made during flight testing was the encountering of buffeting when the pre-production aircraft was flown at high speeds; this was rectified on the production aircraft by raising the position of the tailplane slightly.

During March 1971, an initial order of 55 aircraft for the Italian Air Force was completed by Fiat, by which time the company had changed its name to Aeritalia (from 1969, when Fiat aviazione merged with Aerfer). The order was increased to 75 aircraft with 67 eventually being delivered. In fact, the development of the new G.91Y was relatively protracted, with the first order being for about 20 pre-series examples that followed the two prototypes. The first pre-series 'Yankee' (the nickname of the new aircraft) flew in July 1968.

The Italian Air Force (AMI) placed orders for two batches; 35 fighters followed by another 20, later cut to 10. The last one was delivered around mid 1976, making a total of two prototypes, 20 pre-series and 45 series aircraft. No export success followed. These aircraft served with 101° Gruppo/8° Stormo (Cervia-S.Giorgio) from 1970, and later, from 1974, they served with the 13° Gruppo/32° Stormo (Brindisi). Those 'Gruppi' (Italian equivalent of British 'squadrons', usually equipped with 18 aircraft) lasted until the early '90s, as the only ones equipped with the 'Yankee', using them as attack/reconnaissance machines, both over ground and sea, until the AMX replaced them.

== Variants ==
- G.91Y - Prototype and production aircraft.
- G.91YT - Projected two-seat trainer variant.
- G.91YS - Prototype with enhanced avionics and extra hardpoints to carry AIM-9 Sidewinder missiles for evaluation by Switzerland. First flown on 16 October 1970.

== Operators ==
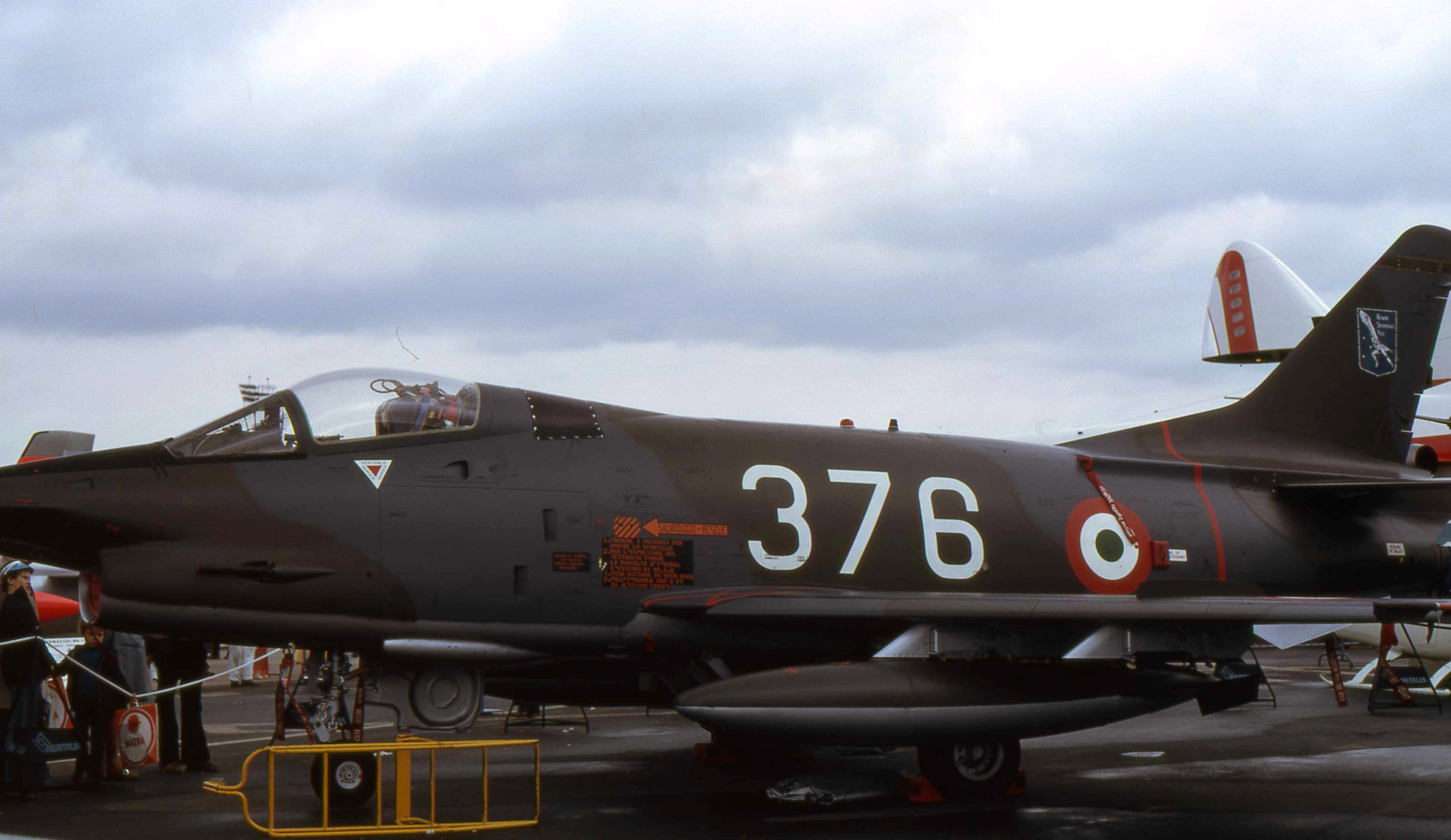
A Fiat G.91Y on static display at the 1973 Paris Air Show

Italy

- Italian Air Force operated 65 Fiat G.91Ys until 1994

== Aircraft on display ==
- A Fiat G.91Y is preserved and on public display at the Italian Air Force Museum, Vigna di Valle.
- A Fiat G.91Y is the gate guardian at the Antonio Locatelli High school in Bergamo, Italy.

== Specifications (G.91Y) ==
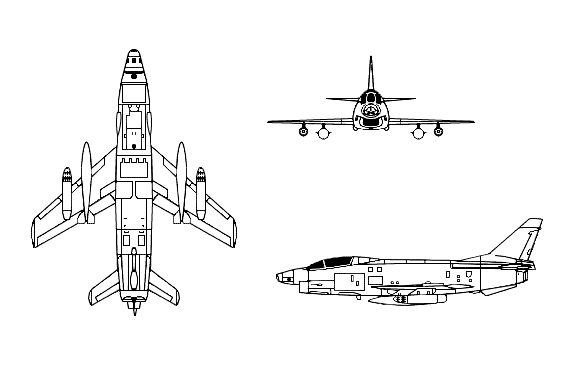
Orthographically projected diagram of the Fiat G.91Y

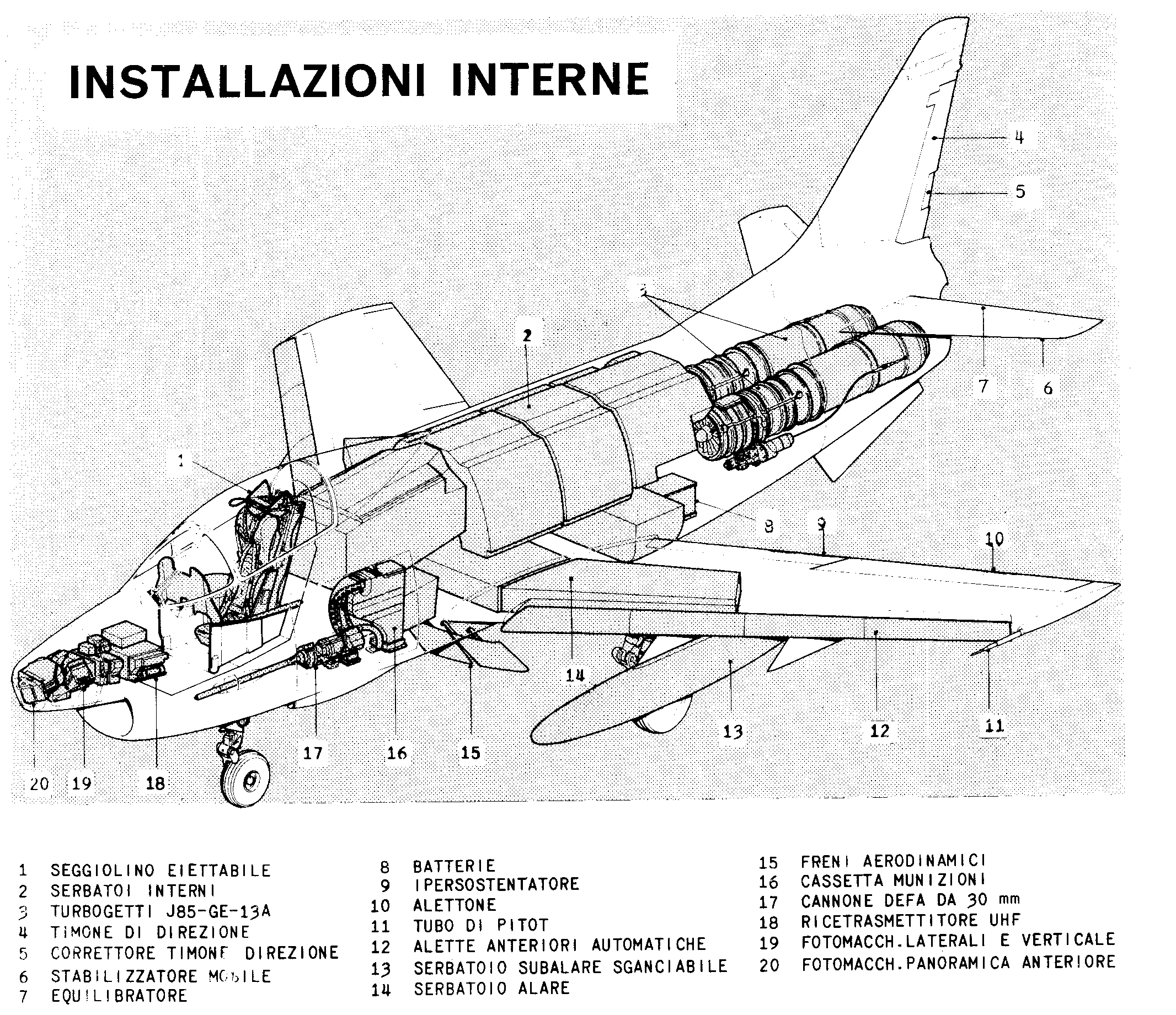
Labelled diagram of the G.91Y

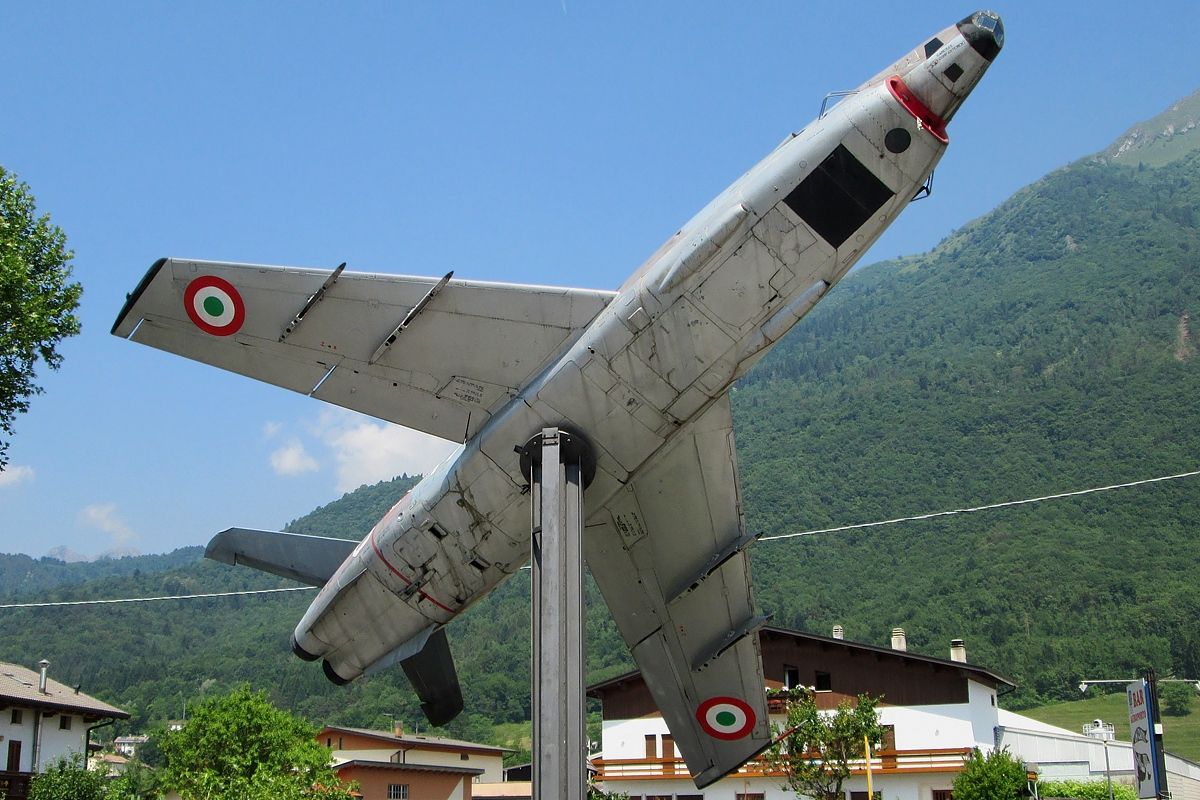
Underside of a preserved G.91Y

Data from The Observer's Book of Aircraft.

General characteristics

- Crew: 1
- Length: 11.67 m (38 ft 3 in)
- Wingspan: 9.01 m (29 ft 7 in)
- Height: 4.43 m (14 ft 6 in)
- Wing area: 18.13 m^{2} (195.1 sq ft)
- Airfoil: root: NACA 65A112; tip: NACA 65A111
- Empty weight: 3,900 kg (8,598 lb)
- Gross weight: 7,800 kg (17,196 lb)
- Max takeoff weight: 8,700 kg (19,180 lb) maximum overload
- Powerplant: 2 × General Electric J85-GE-13A afterburning turbojet engines, 12.12 kN (2,725 lbf) thrust each dry, 18.15 kN (4,080 lbf) with afterburner

Performance

- Maximum speed: 1,110 km/h (690 mph, 600 kn) at sea level
- Maximum speed: Mach 0.95 at 10,000 m (32,800 ft)
- Cruise speed: 630 km/h (390 mph, 340 kn)
- Ferry range: 3,400 km (2,100 mi, 1,800 nmi) with drop tanks
- Service ceiling: 12,500 m (41,000 ft)
- Rate of climb: 86 m/s (17,000 ft/min)
- Wing loading: 480 kg/m^{2} (98 lb/sq ft)
- Thrust/weight: 0.43

Armament

- Guns: 2 × 30 mm (1.18 in) DEFA cannons
- Hardpoints: four under-wing pylon stations with a capacity of 1,814 kg (4,000 lb)

== See also ==
Related development

- Fiat G.91

Aircraft of comparable role, configuration, and era

- ALR Piranha
- Douglas A-4 Skyhawk
- IAR-93 Vultur
- SEPECAT Jaguar
- Soko J-22 Orao

Related lists

- List of fighter aircraft
