= Étendard =

Étendard (French, literally "standard" - a banner, and especially a military banner) may refer to:

== Aircraft ==
- Dassault Étendard
- Dassault Étendard II
- Dassault Étendard IV
- Dassault Étendard VI
- Dassault-Breguet Super Étendard

== Other uses ==
- Étendard (train), which ran between Paris and Bordeaux
- Étendard de Brest, a basketball club based in Brest, France
- Pic de l'Étendard, a mountain in France
