= Dassault Étendard =

French aircraft manufacturer Dassault used the name Étendard ("Standard", in the sense of a flag or banner) for a family of related aircraft projects beginning in the late 1950s. Versions that at least reached prototype stage were:

- Dassault Étendard II, a prototype for the French Air Force
- Dassault Étendard IV, a strike fighter produced for the French Navy
- Dassault Étendard VI, an unsuccessful competitor in the NBMR-1 NATO fighter competition
- Dassault Super Étendard, a derivative of the Étendard IV that served with Argentine Naval Aviation, French Naval Aviation and the Iraqi Air Force.

== See also ==
- Argentine Super Etendard fleet, fleet of Dassault Super Etendard strike aircraft used by Argentina
