= Strike fighter =

Multirole combat aircraft

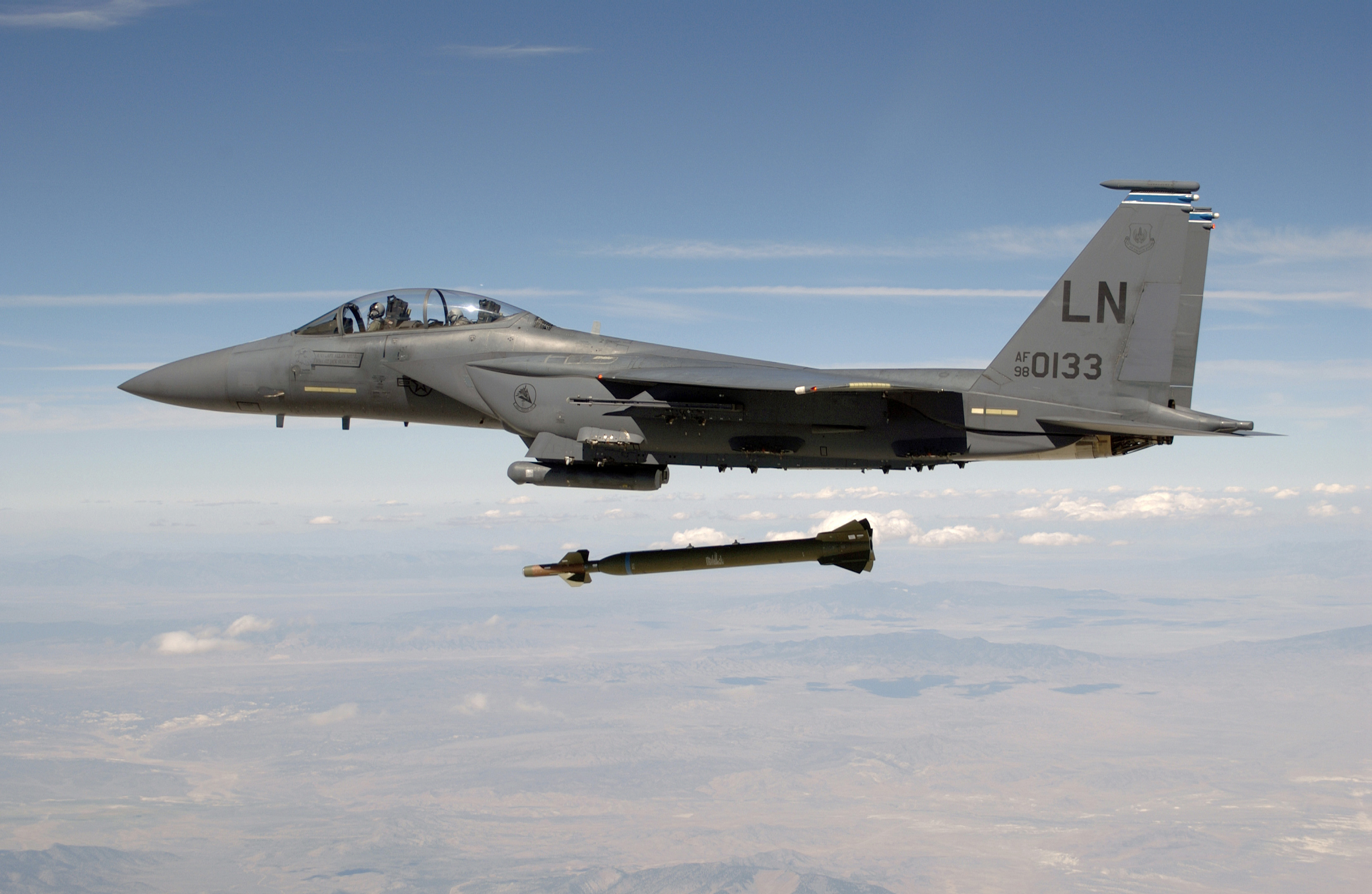
A USAF F-15E Strike Eagle dropping a GBU-28 precision guided bomb.

In current military parlance, a strike fighter is a multirole combat aircraft designed to operate both as an attack aircraft and as an air superiority fighter. As a category, it is distinct from fighter-bombers, and is closely related to the concept of interdictor aircraft, although it puts more emphasis on aerial combat capabilities.

Examples of notable contemporary strike fighters are the American McDonnell Douglas F-15E Strike Eagle, Boeing F/A-18E/F Super Hornet and Lockheed F-35 Lightning II, the Russian Sukhoi Su-34, and the Chinese Shenyang J-16 Chinese Shenyang J-15DT.

== History ==
Beginning in the 1940s, the term "strike fighter" was occasionally used in navies to refer to fighter aircraft capable of performing air-to-surface strikes, such as the Westland Wyvern, Blackburn Firebrand and Blackburn Firecrest.

The term "light weight tactical strike fighter (LWTSF)" was used to describe the aircraft to meet the December 1953 NATO specification NBMR-1. Amongst the designs submitted to the competition were the Aerfer Sagittario 2, Breguet Br.1001 Taon, Dassault Étendard VI, Fiat G.91 and Sud-Est Baroudeur.

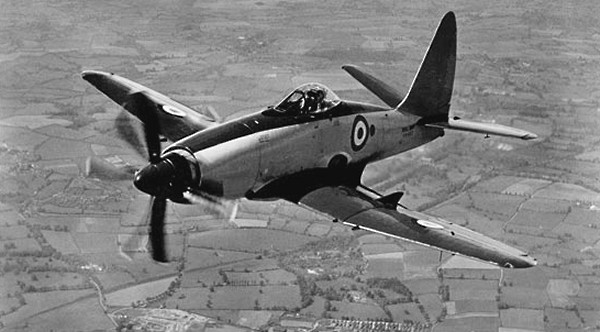
The Westland Wyvern

The term entered normal use in the United States Navy by the end of the 1970s, becoming the official description of the new McDonnell Douglas F/A-18 Hornet. In 1983, the U.S. Navy even renamed each existing Fighter Attack Squadron to Strike Fighter Squadron to emphasize the air-to-surface mission (as the "Fighter Attack" designation was confused with the "Fighter" designation, which flew pure air-to-air missions).

This name quickly spread to non-maritime use. When the F-15E Strike Eagle came into service, it was originally called a "dual role fighter", but it instead quickly became known as a "strike fighter".

=== Joint Strike Fighter ===
In 1995, the U.S. military's Joint Advanced Strike Technology program changed its name to the Joint Strike Fighter program. The project consequently resulted in the development of the F-35 Lightning II family of fifth generation multirole fighters to perform ground attack, reconnaissance, and air defense missions with stealth capability.

== Modern strike fighters ==
- (United States) Boeing F/A-18E/F Super Hornet
- (United States) McDonnell Douglas F-15E Strike Eagle
- (United States) Boeing F-15EX Eagle II
- (United States) Lockheed Martin F-35 Lightning II
- (Russia) Sukhoi Su-34
- (China) Shenyang J-16
- (China) Shenyang J-15DT

== See also ==
- Interdictor aircraft
- Interceptor aircraft
- Fighter-bomber
- Attack aircraft
- Multirole combat aircraft
