= Flight 548 =

Flight 548 may refer to:

- Sabena Flight 548, crashed in 1961 approaching Brussels Airport
- British European Airways Flight 548, crashed in 1972 after takeoff from Heathrow, London
