= Werner Krüger =

German aircraft engineer (1910–2003)

- Born: November 23, 1910; Kolberg, Poland
- Died: October 21, 2003 (aged 92); Göttingen, Germany
- Education: Aerodynamische Versuchsanstalt, AVA
- Occupations: German engineer and innovator
- Known for: Krueger flap

Werner Krüger (November 23, 1910 – October 21, 2003) was a German engineer who invented the Krueger flap in 1943. He evaluated Krueger (Krüger) flaps in the wind tunnels of Göttingen Aerodynamische Versuchsanstalt, AVA in 1944. Krueger flaps are aircraft lift enhancement devices fitted under the leading edge of an aircraft wing where a portion of the lower wing is rotated out in front of the main wing leading edge. Boeing flight tested Krueger flaps on the B-707 prototype on 15 July 1954 and first used Krueger flaps in production for the B-727 maiden flight on 9 February 1963. Leading edge Krueger flaps enhance wing's low speed lift production especially on swept wing aircraft.

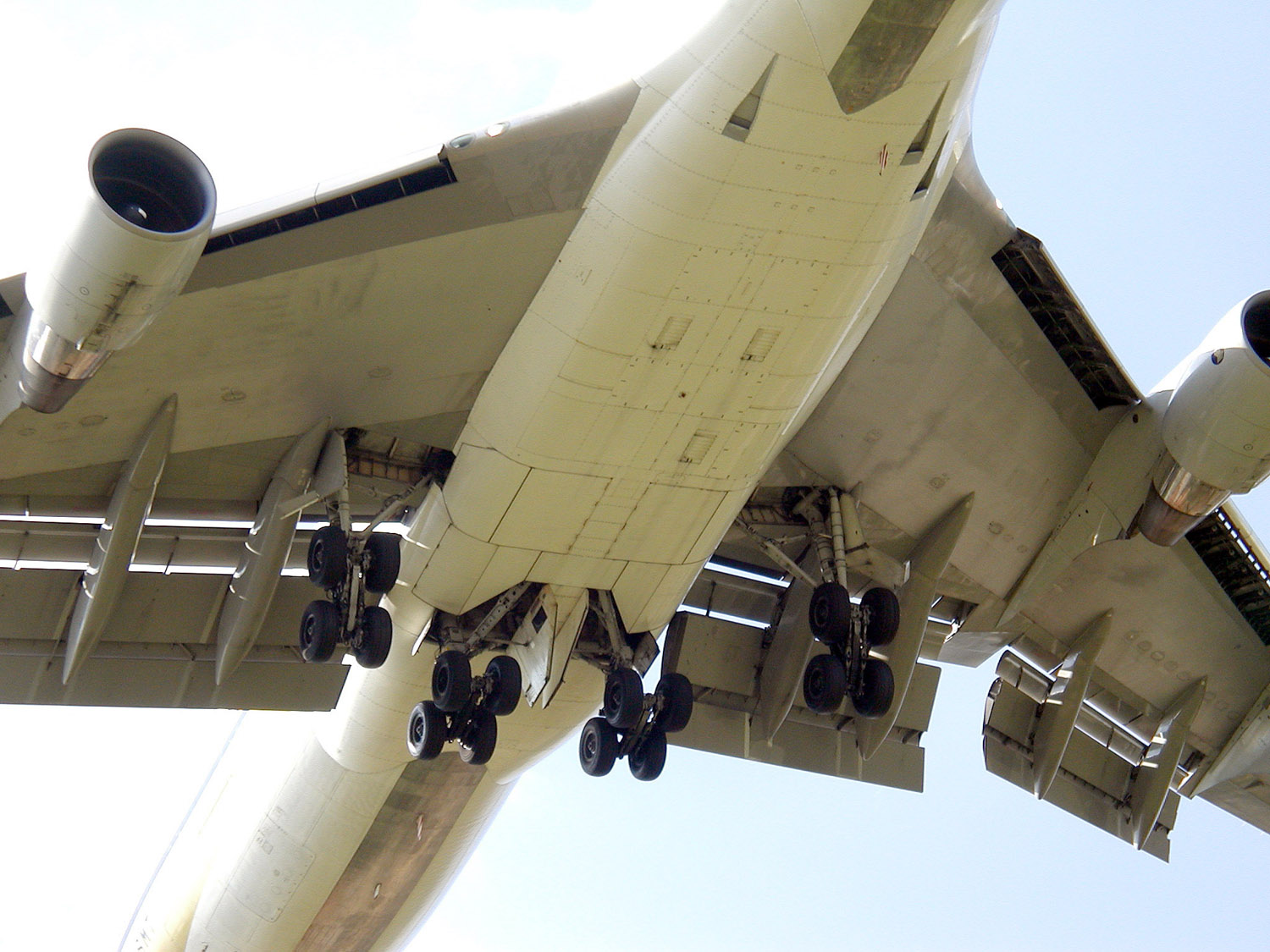
Krueger flaps deployed from the leading edge of a Boeing 747 (top left and right in photo

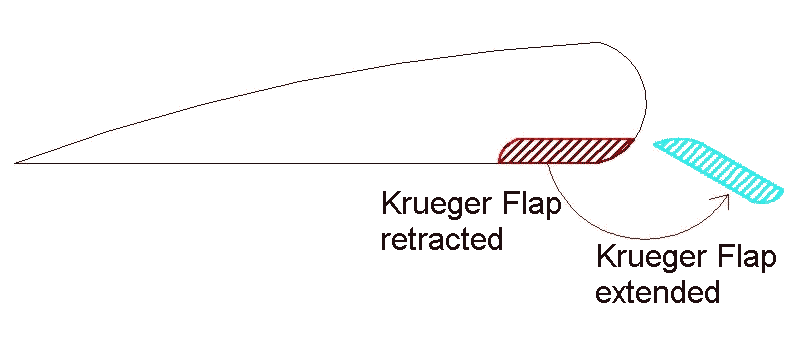
Krueger-Flap
