= SNCASE Baroudeur =

1953 lightweight fighter aircraft

Baroudeur
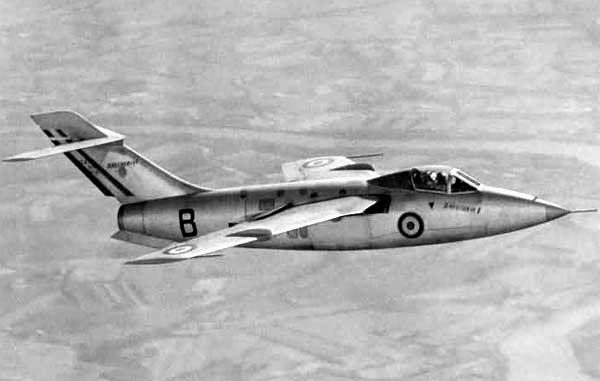
- SNCASE Baroudeur in flight

General information
- Type: Lightweight fighter
- National origin: France
- Manufacturer: SNCASE
- Designer: W. J. Jakimiuk
- Number built: 5

History
- First flight: 1 August 1953

The SNCASE S.E.5000 Baroudeur (French: Adventurer or French Foreign Legion slang for 'brawling soldier') was a single-engined lightweight fighter designed and produced by the French aircraft manufacturer SNCASE (Sud-Est).

Development was initiated in response to difficulties encountered operating conventional jet fighters during the Korean War, which motivated the firm to work on the aircraft as a private venture. The Baroudeur differed from most fighters of the era by being designed to operate from austere grass airstrips and with minimised take-off and landing distances, as opposed to increasingly lengthy runways. The Baroudeur was a relatively unorthodox design due to it intentionally lacking any conventional landing gear, instead using a wheeled trolley during take-off while landing was performing on three retractable skids.

On 1 August 1953, the first prototype performed its maiden flight. Two prototypes and three pre-production aircraft, designated S.E.5003, were produced. The Baroudeur was competitively evaluated for the NATO Basic Military Requirement 1 (NBMR-1), which sought a common "Light Weight Strike Fighter". The French Air Ministry also showed some interest in the aircraft. However, it was not selected to fulfil NBMR-1, nor did any other customers place orders for the type; consequently, the Baroudeur did not progress beyond the prototype phase of development.

== Design and development ==
The Baroudeur was conceived of by George Hereil, the president of the French aircraft manufacturer SNCASE, in response to tactical reports from the Korean War that had emphasised the difficulty of operating modern fighters. Throughout the early 1950s and the opening portion of the Cold War, military aircraft were expanding in size, weight, and complexity, necessitating the widespread adoption of ever-longer runways amongst other infrastructure changes. In contrast, the principal rationale of producing a lightweight fighter that was optimised for operating from austere grass airstrips was to permit tactical jet interceptors to operate from unprepared sites in the event of the developed air bases being destroyed in a preemptive strike (drawing from the German experience in the latter portion of World War II). The Baroudeur was pursued as a private venture. The lead engineer on the project was Wsiewołod "John" Jakimiuk, a Polish aeronautical engineer who had worked on similar concepts at PZL and Avro Canada.

The general configuration of the Baroudeur was a broadly conventional shoulder-wing monoplane that was furnished with a 38 degree swept wing and tail surfaces; the wing was equipped with automatic slats. It had a single-piece high-mounted horizontal stabiliser that was reminiscent of the Soviet Mikoyan-Gurevich MiG-15 fighter. The wing was covered by an unmachined plain skin and its structure comprised a single spar, various ribs and false spars. The fuselage skin consisted of eight large panels while its structure relied on main and secondary frames without any use of longerons. The cockpit was pressurised and the pilot provisioned with an ejector seat. The Baroudeur was powered by a single SNECMA Atar 101C turbojet engine, which was installed within the rear of the fuselage and was supplied with air via intakes embedded into the wing roots. In-flight, the Baroudeur was relatively agile and was fully-stressed to perform all manoeuvres while carrying a full load and at sea level. It was primarily designed to perform ground attack missions.

Perhaps the most noticeable feature of the Baroudeur was its lack of conventional landing gear. Early on in development, it was planned for the aircraft to be catapult-launched. However, this arrangement was dispensed with in favour of a wheeled trolley, which proved to be both cheaper and more practical. When taking off from grass airstrips, the Baroudeur used the trolley, the layout of which was akin to nose-wheel landing gear. Furthermore, the aircraft's three skids (which were cast out of a magnesium alloy and furnished with steel shoes) could be used when taking off from snow- or ice-covered surfaces; two of these skids were positioned next to the wing's leading edge and were retractable, while the third skid was located beneath the tail and was fixed. Towards the rear of the main skids were controllable claws that were used to maintain stability while landing on wet or slippery surfaces. Furthermore, the skids incorporated a crude suspension/damping system that was composed of rubber rings, while the three-wheeled trolley had provision to use rockets (either two or four according to terrain, in addition to two back-up units) for additional thrust during the take-off run. The keel of the fuselage was reinforced to withstand an emergency landing. In contrast to the Messerschmitt Me 163 Komet, a German wartime rocket-powered interceptor aircraft, the Baroudeur's method of taking-off and landing was primarily focused on achieving a reduction in the runway length required (specifically, to less than 3,000 feet), rather than to reduce either the weight or drag of the aircraft, although such a meaningful reduction was achieved nonetheless.

On 1 August 1953, the first of two prototypes performed its maiden flight at Istres Air Base; the second prototype was completed in February 1954. They were followed by three pre-production aircraft, designated S.E.5003, which were powered by the improved Atar 101D engine. The French Air Ministry took an interest in the Baroudeur, necessitating a series of proving trials to be conducted ahead of any acceptance of the aircraft or further orders. However, no production aircraft were ever constructed as the Baroudeur never received a production order.

== Operational testing ==
Extensive testing was conducted by test pilot Pierre Maulandi and, despite the limited funding available that troubled the development of the prototypes, the Baroudeur demonstrated several promising characteristics. According to Maulandi, flying the Baroudeur was less worrying than typical jet aircraft due to it being able to land in virtually any large field. It proved capable of flight with its take off trolley in place, which permitted the aircraft to readily switch to another unprepared airstrip, as well as being able to take off using the skids (albeit dependent upon terrain suitability and occasionally the use of the RATO rockets for extra thrust). Across its flight test programme, the Baroudeur proved capable of landing on beaches (specifically La Baule beach) as well as frozen lakes, motorways, and even marshes.

The Baroudeur could managed barely supersonic speeds, reaching 1,135 km/h (705 mph) while flying in the vicinity of Istres Air base. Testing had included several high speed runs with a mocked-up crude rocket-propelled aircraft (with straight wings and some working controls) on the real rocket-powered trolley, complete with final separation at over 160 km/h (100 mph). On one such occasion, the test pilot suffered concussion and light injuries when the trolley cartwheeled at high speed and became unmanageable.

The Baroudeur was one of several aircraft to be submitted to fulfil NATO's Basic Military Requirement 1 (NBMR-1), although the aircraft had not been specifically designed to meet the accompanying specification for a common light tactical support aircraft. However, following an 18-month evaluation process alongside seven other competing submissions, the Baroudeur was not selected for the requirement, the aircraft to be ultimately selected to fulfil NBMR-1 was the Italian Fiat G.91.

Following the discontinuation of development, the five prototype and preproduction Baroudeurs were disposed of as gunnery targets at Cazaux airforce base in south-west France but a non-profit concern organisation (Ailes Anciennes Le Bourget, with ties to Le Bourget Air Museum) managed to scavenge most of the remains of three or four wrecks to create one SE 5003 in display condition.

== Variants ==
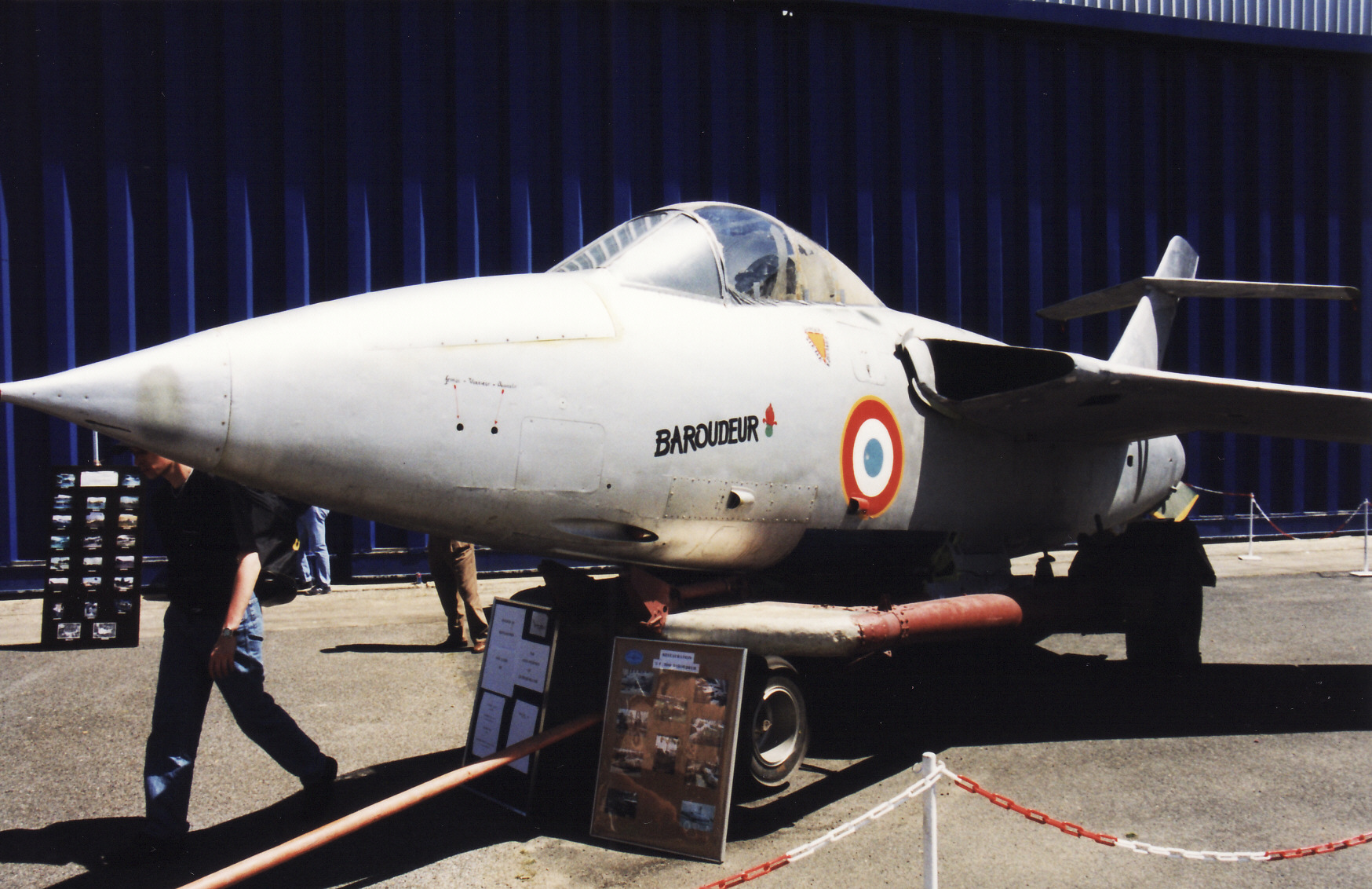
SNCASE Baroudeur at Paris Air Show, 19 June 1999.

S.E.5000 Baroudeur
Prototype powered by a SNECMA Atar 101C turbojet, two built.
S.E.5003 Baroudeur
Pre-production aircraft powered by a SNECMA Atar 101D turbojet, three built.

== Specifications (S.E.5003) ==
Data from

General characteristics

- Crew: 1 (pilot)
- Length: 13.49 m (44 ft 3 in)
- Wingspan: 10.00 m (32 ft 10 in)
- Height: 3.04 m (10 ft 0 in) on skids
- Gross weight: 6,920 kg (15,256 lb)
- Powerplant: 1 × SNECMA Atar 101D turbojet, 29.4 kN (6,614 lbf) thrust

Performance

- Maximum speed: 1,140 km/h (709 mph, 616 kn)

== See also ==
Aircraft of comparable role, configuration, and era

- Breguet Taon
- Fiat G.91
- Folland Gnat
