= Bréguet 1100 =

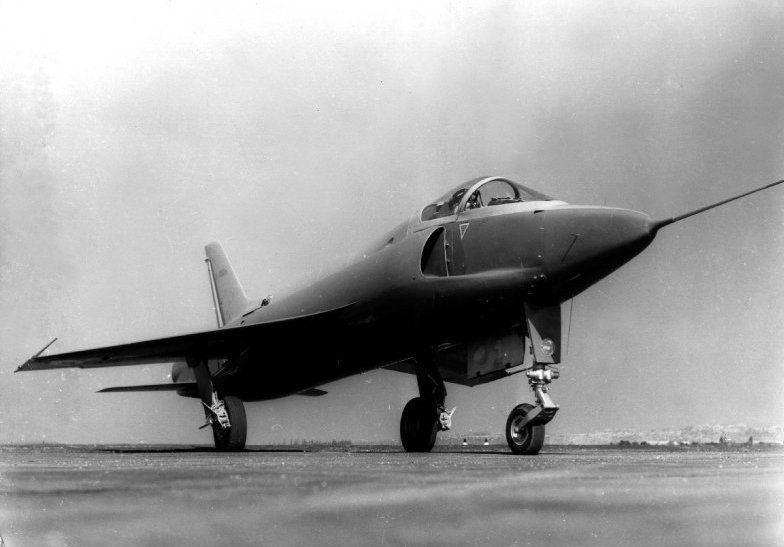

General information
- Type: Single-seat light tactical fighter and ground-attack aircraft
- National origin: France
- Manufacturer: Bréguet Aviation
- Number built: 1

History
- First flight: 31 March 1957

The Bréguet 1100 was a twin-engine French light fighter also suitable for ground-attack and built for the French armed forces. First flown in 1957, only one was completed as budget cuts led to cancellation of the programme.

== Design and development ==
The single-engine Bréguet 1001 Taon was designed and built for a NATO fast ground-attack fighter competition. The Bréguet 1100 was a development designed instead to a French Ministère de l'Air (English: Air Ministry) specification, which called for two engines and a pressurised cockpit in an aircraft performing a similar role. The 1100 flew before the Taon, as the latter was delayed to incorporate the new area rule late in its construction.

The Bréguet 1100 was built entirely from bonded alloy and included many honeycomb structures. Its swept wing was about 15% greater in span and 35% greater in area than that of the Taon, though it was intended that production Taons would share the 1100's wing. The 1100 had broad chord, short-span ailerons and narrow, long-span flaps with spoilers in front of them. The two types had similar side air intakes but the 1100's twin mid-fuselage engines and jet pipes meant that the fuselage was broader and lacked any area rule waisting, as well as being rather longer. They also shared similar swept, straight-edged tail surfaces, cockpits in the nose with narrow fairings running over the length of the upper fuselage and tricycle landing gear.

Sixteen different armament packages were available, including four 12.7 mm (0.5 in) Browning machine guns, two 30 mm (1.2 in) DEFA cannon, 35 Matra unguided rockets or a pack of fifteen 68 mm (2.7 in) SNEB 22 rockets.

The 1100 first flew on 31 March 1957, exceeding Mach 1. This first prototype was the only one to fly as the second was abandoned when 80% complete and an ordered third prototype, a navalized version designated 1100M, was not begun. Before mid-1959 the Bréguet 1100 programme had been cancelled due to government spending cuts.

== Variants ==
Bréguet 1100
First two prototypes, second unfinished.
Bréguet 1100M
Navalized third prototype: not built.

== Specifications (1100) ==
Data from The Complete Book of Fighters

General characteristics

- Crew: 1
- Length: 12.52 m (41 ft 1 in)
- Wingspan: 7.83 m (25 ft 8 in)
- Height: 4.35 m (14 ft 3 in)
- Wing area: 19.52 m^{2} (210.1 sq ft)
- Empty weight: 3,793 kg (8,362 lb) equipped
- Gross weight: 6,545 kg (14,429 lb)
- Powerplant: 2 × Turbomeca Gabizo axial flow turbojet, 11.87 kN (2,668 lbf) thrust each dry, 14.71 kN (3,307 lbf) with afterburner

Performance

- Maximum speed: 1,128 km/h (701 mph, 609 kn) at sea level
- Maximum speed: Mach 0.92

== Bibliography ==
- Cuny, Jean & Leyvastre, Pierre (1977). Les Avions Breguet (1940/1971). DOCAVIA (in French). Vol. 6. Paris: Editions Larivière. OCLC 440863702.
- Lacaze, Henri (2016). Les avions Louis Breguet Paris [The Aircraft of Louis Breguet, Paris] (in French). Vol. 2: le règne du monoplan. Le Vigen, France. ISBN 978-2-914017-89-3.
