= British European Airways Flight 548 =

1972 aircraft accident in England

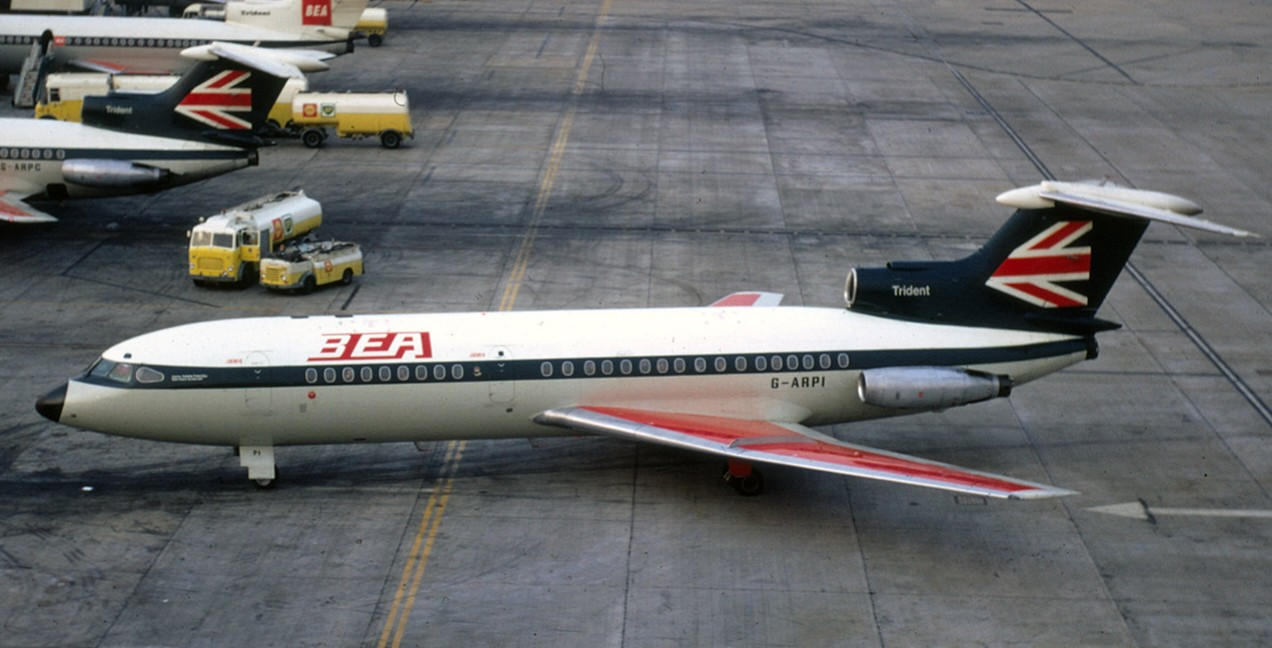
- G-ARPI, the aircraft involved in the accident, photographed in 1969

Accident
- Date: 18 June 1972
- Summary: Deep stall shortly after takeoff due to pilot error, possible incapacitation
- Site: Staines, England, UK; 51°26′21″N 0°30′32″W

Aircraft
- Aircraft type: Hawker Siddeley Trident 1C
- Operator: British European Airways
- IATA flight No.: BE548
- ICAO flight No.: BEA548
- Call sign: BEALINE 548
- Registration: G-ARPI
- Flight origin: Heathrow Airport
- Destination: Brussels Airport
- Occupants: 118
- Passengers: 112
- Crew: 6
- Fatalities: 118
- Survivors: 0

British European Airways Flight 548 was a scheduled passenger flight from London Heathrow to Brussels that crashed near Staines, England, United Kingdom, shortly after take-off on 18 June 1972, killing all 118 people on board. The accident became known as the Staines air disaster. As of 2026, it remains the deadliest air accident (as opposed to terrorist incidents) to have occurred in the UK and was the deadliest air accident involving a Hawker Siddeley Trident. Initially, there were two survivors of the accident; a man, who was discovered in the remains of the aircraft cabin, and a young woman, but both later died of their injuries.

The aircraft had entered a deep stall in the third minute of its flight and had then descended steeply until it crashed into the ground, narrowly missing a busy main road. The public inquiry principally blamed the captain for failing to maintain airspeed and configure the high-lift devices correctly. It also cited the captain's undiagnosed heart condition and the limited experience of the co-pilot while noting an unspecified "technical problem" that the crew apparently resolved before take-off.

The crash took place against the background of an impending pilots' strike that had strained relations between crew members. The strike had also disrupted services, causing Flight 548 to be loaded to the maximum weight allowable. Recommendations from the inquiry led to the mandatory installation of cockpit voice recorders (CVR) in British-registered airliners. Another recommendation was for greater caution before allowing off-duty crew members to occupy flight deck seats. Some observers felt that the inquiry was unduly biased in favour of the aircraft's manufacturers.

== Industrial relations background ==
On Monday 19 June 1972, the day following the accident, the International Federation of Air Line Pilots' Associations (IFALPA) had declared, as a worldwide protest, a strike action against aircraft hijacking, which had become commonplace in the early 1970s. Support was expected, but the British Air Line Pilots Association (BALPA) organised a postal ballot to ask members at British European Airways (BEA) whether they wanted to join the strike. Because of the impending strike, travellers had amended their plans to avoid disruption, and as a result Flight 548 was full despite Sunday being traditionally a day of light travel.

BALPA was also in an industrial dispute with BEA over pay and conditions. The dispute was controversial, those in favour of strike action being mainly younger pilots and those against mostly older. A group of twenty-two BEA Trident co-pilots known as supervisory first officers (SFOs) were already on strike, citing their low status and high workload. To help train newly qualified co-pilots, SFOs were told to occupy only the third flight-deck seat of the Trident as a "P3", operating the aircraft's systems and helping the captain (known as "P1" on the BEA Trident fleet) and the co-pilot ("P2") who handled the aircraft. In other airlines and aircraft, the job of SFO/P3 was usually performed by flight engineers. As a result of being limited to the P3 role, BEA Trident SFOs/P3s were denied experience of aircraft handling, which led to loss of pay, which they resented. In addition, their status led to a regular anomaly: experienced SFO/P3s could only assist while less-experienced co-pilots actually flew the aircraft.

=== Captain Key's outburst ===
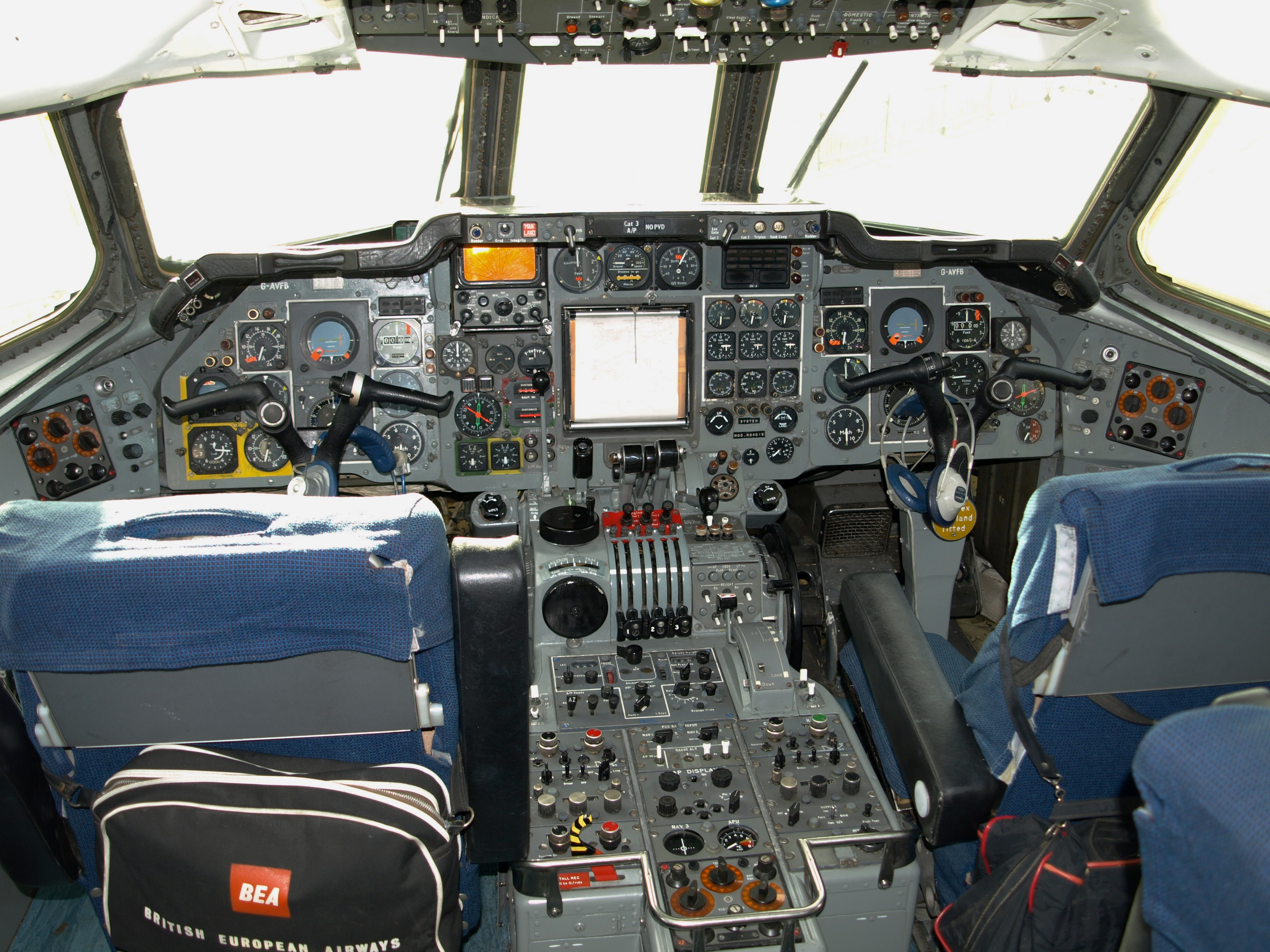
The flight deck of a Hawker Siddeley Trident

Tensions came to a head shortly before the accident. Three days earlier, on 15 June, a captain complained that his inexperienced co-pilot "would be useless in an emergency." Upset, the co-pilot committed a serious error on departure from London Heathrow, setting the high-lift devices fully down instead of up. The mistake was noted and remedied by the SFO, who related the event to colleagues as an example of avoidable danger. This became known among BEA pilots as the "Dublin Incident."

An hour and a half before the departure of Flight 548, its rostered captain, Stanley Key, a former Royal Air Force pilot who had served during the Second World War, was involved in a quarrel in the crew room at Heathrow's Queens Building with a first officer named Flavell. The subject was the threatened strike, which Flavell supported and Key opposed. Both of Key's flight deck crew on Flight 548 witnessed the altercation, and another bystander described Key's outburst as "the most violent argument he had ever heard." Shortly afterward, Key apologised to Flavell and the matter seemed closed.

Key's anti-strike views had won enemies, and graffiti against him had appeared on the flight decks of BEA Tridents, including the incident aircraft, G-ARPI (Papa India). (Note: The aircraft is commonly referred to as Papa India from the phonetic spelling of the last two letters of its civil registration, G-ARPI.) The graffiti on Papa India's flight engineers' desk was analysed by a handwriting expert to identify who had written it, but this could not be determined. The public inquiry found that none of the graffiti had been written by crew members on Flight 548 on the day of the accident.

== Operational background ==
The aircraft operating Flight 548 was a Hawker Siddeley Trident Series 1 short- to medium-range three-engined airliner. This particular Trident (s/n 2109) was one of twenty-four de Havilland D.H.121s (the name "Trident" was not introduced until September 1960) ordered by BEA in 1959 and was registered to the corporation in 1961 as G-ARPI. By the time of Papa India's first flight on 14 April 1964, de Havilland had lost their separate identity under Hawker Siddeley Aviation, and the aircraft was delivered to BEA on 2 May 1964. The Trident I was equipped with three interconnected high-lift devices on each wing leading edge—two leading-edge droop flaps outboard and a Krueger flap on the section closest to the fuselage.

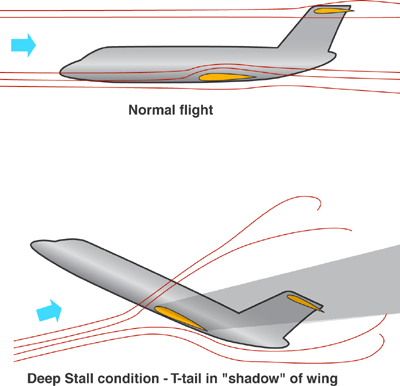
Diagrammatic representation of a deep stall

While technically advanced, the Trident (and other aircraft with a T-tail arrangement) had potentially dangerous stalling characteristics. If its airspeed was insufficient, and particularly if its high-lift devices were not extended at the low speeds typical of climbing away after take-off or of approaching to land, it could enter a deep stall (or "superstall") condition in which the tail control surfaces become ineffective (as they are in the turbulence zone of the stalled main wing) from which recovery was practically impossible.

The danger first came to light in a near-crash during a 1962 test flight, when de Havilland pilots Peter Bugge and Ron Clear were testing the Trident's stalling characteristics by pitching its nose progressively higher, thus reducing its airspeed. The Trident entered a deep stall after a critical angle of attack was reached. Eventually, it entered a flat spin and appeared to be about to crash, but a wing dropped during the stall, and when corrected with rudder the other wing dropped. The aircraft continued rolling left and right until the nose pitched down and the crew were able to recover to normal flight. The incident resulted in the Trident being fitted with an automatic stall warning system known as a "stick shaker" and a stall recovery system known as a "stick pusher," which automatically pitched the aircraft down to build up speed if the crew failed to respond to the warning.

These systems were the subject of a comprehensive stall programme, involving some 3,500 stalls, being performed by Hawker Siddeley before the matter was considered resolved by the Air Registration Board. The stall warning and recovery systems tended to over-react: of ten activations between the Trident entering service and June 1972, only half were genuine, although in the previous 6 1/2 years there had been no false activations when an aircraft was in the air. When BEA Trident pilots were questioned informally by one captain, over half of the pilots said that they would disable the protection systems on activation rather than let them recover the aircraft to a safe attitude. Random checks carried out by BEA after the accident showed that this was not the case; twenty-one captains stated that they had witnessed their co-pilots react correctly to any stall warnings.

=== Felthorpe accident ===
The Trident's potential to enter a deep stall was highlighted in the crash of Trident 1C G-ARPY on 3 June 1966 near Felthorpe, Norfolk, during a test flight, with the loss of all four pilots on board. In this accident, the crew had deliberately switched off both the stick shaker and stick pusher as required by the stall test schedule, and the probable cause was determined to be the crew's failure to take timely positive recovery action to counter an impending stall. The Confidential Human Factors Incident Reporting Programme (CHIRP), an experimental, voluntary, anonymous and informal system of reporting hazardous air events introduced within BEA in the late 1960s (and later adopted by the Civil Aviation Authority and the Federal Aviation Administration), brought to light two near-accidents, the "Orly" and "Naples" incidents: these involved flight crew error in the first case and suspicion of the Trident's control layout in the second case.

=== Orly (Paris) incident ===
In December 1968, the captain of a Trident 1C departing Orly Airport for London tried to improve climb performance by retracting the flaps shortly after take-off. This was a non-standard procedure, and shortly afterward, he also retracted the leading-edge droops. This configuration of high-lift devices at a low airspeed would have resulted in a deep stall, but the co-pilot noticed the error, increased airspeed and re-extended the droops, and the flight continued normally. The event became known as the "Paris Incident" or the "Orly Incident" among BEA staff.

=== Naples incident ===
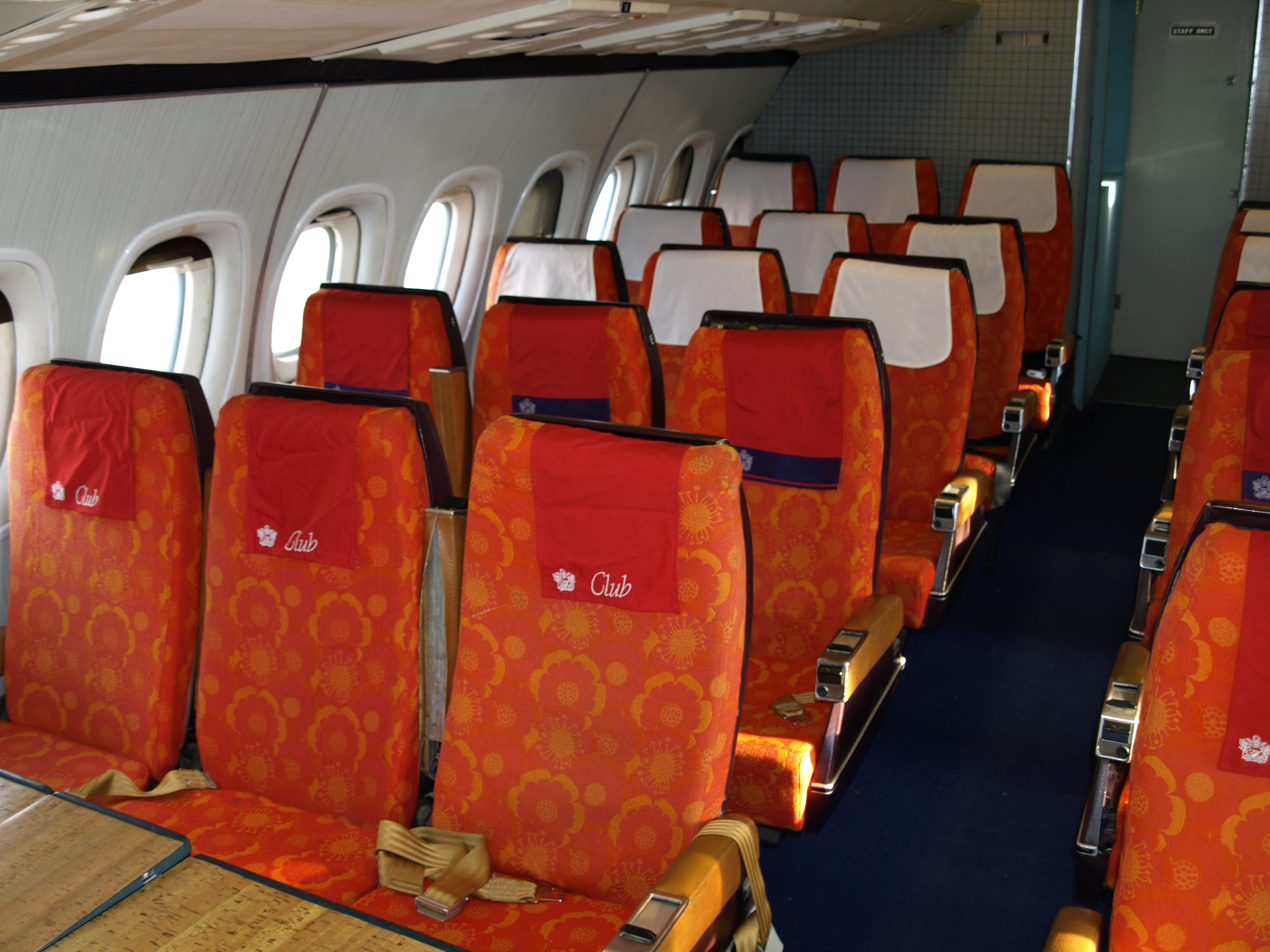
Passenger cabin of Trident 2E, G-AVFH

In the second near-accident, a Trident 2E (G-AVFH) climbing away from London Heathrow for Naples in May 1970 experienced what was claimed by its flight crew to have been a spontaneous uncommanded retraction of the leading-edge slats which was initially unnoticed by any of them. (Note: The Trident 1 featured drooping leading-edge devices, the Trident 2 employed extending slats. Their aerodynamic effect was similar, and both devices were controlled by the same lever on the flight deck. Crews often referred to both types as 'droops'.) The aircraft's automatic systems sensed the loss of airspeed and lift and issued two stall warnings. Since the crew did not initially detect anything amiss, they disabled the automatic system. While doing so, the co-pilot noticed and immediately remedied the problem by re-extending the retracted slats, and the flight continued normally.

Investigations into this incident found no mechanical malfunction that could have caused the premature leading-edge device retraction, and stated that the aircraft had "just about managed to stay flying." A possible design fault in the high-lift control interlocks came under suspicion, although this was discounted during the investigation into the crash of Flight 548. The event became known as the "Naples Incident" or the "Foxtrot Hotel Incident" (after the registration of the aircraft concerned) within BEA and was examined during the accident inquiry. The forward fuselage of this aircraft involved in the "Naples Incident" is preserved and on public display at the de Havilland Aircraft Heritage Centre, London Colney.

=== Previous ground accident involving G-ARPI ===
An accident affecting G-ARPI had occurred on 3 July 1968. Due to a control failure, an Airspeed Ambassador freight aircraft (G-AMAD) deviated from the runway on landing at Heathrow and struck G-ARPI and its neighbouring sister aircraft, G-ARPT, while they were parked unoccupied near Terminal 1, resulting in six fatalities from the freighter's eight occupants. G-ARPT was cut in two and damaged beyond economic repair; G-ARPI lost its tail fin, which was repaired at a cost of £750,000 (£11.5 million today). G-ARPI performed satisfactorily thereafter, and the incident is thought to have had no bearing on its subsequent crash.

G-ARPI later suffered some minor undercarriage damage as a result of skidding off the runway at Basel during a cross-wind landing on 4 February 1970.

== Crew and passengers ==
Nation	Number
Belgium	29
Canada	3
India	1
Ireland	12
Jamaica	1
Nigeria	1
South Africa	4
Thailand	1
United Kingdom (Note: 28 passengers and 6 crew.)	34
United States	29
Unknown	3
Total	118

The crew on the day of the accident comprised Captain Stanley Key as P1, Second Officer Jeremy Keighley as P2 and Second Officer Simon Ticehurst as P3. Key was aged 51 and had 15,000 flying hours experience, including 4,000 on Tridents. Keighley was aged 22 and had joined line flying a month and a half earlier, with 29 hours as P2. Ticehurst was aged 24 and had over 1,400 hours, including 750 hours on Tridents. The cabin crew consisted of Senior Steward Frederick Farey, 31, Steward Alan Lamb, 24, and Stewardess Jennifer Mowat, 19.

Among the passengers were 29 Americans, 29 Belgians, 28 Britons, 12 Irish, four South Africans and three Canadians. There was also one passenger from each of French West Africa, India, Jamaica, Latin America, Nigeria and Thailand. The passengers included between twenty-five and thirty women and several children.

== Accident ==
Note: All timings in Greenwich Mean Time (GMT) from the official accident report.

=== Departure ===
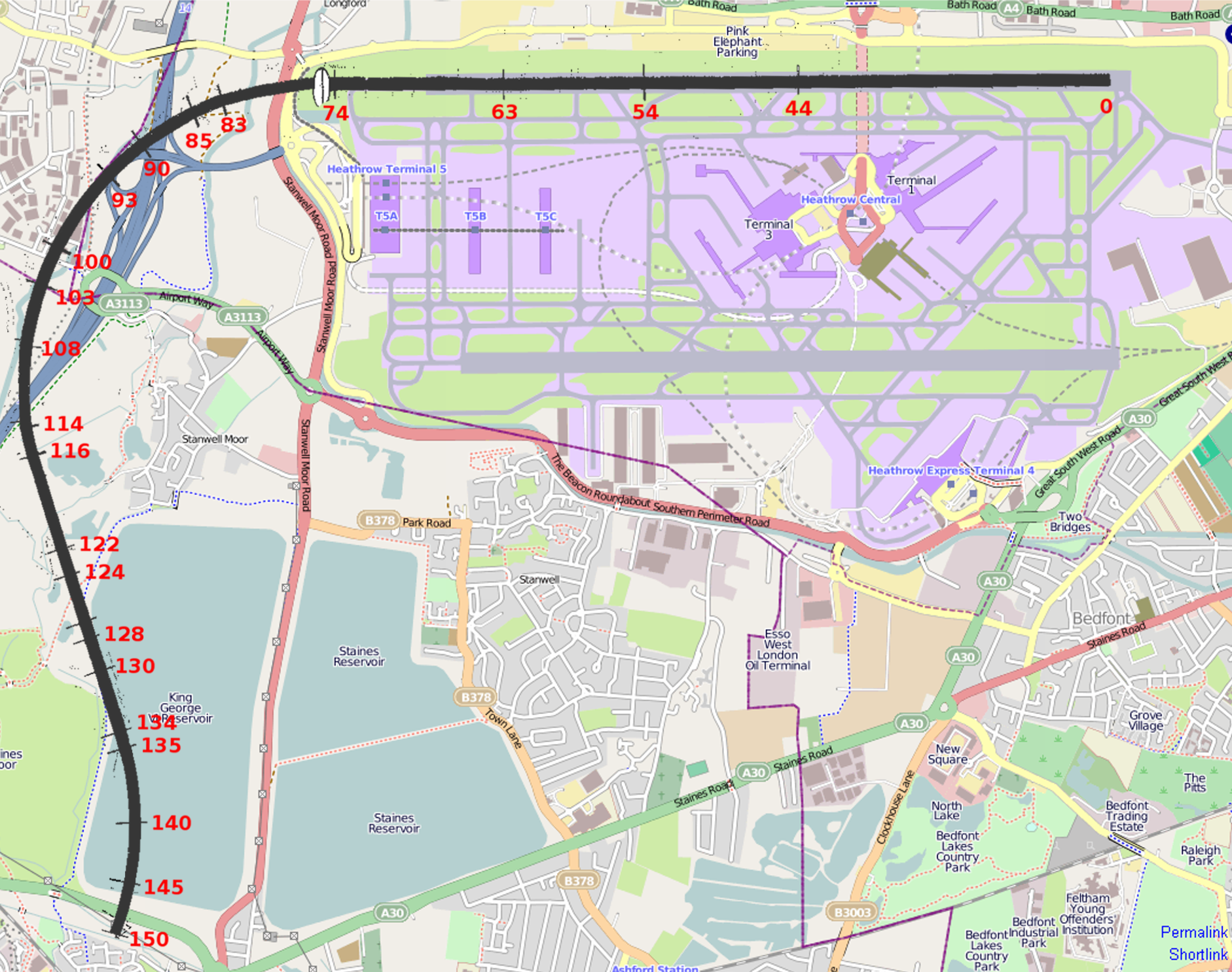
Flight path of BEA Flight 548, superimposed on a map of present-day Heathrow Airport and surrounding areas; the red numbers are times in seconds from brake release.

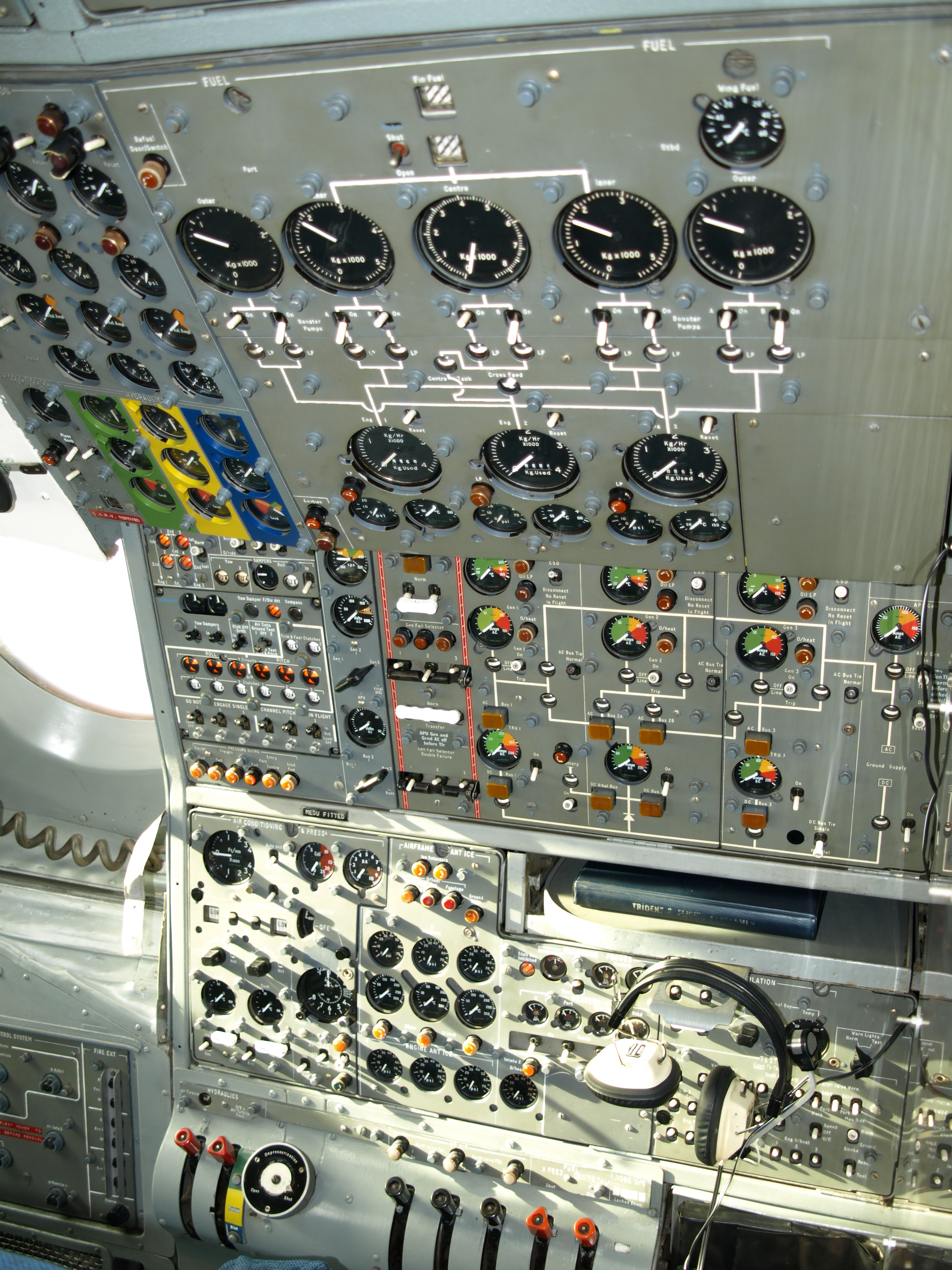
P3 position of a BEA Hawker Siddeley Trident

The flight crew boarded BE 548 (call sign Bealine 548) at 15:20 to prepare for a 15:45 departure.

At 15:36, flight dispatcher J. Coleman presented the load sheet to Key, whose request for engine start clearance was granted three minutes later. As the doors were about to close, Coleman asked Key to accommodate a BEA flight crew that had to collect a Merchantman aircraft from Brussels. The additional weight of the three crew members necessitated the removal of a quantity of mail and freight from the Trident to ensure its total weight did not exceed the permitted maximum of 41,730 kilograms (92,000 lb). This was exceeded by 24 kilograms (53 lb), but as there had been considerable fuel burnoff between startup and takeoff, the total aircraft weight (including fuel) was within the maximum permitted take-off weight.

The "deadheading" crew was led by Captain John Collins, an experienced former Trident first officer, who was allocated the observer's seat on the flight deck. One seat, occupied by a baby, was freed by the mother holding it in her arms.

The doors closed at 15:58 and at 16:00 Key requested pushback. At 16:03 Flight 548 was cleared to taxi to the holding point adjacent to the start of Runway 28 Right. During taxi, at 16:06 the flight received its departure route clearance: a routing known as the "Dover One Standard Instrument Departure". This standard instrument departure involved taking-off to the west over the instrument landing system localiser and middle marker beacon of the reciprocal Runway 10 Left, turning left to intercept the 145° bearing to the Epsom non-directional beacon (NDB) (to be passed at 3,000 feet (910 m) or more), and then proceeding to Dover. Key advised the tower that he was ready for take-off and was cleared to do so. He subsequently reported an unspecified technical problem and remained at the holding point for two minutes to resolve it.

At 16:08 Key again requested and received take-off clearance. A cross wind was blowing from 210° at 17 knots (31 km/h; 20 mph). Conditions were turbulent, with driving rain and a low cloud base of 1,000 feet (300 m); broken cloud was also reported at 600 feet (180 m), and the official report says that the crew would have been without any visual reference at "crucial times" during the flight. At 16:08:30 Flight 548 began its take-off run, which lasted forty-four seconds, the aircraft leaving the ground at an indicated airspeed (IAS) of 145 knots (269 km/h; 167 mph). The safe climb speed (V2) of 152 knots (282 km/h; 175 mph) was reached quickly, and the undercarriage was retracted. After nineteen seconds in the air the autopilot was engaged at 355 feet (108 m) and 170 knots (310 km/h; 200 mph); the autopilot's airspeed lock was engaged even though the actual required initial climb speed was 177 knots (328 km/h; 204 mph).

At 16:09:44 (seventy-four seconds after the start of the take-off run), passing 690 feet (210 m), Key began the turn towards the Epsom NDB and reported that he was climbing as cleared and the flight entered cloud. At 16:10 (ninety seconds), Key commenced a standard noise abatement procedure which involved reducing engine power. As part of this, at 16:10:03 (ninety-three seconds) he retracted the flaps from their take-off setting of 20°. Shortly afterwards, Flight 548 reported passing 1,500 feet (460 m) above ground level and was re-cleared to climb to 6,000 feet (1,800 m). During the turn, the airspeed decreased to 157 knots (291 km/h), 20 knots (37 km/h) below the target speed.

=== Stall warnings ===
At 16:10:24 (114 seconds), the leading-edge devices were selected to be retracted at a height above the ground of 1,770 feet (540 m) and a speed of 162 knots (300 km/h; 186 mph), 63 knots (117 km/h; 72 mph) below the safe droop flap retraction speed of 225 knots (417 km/h; 259 mph). One second afterwards, visual and audible warnings of a stall activated on the flight deck, followed at 16:10:26 (116 seconds) by a stick shake and at 16:10:27 (117 seconds) by a stick push which disconnected the autopilot, in turn activating a loud autopilot disconnect warning horn that continued to sound for the remainder of the flight. Key levelled the wings but held the aircraft's nose up, which kept the angle of attack high, further approaching a stall.

By 16:10:32 (122 seconds), the leading-edge devices had stowed fully into the wing. The speed was 177 knots (328 km/h; 204 mph), and height above the ground was 1,560 feet (475 m), with the aircraft still held into its usual climb attitude. Key continued to hold the nose-up attitude when there was a second stick shake and stick push in the following two seconds. A third stick push followed 127 seconds into the flight but no recovery was attempted. One second later, the stall warning and recovery system was over-ridden by a flight crew member.

At 16:10:39 (129 seconds), the aircraft had descended to 1,275 feet (390 m) and accelerated to 193 knots (357 km/h; 222 mph) as a result of the stall recovery system having pitched the aircraft's nose down to increase airspeed. G-ARPI was in a 16° banked turn to the left, still on course to intercept its assigned route. Key pulled the nose up once more to reduce airspeed slightly, to the normal 'droops extended' climb speed of 177 knots (328 km/h; 204 mph), which further stalled the aircraft.

At 16:10:43 (133 seconds), the Trident entered a deep stall. It was descending through 1,200 feet (365 m), its nose was pitched up by 31°, and its airspeed had fallen below the minimum indication of 54 knots (100 km/h; 62 mph). At 16:10:47 (137 seconds) and 1,000 feet (305 m), the Trident was descending at 4,500 feet per minute (23 m/s). Impact with the ground came at 16:11, 150 seconds after brake release. The aircraft just cleared high-tension overhead power lines and came to rest on a narrow strip of land surrounded by tall trees immediately south of the A30 road, and a short distance south of the King George VI Reservoir near Staines-upon-Thames. A fire broke out during the rescue effort when a cutting apparatus was used.

=== Eyewitnesses and rescue operations ===
There were three eyewitnesses; brothers Paul and Trevor Burke, aged 9 and 13, who were walking nearby, and a motorist who called at a house to telephone the airport.

We were out with the dog and I looked up and saw the plane. It was just coming out of the mist when the engines stalled and it seemed it glided down. It was just like a dream. The plane just fell out of the sky. We just about saw it hit the ground ... because it was right in a clump of trees. When it did hit the ground the front bit hit first and the back bit was just blown away.

— Trevor Burke, Mayday

Air traffic controllers had not noticed the plane's disappearance from radar. Emergency services only became aware of the accident after fifteen minutes and did not know the circumstances for nearly an hour. First on the scene was a nurse living nearby, who had been alerted by the boys, and an ambulance crew that happened to be driving past. A male passenger who had survived the accident was discovered in the aircraft cabin, but died soon after arrival at Ashford Hospital without recovering consciousness. A young girl was also found alive but died at the scene; there were no other initial survivors. Altogether, 30 ambulances and 25 fire engines attended the accident.

Drivers formed heavy traffic jams and were described by Minister of Aerospace Michael Heseltine on BBC Television that evening as "ghouls, unfortunate ghouls". Reports that the public impeded rescue services were dismissed during the inquiry. In addition, some witnesses claimed the traffic jams were the result of the recovery and rescue, during which the police closed the A30 road.

A BEA captain, Eric Pritchard, arrived soon after the bodies had been removed; he noted the condition of the wreckage and drew conclusions:

The aircraft had impacted in a high-nose-up attitude. The No. 2 engine had dug a considerable crater. The tail section was almost if not completely separated from the rest of the airframe. There was little evidence of any forward movement; in fact, the complete aircraft looked intact though distorted and broken, mainly the fuselage. Both wings suffered not much visible damage. I noticed that the droops and flaps were retracted.

— Eric Pritchard, Mayday

The accident was the worst air disaster in the United Kingdom until the Pan Am Flight 103 bombing over Lockerbie, Scotland, in 1988. The crash was the first in the United Kingdom involving the loss of more than 100 lives.

== Investigation and public inquiry ==
On Monday 19 June 1972 Michael Heseltine, Minister for Aerospace told the House of Commons that he had directed a Court of Inquiry, an ad hoc tribunal popularly called a "public inquiry", to investigate and report on the accident. Public inquiries bypassed the usual British practice whereby the Accidents Investigation Branch (AIB) investigated and reported on air crashes, and were held only in cases of acute public interest. On 14 July, the High Court Judge Sir Geoffrey Lane was appointed to preside over the inquiry as Commissioner.

The British aviation community was wary of public inquiries for several reasons. In such inquiries, AIB inspectors were on an equal footing with all other parties, and the ultimate reports were not drafted by them, but by the Commissioner and his or her Assessors. Proceedings were often adversarial, with counsel for victims' families regularly attempting to secure positions for future litigation, and deadlines were frequently imposed on investigators. Pressure of work caused by the Lane Inquiry was blamed for the death of a senior AIB inspector who committed suicide during the inquiry.

=== AIB investigation and coroner's inquest ===
The aircraft's two flight data recorders were removed for immediate examination, and investigations at the site of the accident were completed within a week. The wreckage of Papa India was then moved to a hangar at the Royal Aircraft Establishment in Farnborough, Hampshire, for partial re-assembly aimed at checking the integrity of its flight control systems. An inquest was held into the 118 deaths, opening on 27 June 1972.

A pathologist stated that Captain Key had an existing heart condition, atherosclerosis, and had suffered a potentially distressing arterial event caused by raised blood pressure typical of stress, an event which was often interpreted by the public as a heart attack. It had taken place "not more than two hours before the death and not less than about a minute" according to the pathologist's opinion given as evidence during the public inquiry. In other words, Key could have suffered it at any time between the row in the Queens Building crewroom and ninety seconds after the start of the take-off run (the instant of commencing noise abatement procedures). The pathologist could not specify the degree of discomfort or incapacitation which Key might have felt. Key's medical state continued to be the subject of "conflicting views of medical experts" throughout the inquiry and beyond.

=== Lane Inquiry ===
The public inquiry, known as the "Lane Inquiry", opened at the Piccadilly Hotel in London on 20 November 1972, and continued until 25 January 1973, with a break over Christmas, despite expectations that it would end sooner. It was opened by Geoffrey Wilkinson of the AIB with a description of the accident, and counsel for the relatives of the crew members and passengers then presented the results of their private investigations. In particular, Lee Kreindler of the New York City Bar presented claims and arguments that were considered tendentious and inadmissible by pilots and press reporters. They involved hypotheses about the mental state of Captain Key, conjecture about his physical state (Kreindler highlighted disagreements between US and British cardiologists) and allegations about BEA management. The allegations were delivered using tactics considered as "bordering on the unethical".

The inquiry also conducted field inspections, flew in real Tridents and "flew" the BEA Trident simulator as well as observing the Hawker Siddeley Trident control systems rig. Its members visited the reassembled wreckage of G-ARPI at Farnborough and were followed by the press throughout their movements. The bare facts being more-or-less uncovered soon after the event, the inquiry was frustrated by the lack of a cockpit voice recorder fitted to the accident aircraft. (Note: A full list of inquiry board members, counsel and witnesses is given at Appendix A to the official accident report.)

The stall warning and stall recovery systems were at the centre of the inquiry, which examined in some detail their operation and why the flight crew might have over-ridden them. A three-way air pressure valve (part of the stall recovery system) was found to have been one sixth of a turn out of position, and the locking wire which secured it was missing. Calculations carried out by Hawker Siddeley determined that if the valve had been in this position during the flight then the reduction in engine power for the noise abatement procedure could have activated the warning light that indicated low air pressure in the system. The failure indications might have appeared just prior to take-off and could have accounted for the two-minute delay at the end of the runway. A captain who had flown Papa India on the morning of the accident flight noted no technical problems, and the public inquiry found that the position of the valve had no significant effect on the system.

==== Findings and recommendations ====
The Lane Report was published on 14 April 1973. Speaking in the House of Commons, Heseltine paid tribute to the work done by Mr Justice Lane, Sir Morien Morgan and Captain Jessop for the work they had carried out during the inquiry into the accident.

The inquiry's findings as to the main causes of the accident, were that:

- The captain failed to maintain the recommended airspeed.
- The leading-edge devices were retracted prematurely.
- The crew failed to monitor airspeed and aircraft configuration.
- The crew failed to recognise the reasons for the stall warnings and stall recovery system operation.
- The crew wrongly disabled the stall recovery system.

Underlying causes of the accident were also identified:

- That Captain Key was suffering from a heart condition.
- The presence of Captain Collins on the flight deck might have been a distraction.
- The lack of crew training on how to manage pilot incapacitation.
- The low flying-experience level of Second Officer Keighley.
- Apparent crew unawareness regarding the effects of an aircraft configuration change.
- Crew unawareness regarding the stall protection systems and the cause of the event.
- The absence of a baulk mechanism to prevent droop retraction at too low an airspeed.

Recommendations included an urgent call for cockpit voice recorders and for closer co-operation between the Civil Aviation Authority and British airlines. Although the report covered the state of industrial relations at BEA, no mention was made of it in its conclusions, despite the feelings of observers that it intruded directly and comprehensively onto the aircraft's flight deck. BEA ceased to exist as a separate entity in 1974, when it and the British Overseas Airways Corporation merged to form British Airways. A recommendation of the report that all British-registered civil passenger-carrying aircraft of more than 27,000 kg (60,000 lb) all-up weight should be equipped with cockpit voice recorders resulted in their fitting becoming mandatory on larger British-registered airliners from 1973.

One issue treated as secondary at the inquiry was the presence in the flight deck observer's seat of Captain Collins. The Lane report recommended greater caution in allowing off-duty flight crew members to occupy flight deck seats, and aired speculation that Collins might have been distracting his colleagues. The report noted that Collins' body was found to be holding a can of aerosol air freshener in its right hand. Sources close to the events of the time suggest that Collins played an altogether more positive role by attempting to lower the leading-edge devices in the final seconds of the flight; Eric Pritchard, a Trident captain who happened to be the first airman at the accident site, recalled that a fireman had stated that Collins was lying across the centre pedestal and noted himself that his earphones had fallen into the right-hand-side footwell of the flight deck, diagonally across from the observer's seat, as might be expected if he had attempted to intervene as a last resort.

There were protests at the conduct of the inquiry by BALPA (which likened it to "a lawyers' picnic"), and by the Guild of Air Pilots and Air Navigators which condemned the rules of evidence adopted and the adversarial nature of the proceedings. Observers also pointed to an unduly-favourable disposition by the inquiry to Hawker Siddeley, manufacturer of the Trident, and to the makers of the aircraft's systems. Debate about the inquiry continued throughout 1973 and beyond.

The accident led to a much greater emphasis on crew resource management training, a system of flight deck safety awareness that remains in use today.

== Victims and memorials ==
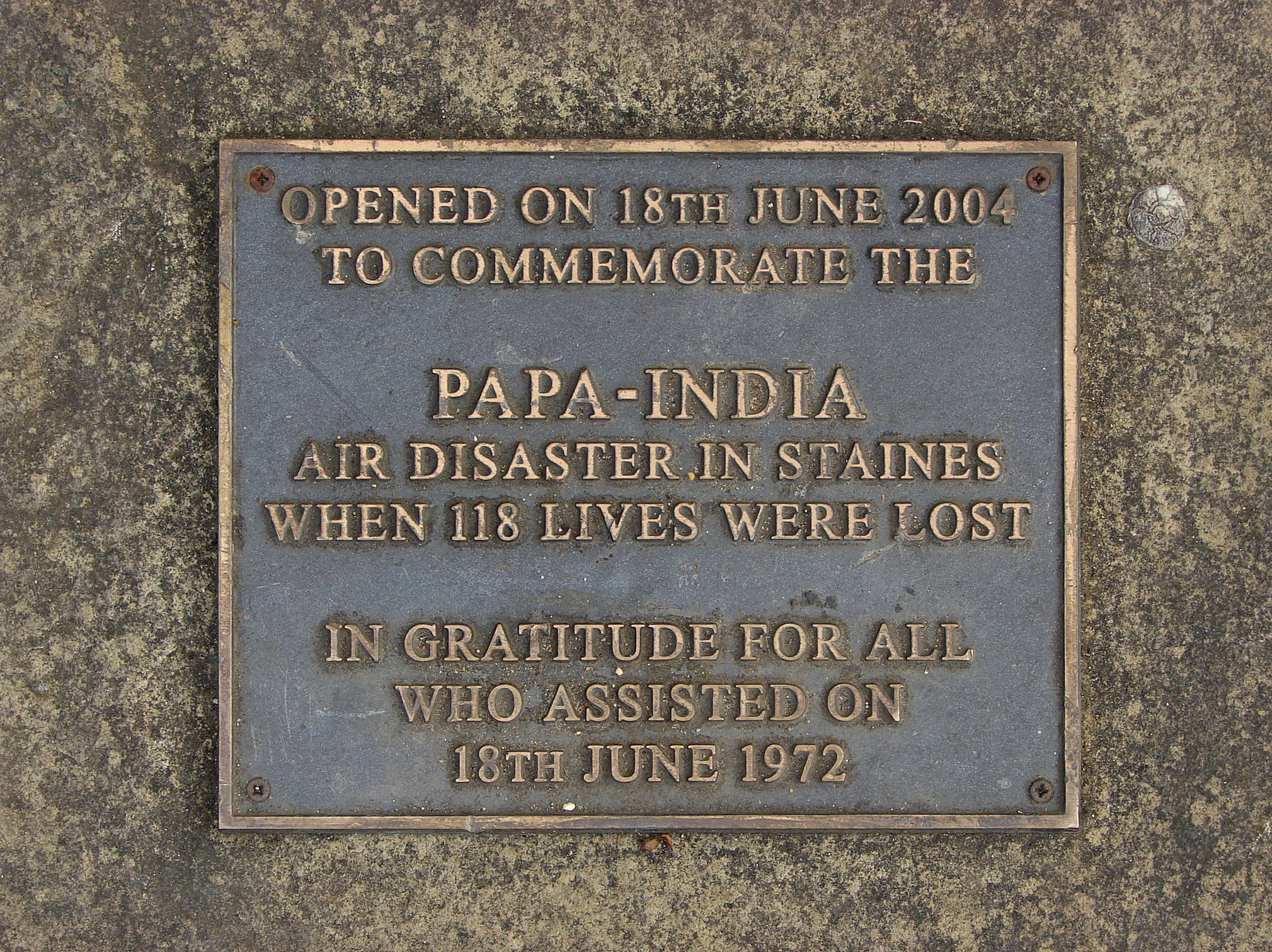
The plaque on the Trident air crash memorial in Waters Drive recreation ground

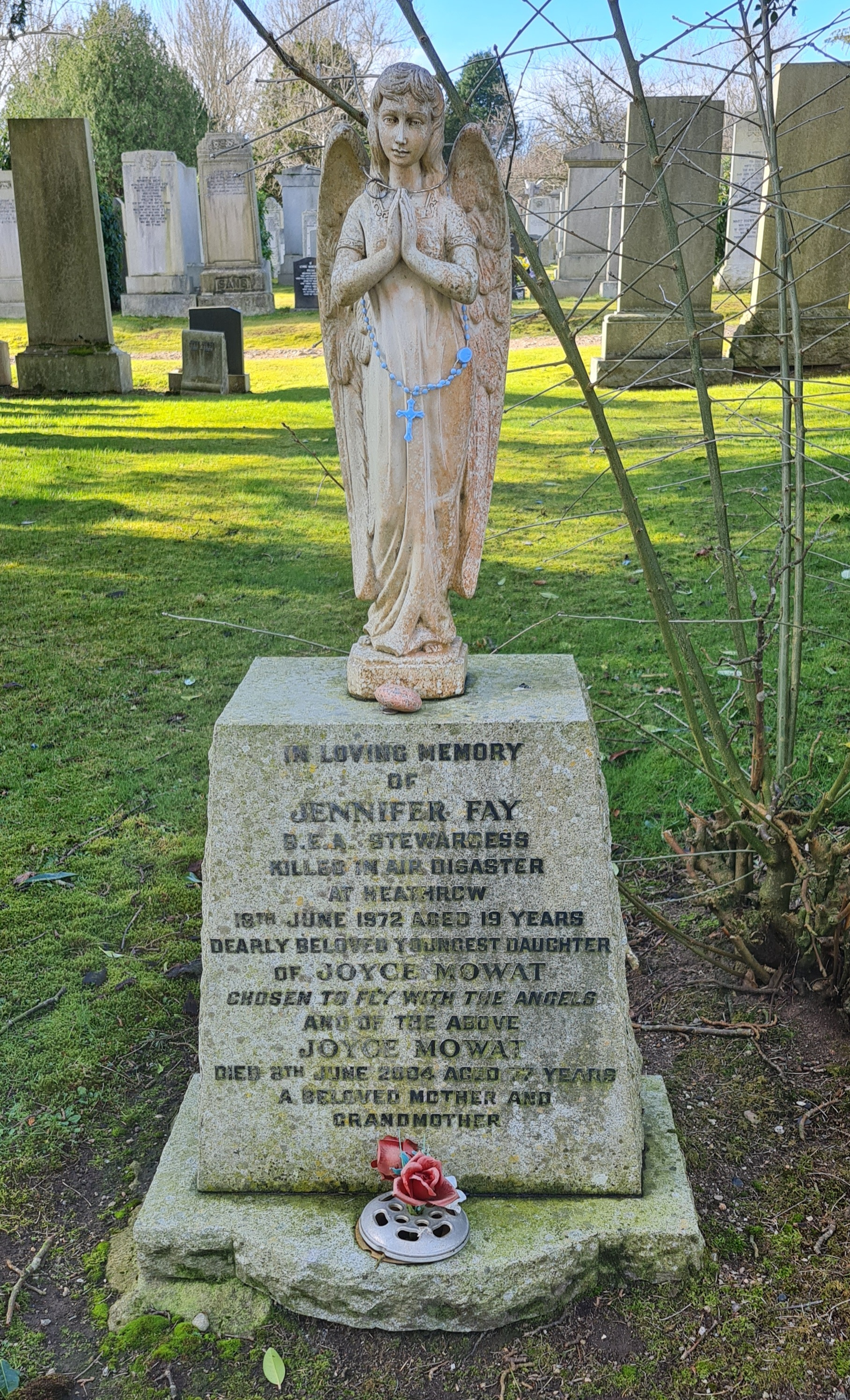
Gravestone of Jennifer Fay Mowat in Springbank Cemetery, Aberdeen

All 118 persons aboard the aircraft were killed: 112 passengers and six crew members. Among the passengers were twelve senior businessmen from Ireland, including the head of the Confederation of Irish Industry, former tennis player Guy Jackson, who were en route to Brussels for meetings preparatory to Irish accession to the European Economic Community. A group of sixteen doctors and senior staff from the Royal London Homeopathic Hospital were also on board, and two memorial benches to them were placed close to the hospital in Queen Square.

Former CIA official Carmel Offie, who had been dismissed for homosexuality, considered to be a security risk factor at the time, was also on board.

Two memorials to all the victims were dedicated on 18 June 2004 in the town of Staines. The first is a stained-glass window in St Mary's Church where an annual memorial service is held on 18 June. The second is a garden near the end of Waters Drive in the Moormede Estate, close to the accident site. On 18 June 2022, the fiftieth anniversary, there was a memorial service attended by relatives of those who died, members of the emergency services, the Lord Lieutenant of Surrey, the local MP, and the chairman of British Airways.

== In popular culture ==
- The story of the accident was featured on the thirteenth season of the Canadian television show Mayday in an episode entitled "Fight to the Death" (known as Air Disasters in the US, and as Air Crash Investigation in the UK and the rest of the world).
- The story was also featured in an episode of Air Crash Confidential produced by World Media Rights. It was partially filmed at the FAST Museum, Farnborough, UK using the cockpit of a Trident 3 (G-AWZI).
