= Leading-edge droop flap =

Aerodynamic device

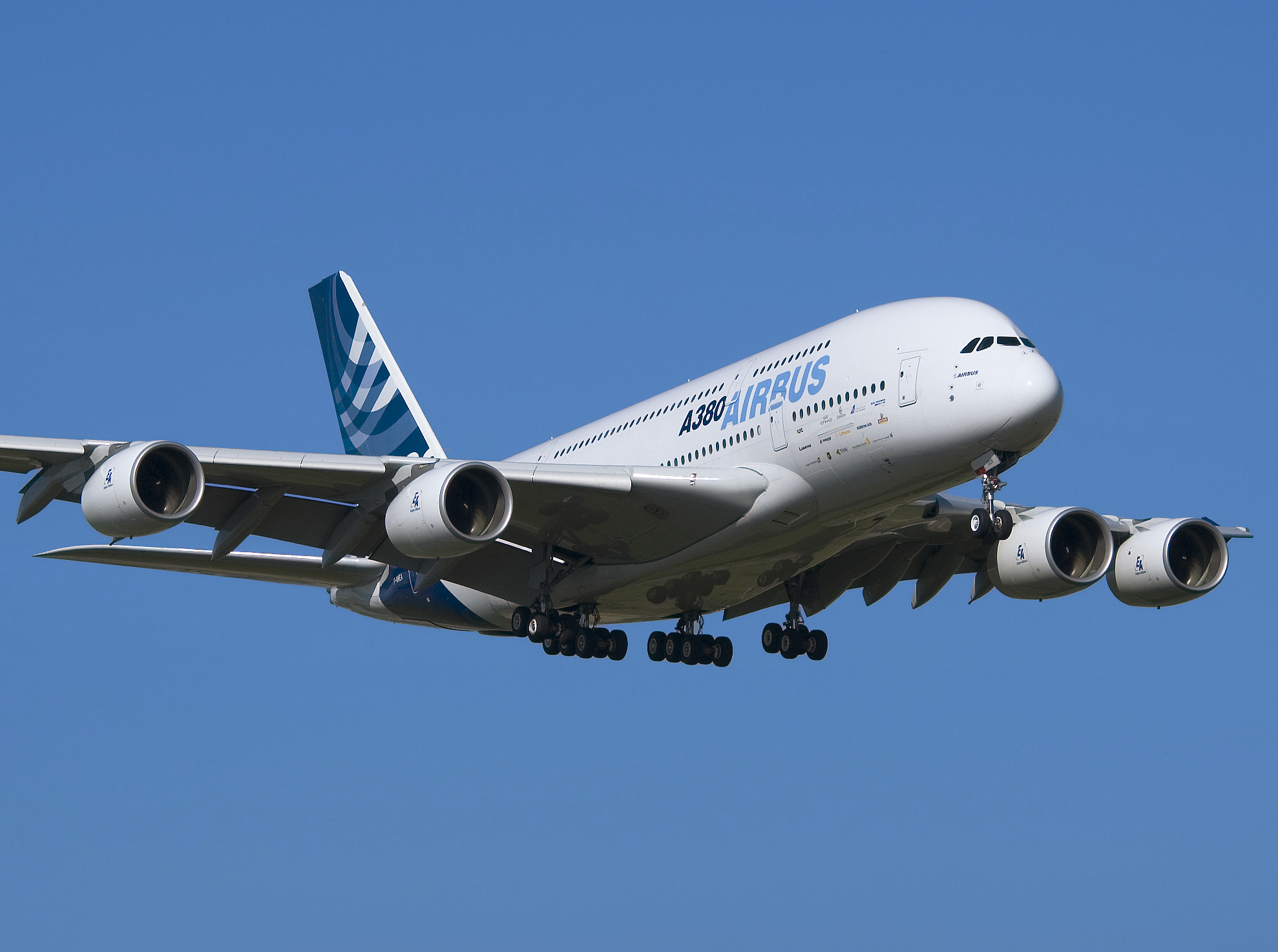
Airbus A380 approaching to land, with deployed droops visible between the fuselage and the inner engines

The leading-edge droop flap is a device on the leading edge of aircraft wings designed to improve airflow at high angles of attack. The droop flap is similar to the leading-edge slat and the Krueger flap, but with the difference that the entire leading edge section rotates downwards, whereas the slat and Krueger flap are panels which move away from the wing leading edge when it is deployed.

== Location ==
A leading-edge droop flap comprises the rounded front part of a wing, in movable form. The Airbus A380 has droop flaps between the fuselage and each inboard engine, at the leading edge of the thickest part of each wing. Early variants of the Hawker Siddeley Trident had two droop flaps on the outboard of each wing and a Krueger flap on the section closest to the fuselage.

== Use and effect ==
Droop flaps function with other high-lift devices on an aircraft to increase the camber of the wing and reduce the stalling speed. On the Airbus A380, the first stage of lift device selection deploys the droop flaps (called droop noses by Airbus) and leading-edge slats located further out on the wing; with the main flaps starting to extend when the second stage is selected. The variable sections on the A380 may be drooped to a position 22 or 25 degrees lower than their stowed position. Another function of droop flaps on the A380 is to change the stall characteristics of the wing. The A380's designers found that the airflow between the engines was separating from the wing surface prior to the airflow between the engine and the fuselage, an undesirable characteristic. Adding droop between the engine and the fuselage fixed the problem; whereas using a leading-edge slat would not have done so because of the gap (or slot) created between a slat and the wing when a slat is deployed.

== Aircraft with droop flaps ==
- Airbus A380
- Airbus A350
- Dassault Falcon 20
- Hawker Siddeley Trident
- Mikoyan-Gurevich MiG-23
- Northrop F-5

== See also ==
- Index of aviation articles
- British European Airways Flight 548 - a Hawker Siddeley Trident crash in which premature retraction of the droop flaps was a factor
- Krueger flap
- Leading-edge extension
- Variable camber wing
