= Bréguet 1001 Taon =

Light French fighter aircraft, 1957

Br.1001 Taon
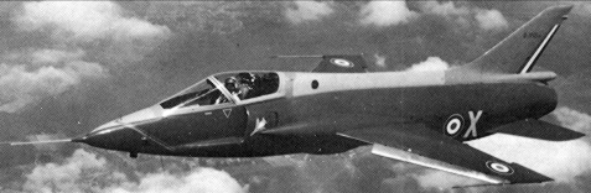

General information
- Type: Single-seat strike fighter
- Manufacturer: Bréguet
- Number built: 2

History
- First flight: 26 July 1957

The Bréguet Br.1001 Taon was a prototype single-seat jet strike fighter aircraft designed and built by the French aircraft manufacturer Bréguet. Its name meant Gadfly in English, but was also an anagram of NATO or the French version OTAN)

The development of the Taon was started in response to the issuing of NATO Basic Military Requirement 1 in 1953. It was a compact monoplane that conformed to the area rule; while sharing some similarities with the Bréguet 1100, the Taon was both shorter and narrower. During 1955, NATO officials announced that the Taon was the front-running submission, leading to an initial order for three aircraft for evaluation purposes. The maiden flight of the type was performed on 26 July 1957. Months later, it underwent competitive evaluation flights against the Fiat G.91 and the Dassault Mystère XXVI, after which the G.91 was declared to be the winner. Ultimately, no operator placed a production order for the type. Despite this outcome, the Taon went on to set two international speed records during 1958. A total of two aircraft were produced prior to development being halted.

== Design and development ==
During 1953, various Western aircraft manufacturers were invited by NATO to submit proposals to fulfil NATO Basic Military Requirement 1 (NBMR-1), which sought an optimal aircraft to perform the Light Weight Strike Fighter (LWSF) role. Bréguet was amongst several companies to produce a response, designing the Taon for the specific purpose of fulfilling this requirement. On 30 June 1955, it was announced that the winning projects were, in order, the Taon, the Fiat G.91 and the Dassault Mystère XXVI.

Accordingly, the company received a contract to build three prototypes. On 26 July 1957, the first aircraft conducted its maiden flight, almost a year later than the competing G.91. It was promptly followed by the second aircraft, which incorporated several improvements and had a slightly longer fuselage. The Taon, along with prototypes of the G.91 and Mystère XXVI, underwent a series of evaluation trials conducted at the Centre d'Essais en Vol at Brétigny-sur-Orge, France, in September 1957. Reportedly, the G.91 demonstrated superior performance to its competitors, and consequently, Fiat's G.91 was officially declared the competition winner in January 1958. Three months later, during a meeting of NATO Defence Ministers, it was agreed that the G.91 would be the first NATO lightweight strike fighter while the Taon would follow in 1961.

In terms of its general configuration, the Taon was a compact mid-wing monoplane with swept wings and tail surfaces, and furnished with a retractable tricycle undercarriage. The design incorporated the recently-discovered area rule, although this decision did prolong its development. While the Taon shared numerous similarities with the Bréguet 1100, such as in the design of the air intakes, tail surfaces, and the cockpit, there were also a lot of differences between the two aircraft, including the Taon possessing a narrower and shorter fuselage as well as being powered by a single engine. It was intended for the unbuilt production version of the Taon to share the same wing as the Bréguet 1100. Power was provided by a single Bristol Orpheus BOr.3 turbojet engine; nine out of the ten designs submitted for the NBMR-1 competition were powered by the Orpheus.

Ultimately, no order was received for the type and Bréguet discontinued development of the Taon, resulting in only two aircraft ever having been built. Bréguet made use of its work on Taon on multiple other projects that did reach quantity production. The SEPECAT Jaguar, an Anglo-French strike aircraft, reused the arrow-shaped wing. Furthermore, the bonded honeycomb construction used on the Taon was shared with the Bréguet 1150 Atlantic maritime patrol aircraft.

== Operational service ==
On 25 April 1958, the Taon set an international speed record for a 1,000 km (620 mi) closed circuit with a speed of 1,046.65 km/h (650.36 mph) at 7,620 m (25,000 ft). On 23 July of that year, it broke the record again at a speed of 1,075 km/h (667.98 mph).

After losing out to the G.91, the Taon did not secure any orders, either from the French Air Force nor any other nation; the French government ultimately preferred to pursue development of the Dassault Étendard VI (derived from the Mystère XXVI).

== Variants ==
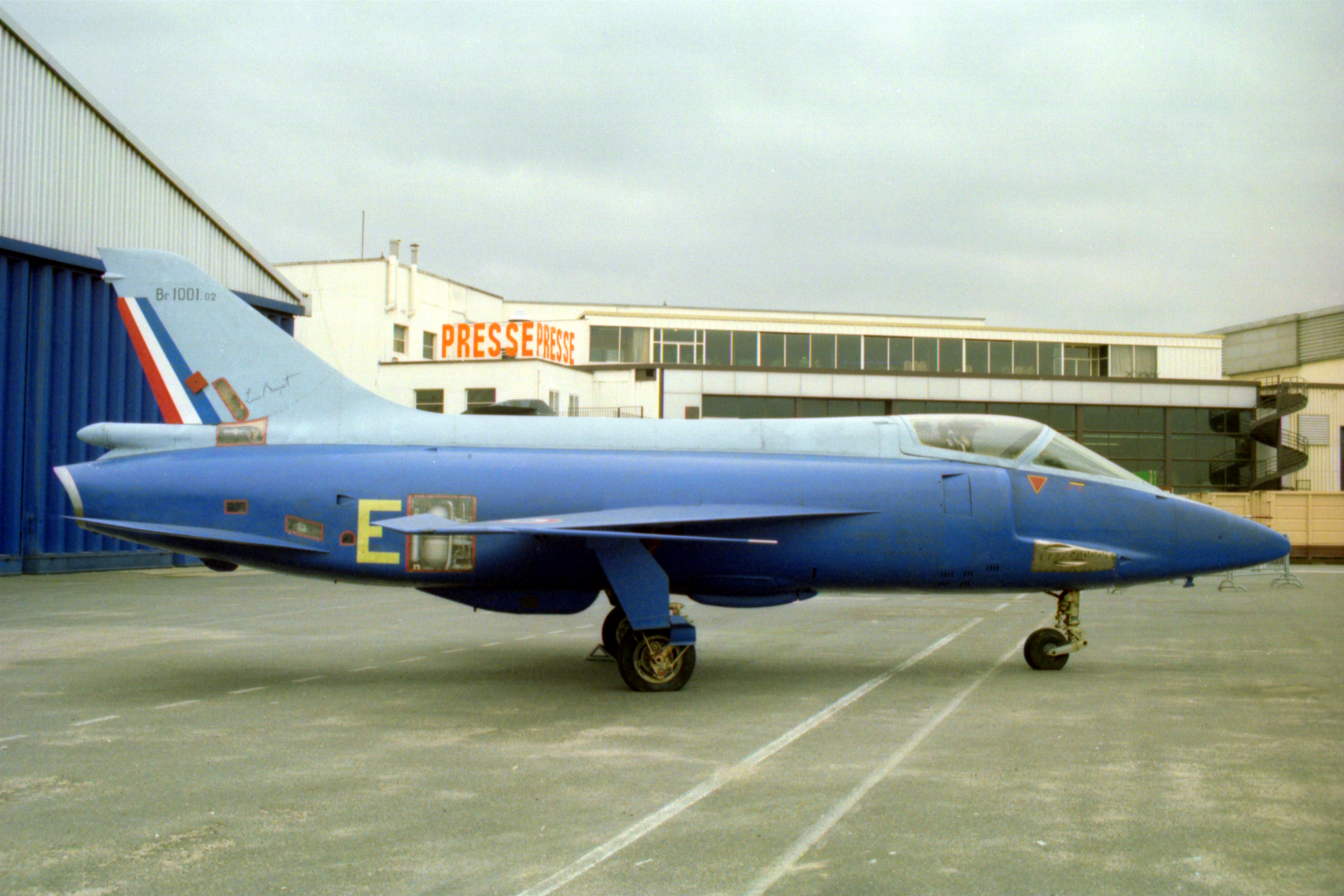
Preserved Taon, 1989

Br.1001
Prototype powered by a Bristol Orpheus BOr.3 engine, two built.

Br.1002
Proposed missile-carrying interceptor, not built.

Br.1004
Proposed production version powered by a Bristol Orpheus BOr.12 engine, not built.

== Specifications (Br.1001 Taon) ==
General characteristics

- Crew: 1
- Length: 11.68 m (38 ft 4 in)
- Wingspan: 6.8 m (22 ft 4 in)
- Height: 3.7 m (12 ft 2 in)
- Wing area: 14.7 m^{2} (158 sq ft)
- Gross weight: 5,000 kg (11,023 lb)
- Powerplant: 1 × Bristol Siddeley Orpheus B.Or.3 turbojet, 21.6 kN (4,850 lbf) thrust

Performance

- Maximum speed: 1,194 km/h (742 mph, 645 kn)

Armament

- Guns: (proposed) four 12.7 mm (0.5 in) Colt-Browning machine-guns

== See also ==
Related development

- Bréguet 1100

Aircraft of comparable role, configuration, and era

- Dassault Étendard IV
- Fiat G.91
- Hawker Hunter
