= Dassault Étendard II =

French fighter-bomber jet prototype of the 1950s

General information
- Type: Prototype fighter aircraft
- Manufacturer: Dassault
- Primary user: French Air Force
- Number built: 1

History
- First flight: 23 July 1956
- Developed into: Dassault Étendard IV

The Dassault Étendard II was a French prototype fighter aircraft initially developed as a follow-on project to the Dassault Mystère series. It was presented to the French Air Force for evaluation but was rejected in favour of the Dassault Mirage III.

Originally designated Mystère XXII, the aircraft was developed in response to a French Air Force requirement for a light, jet-powered fighter-bomber. At around the same time, the NATO NBMR-1 requirement was circulated, also calling for a light strike-fighter, and Dassault developed a very similar aircraft in parallel for that competition (the Étendard VI).

The sole prototype of the Étendard II flew on July 23, 1956 but proved to be somewhat underpowered and showed nothing like the promise of the Mirage series and was quickly abandoned.

A further development of the Étendard concept, the Étendard IV was successfully developed for French Navy service.

== Specifications (Étendard II) ==
Data from The Complete Book of Fighters

General characteristics

- Crew: 1
- Length: 12.89 m (42 ft 3 in)
- Wingspan: 8.74 m (28 ft 8 in)
- Height: 3.8 m (12 ft 6 in)
- Wing area: 24.2 m^{2} (260 sq ft)
- Empty weight: 4,210 kg (9,281 lb)
- Gross weight: 5,650 kg (12,456 lb)
- Powerplant: 2 × Turboméca Gabizo turbojet engines, 18.4 kN (4,100 lbf) thrust each

Performance

- Maximum speed: 1,054 km/h (655 mph, 569 kn) (M0.86) at sea level

1,004 km/h (624 mph; 542 kn) (M0.945) at 11,000 m (36,000 ft)

- Range: 1,100 km (680 mi, 590 nmi)
- Service ceiling: 15,000 m (49,000 ft)
- Time to altitude: 10,000 m (33,000 ft) in 13 minutes
- Wing loading: 233 kg/m^{2} (48 lb/sq ft)
- Thrust/weight: 0.33

Armament

- Guns: 2× 30 mm (1.18 in) cannons
- Bombs: 1,500 kg (3,300 lb) of bombs and rockets

== See also ==
Related development

- Dassault Étendard IV
- Dassault Étendard VI
- Dassault Super Étendard

Aircraft of comparable role, configuration, and era

- Dassault Mirage III
- Dassault Mystère

Related lists

- List of fighter aircraft
- List of military aircraft of France

== Bibliography ==
- Carbonel, Jean-Christophe (2016). French Secret Projects. Vol. 1: Post War Fighters. Manchester, UK: Crecy Publishing. ISBN 978-1-91080-900-6.
