= Dassault Étendard IV =

Fighter aircraft in the French Navy

Étendard IV
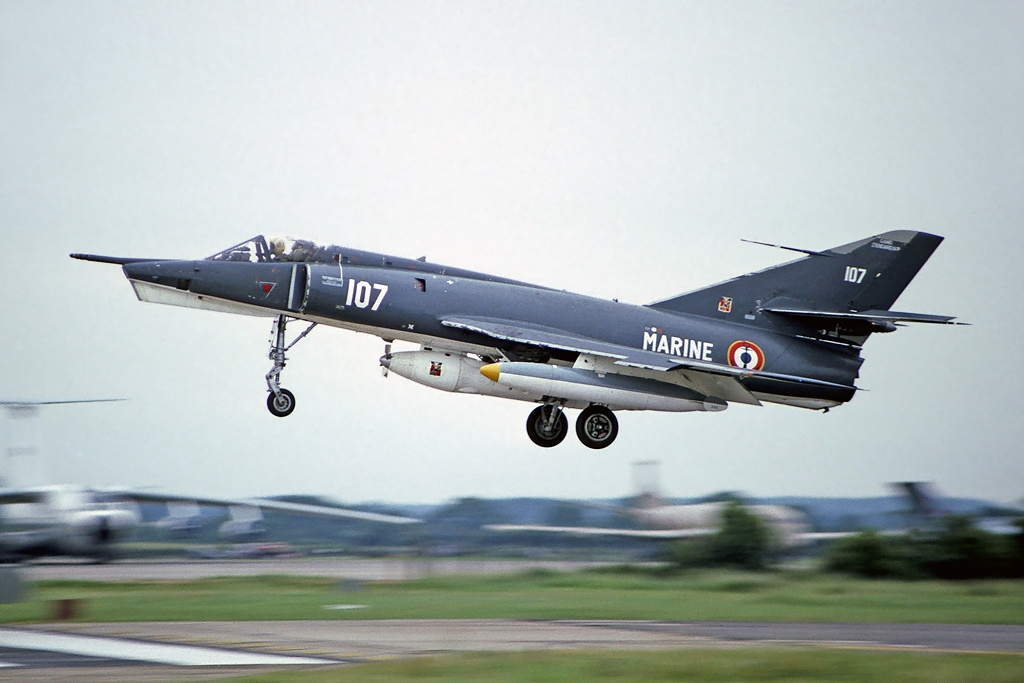

General information
- Type: Strike fighter
- National origin: France
- Manufacturer: Dassault Aviation
- Status: Retired
- Primary user: French Navy
- Number built: 90

History
- Introduction date: 1962
- First flight: 24 July 1956
- Retired: 1991 (IVM); 2000 (IVP)
- Developed from: Dassault Étendard II
- Developed into: Dassault-Breguet Super Étendard

The Dassault Étendard IV is a transonic carrier-borne strike fighter aircraft developed and manufactured by French aerospace company Dassault Aviation.

Development of the Étendard originally commenced during the 1950s. Despite not having attracted the interests of either the French Air Force or any of the NATO air forces, a more powerful proposal had attracted the interest of the French Navy. Accordingly, Dassault developed a navalised demonstrator, which made its first flight on 24 July 1956. Its performance having met with the service's satisfaction, the French Navy ordered the type into production, receiving a total of 69 Étendard IVM fighters, in addition to 21 Étendard IVP, the latter being a specialised aerial reconnaissance variant.

The Étendard would serve as the basis for the more advanced Dassault-Breguet Super Étendard. During the 1970s, it had been intended to replace the Étendard IV with a navalised version of the SEPECAT Jaguar, designated as the Jaguar M. However, development of the Jaguar M was terminated and, shortly after, it was announced that the Super Étendard had been ordered in its place. For a time, the Étendard IV was operated alongside its improved model before being progressively withdrawn during the 1980s. In 1991, the fighter models of the type was finally retired from service by its sole operator, while the reconnaissance variant was withdrawn during 2000.

== Development ==
The Étendard has its origins in the early 1950s, with the experiences of combatants in the Korean War and the lessons derived from it subsequently. Two separate specifications were offered to French manufacturers: one for the French Air Force and the other for the numerous air forces of the multinational NATO alliance. In response, Dassault Aviation drew up a single basic design, with the intention that variants of it would satisfy both specifications. These variants were designated Étendard II and Étendard VI respectively; according to Dassault, these aircraft would have incorporated major advances in terms of high lift devices, which enabled lower take-off and landing speeds to be used. The Étendard II was evidently optimised for speed and payload, while the Étendard VI was a more lightweight variant, aimed at export markets. However, despite the building of a prototype for both variants, there was initially little interest on the part of both the French military and other potential buyers.

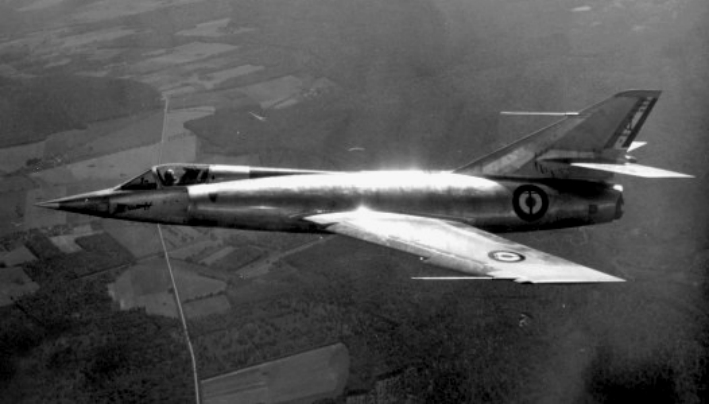
The prototype Étendard IV in flight, 1959.

However, this lack of demand did not curtail Dassault's ambitions. Early on, the company had decided to embark on the development of a larger and more powerful variant, which was originally designated as the Mystère XXIV, as a private venture in parallel to the issued specifications. The French Navy showed open interest in this prospective Mystère XXIV variant. Bolstered by this, Dassault proceeded with the construction of a single navalised prototype, features of which included new navigation and radar systems, folding wings, deck landing hooks, along with the reinforcement of the fuselage. Following a series of ground tests, its maiden flight occurred on 24 July 1956.

Meanwhile, the French Navy sought to acquire the Étendard, once tests had deemed it suitable as a carrier-based ground attack aircraft, along with a secondary, low-altitude interception role. As part of the trials process, a total of five pre-production aircraft were manufactured. Flight testing of the type revealed it to have favourable performance qualities, including a relatively high external load capacity. Having been sufficiently satisfied with this demonstration of the aircraft's capabilities and performance attributes, the French Navy opted to procure a total of 69 Étendard IVM fighters and 21 Étendard IVP aerial reconnaissance aircraft.

The Jaguar M, a navalized variant of the Anglo-French SEPECAT Jaguar, was intended to be the Étendard's replacement, but this effort was derailed by political lobbying on the part of Dassault, who instead favoured their own proposal, which was an advanced version of the Étendard. This model would go on to be ordered by the French Navy, with whom it would enter service as the Super Étendard. Eventually, the more capable Super Étendard would succeed the Étendard in service.

== Design ==
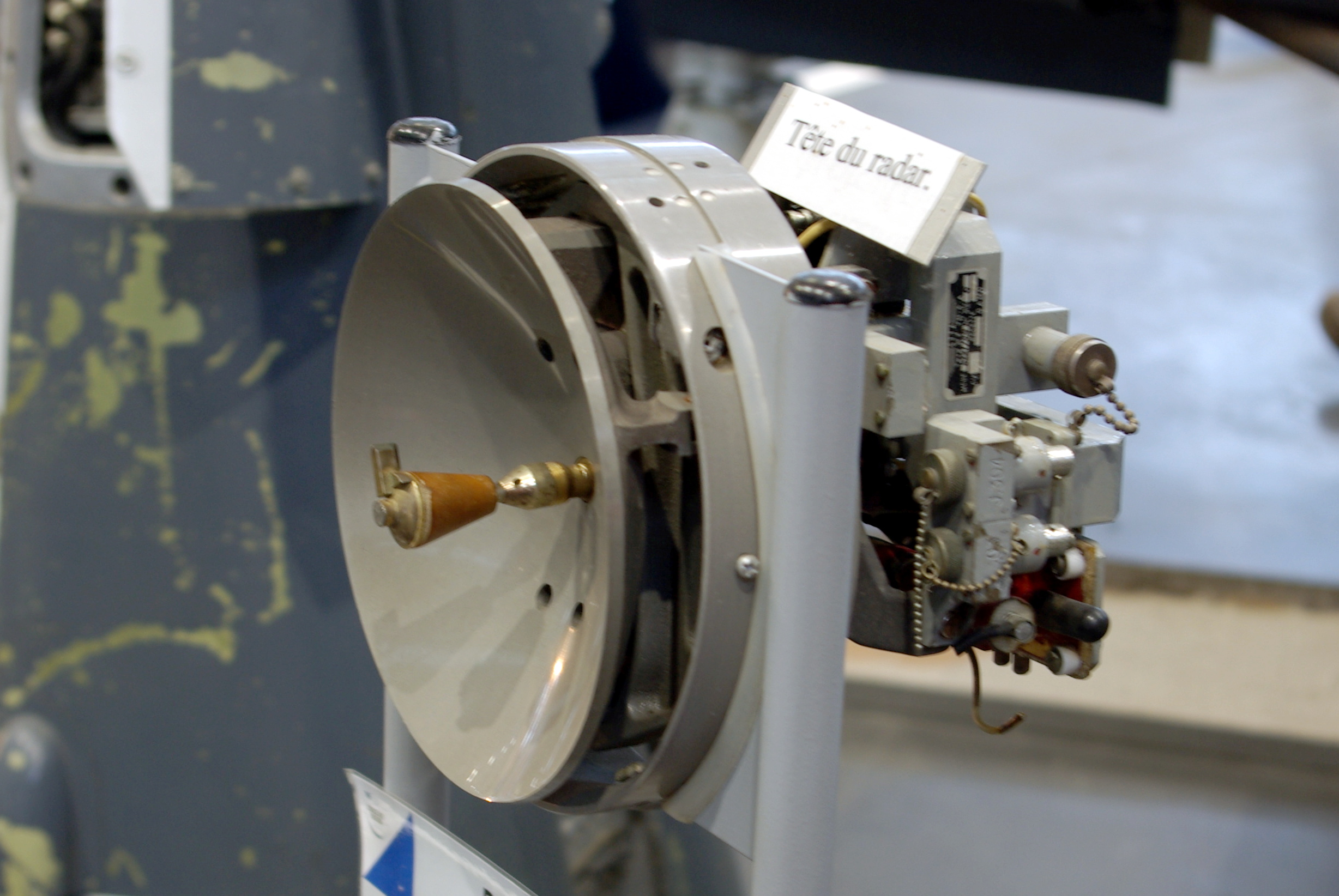
An Aida radar unit on static display

The Étendard was a relatively lightweight navalised attack fighter. In service, it was often noted for its popularity with its pilots due to its high level of manoeuvrability. It featured a highly swept wing, which was furnished with double-slotted flaps and spoilers, as well as powered ailerons and leading-edge droop flaps. To take up less room onboard aircraft carriers when being stored, the wings of the Étendard were designed to be foldable. The type was powered by a single SNECMA Atar turbojet engine, which had also powered the French Air Force's Dassault Mirage III. The engine's configuration was broadly similar to that of the Mirage III's powerplant, albeit with the exception of the removed afterburner. In flight, the Étendard was capable of attaining transonic speeds, being only able to exceed the speed of sound when in a dive.

The Étendard could be furnished with various equipment to carry out its mission roles, which included attack, photo-reconnaissance, and aerial refueling tanking. In addition to the standard dual 30mm DEFA cannon, various armaments and munitions could be carried on the four wing-mounted hardpoints, such as short range air-to-air missiles, air-to-surface missiles, rocket pods, bombs, and drop tanks. A retractable nose-mounted refueling probe was also fitted. Other optional equipment included a tactical air navigation system (TACAN) receiver and a drogue parachute, the latter of which could be used to assist braking during land operations. A compact Dassault-built Aida radar unit was installed within the aircraft's nose, along with a compact infrared sensor, which could be used for guiding various munitions. Alongside the Aida radar unit, a Swedish-made SAAB bombing computer was added to increase accuracy.

The aerial reconnaissance-orientated Étendard IVP was largely similar to the fighter model of the aircraft, but did have some key differences. An arrangement of five OMERA cameras was housed within the aircraft's lengthy nose; furthermore, the ventral bay could also accommodate a number of long-focus cameras in lieu of the cannon armament. While a refuelling probe was also present on reconnaissance aircraft, this was non-retractable due to a lack of available space in the interior of the nose.

== Operational history ==
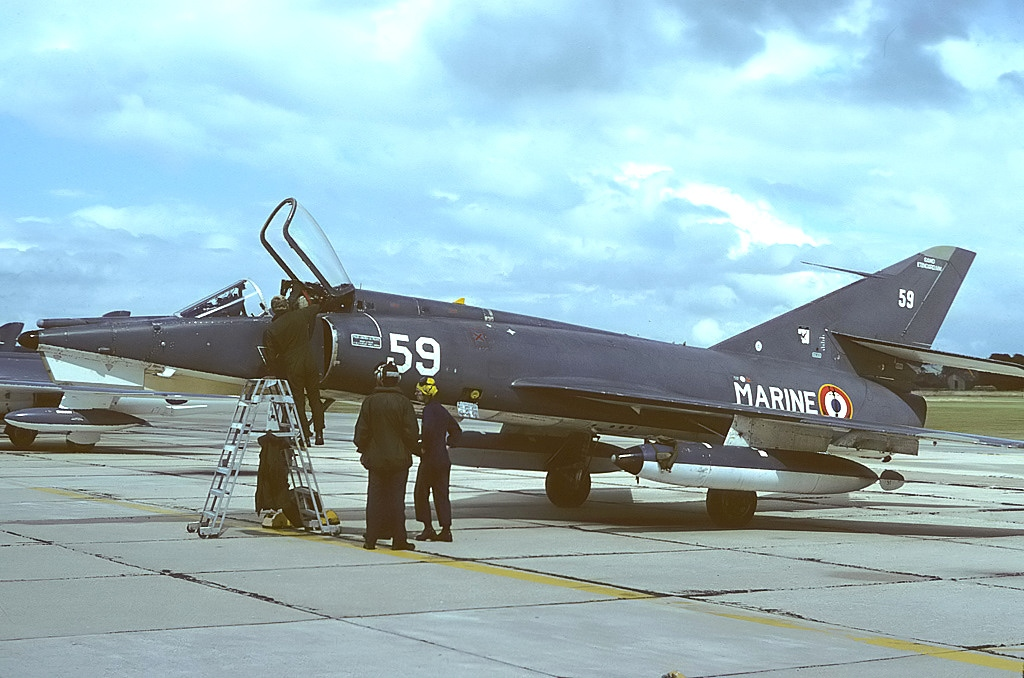
A parked Étendard of Flottille 17F, based at Hyeres, August 1979

On 9 December 1961, the first Étendard was delivered to the French Navy, using a Douglas D-704 refuelling pod. The following year, the type was deployed for the first time aboard both of the service's newly built Clemenceau-class aircraft carriers, the Clemenceau and Foch. Production continued until 1965.

The Étendard IVM was tasked to deliver Nord AS-30 missiles, while the Étendard IVP was used in the Lebanese Civil War from 1983 to 1984. The type was gradually relegated to secondary missions in favour of the Super Étendard; as such, it was phased out from active combat roles in 1987. The last examples of the fighter-orientated model were withdrawn during July 1991, the type's final use having been with the Squadron 11F, 15F, 16F, 17F and 59S ship-borne fighter schools.

The Étendard IVP was also used in the Bosnian War from 1993 to 1995, and the Kosovo War in 1999. The Étendards remained in active service until 27 July 2000.

== Variants ==
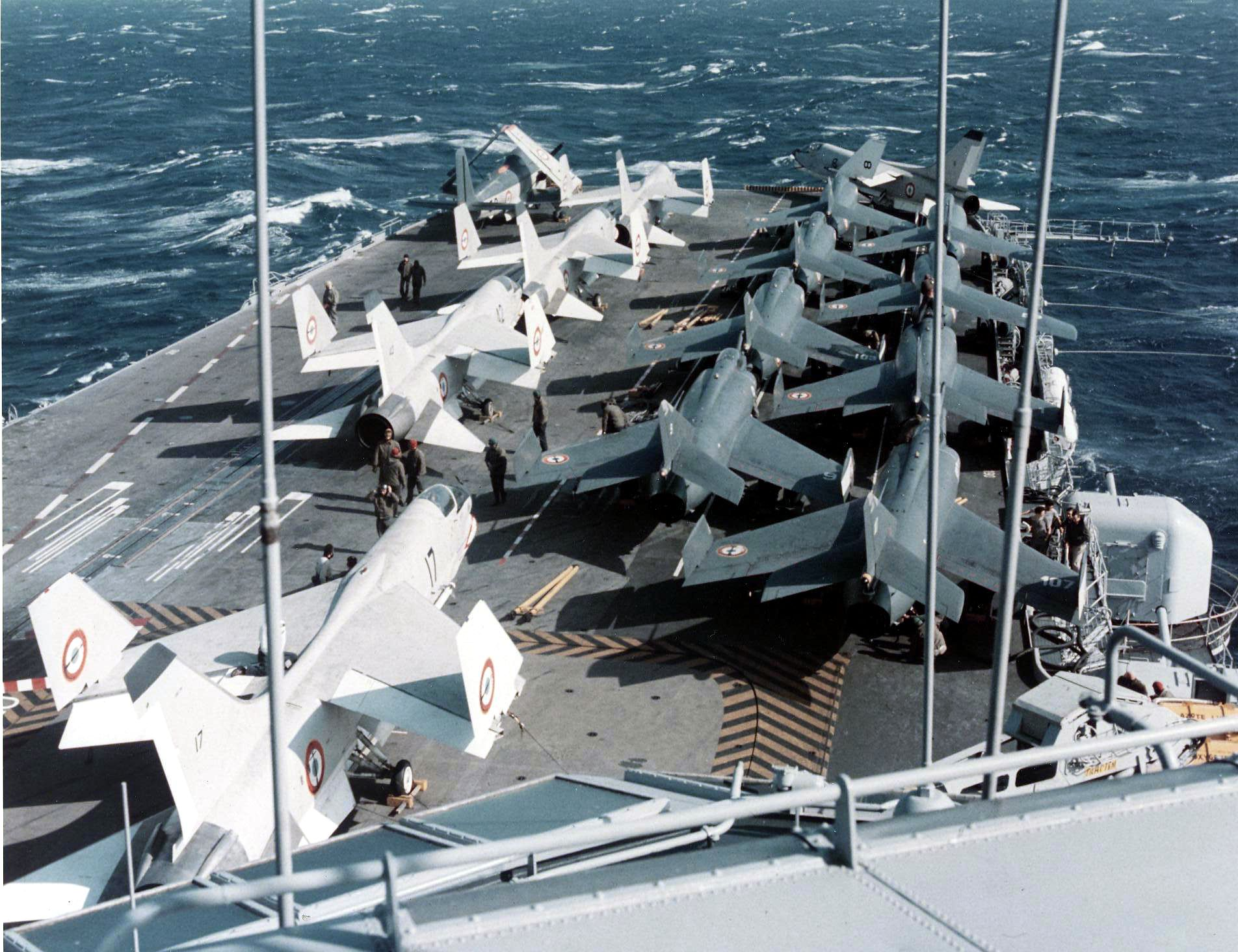
Eight Étendards parked on the flight deck of a French aircraft carrier, alongside five Crusaders and a single Alizé.

Étendard IV
The prototype powered by a 34.34 kN (7,720 lbf) SNECMA ATAR 101E3, first flown on 24 July 1956.
Étendard IVB
One prototype fitted with a 49.82 kN (11,200 lbf) thrust Rolls-Royce Avon engine and blown flaps.
Étendard IVM
Single-seat Maritime strike fighter aircraft for the French Navy.
Étendard IVP
Single-seat Photo reconnaissance aircraft for the French Navy.

== Operators ==
France

- French Navy
  - French Naval Aviation (Aviation navale)
    - Flottille 11F
    - Flottille 15F
    - Flottille 16F
    - Flottille 17F
    - Escadrille 59S

== Specifications (Étendard IVM) ==
Multi-angled depiction of an Etendard IV

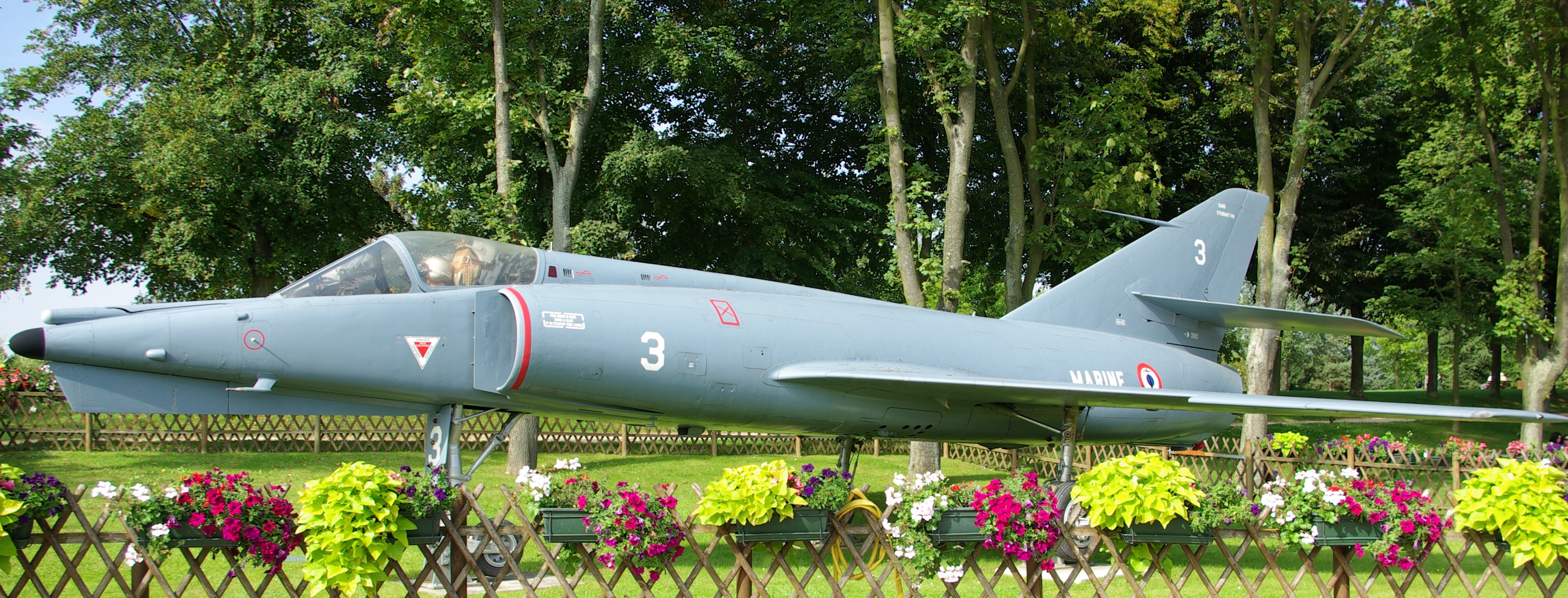
Preserved Étendard IVM exhibited in a park in Paray-Vieille-Poste near Orly Airport

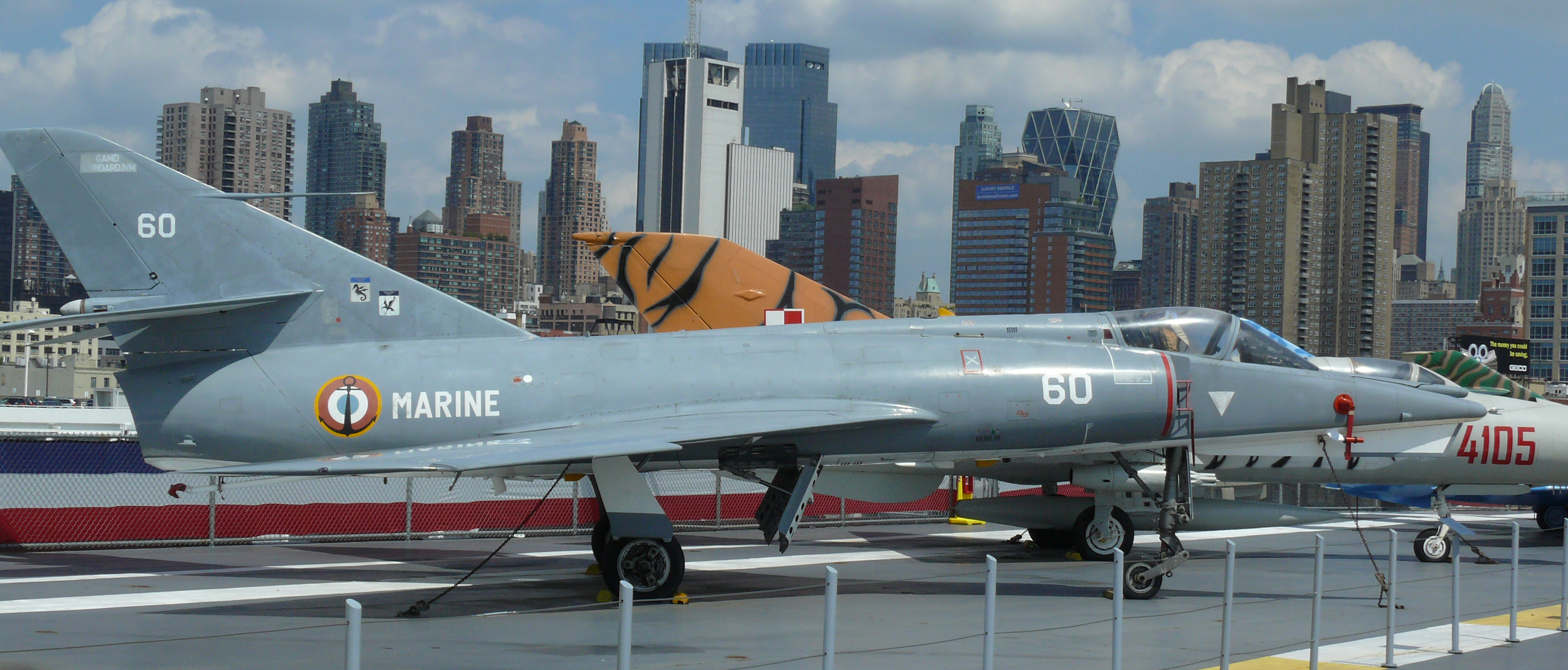
Étendard IVM on display at the en:Intrepid Museum

Data from The Complete Book of Fighters

General characteristics

- Crew: 1
- Length: 14.35 m (47 ft 1 in)
- Wingspan: 9.6 m (31 ft 6 in)
- Height: 3.9 m (12 ft 10 in)
- Wing area: 28.4 m^{2} (306 sq ft)
- Empty weight: 5,897 kg (13,001 lb)
- Gross weight: 8,170 kg (18,012 lb)
- Max takeoff weight: 10,200 kg (22,487 lb)
- Powerplant: 1 × SNECMA ATAR 08B turbojet engine, 43.16 kN (9,700 lbf) thrust

Performance

- Maximum speed: 1,099 km/h (683 mph, 593 kn)
- Range: 3,300 km (2,100 mi, 1,800 nmi)
- Service ceiling: 15,500 m (50,900 ft)
- Rate of climb: 100 m/s (20,000 ft/min)
- Wing loading: 282 kg/m^{2} (58 lb/sq ft)
- Thrust/weight: 0.75 (Empty), 0.54 (Gross), 0.43 (MTOW)

Armament

- Guns: 2 × 30 mm (1.18 in) DEFA 552 cannons with 150 rounds per gun
- Rockets: 2 × Matra rocket pods with 18× SNEB 68 mm rockets each
- Missiles: AIM-9 Sidewinder and Matra Magic air-to-air missiles, Nord AS.30 and AS.20 air-to-surface missiles.
- Bombs: 1,360 kg (3,000 lb) of payload on four external hardpoints, including a variety of bombs or Drop tanks

== See also ==
Related development

- Dassault Étendard II
- Dassault Étendard VI
- Dassault Super Étendard

Aircraft of comparable role, configuration, and era

- Blackburn Buccaneer
- Douglas A-4 Skyhawk
- Supermarine Scimitar
- Vought A-7 Corsair II

Related lists

- List of fighter aircraft
- List of military aircraft of France
