= NBMR-1 =

NATO aircraft design specification

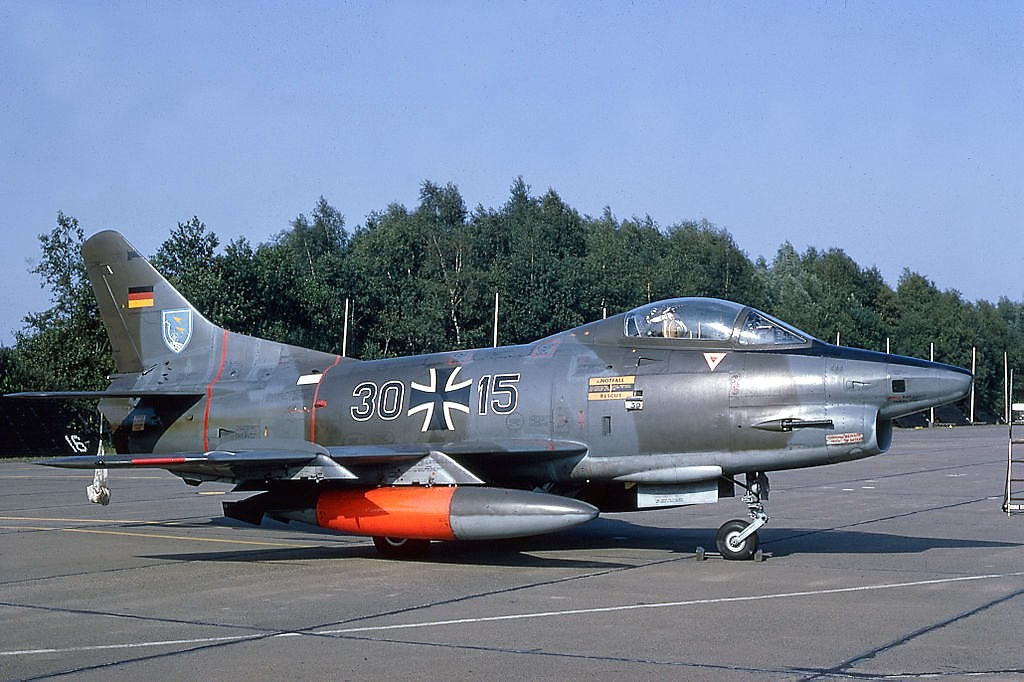
- The winning entry, Fiat G.91 lightweight strike fighter

General information
- Project for: Development of military aircraft
- Issued by: NATO
- Prototypes: Bréguet 1001 Taon; Dassault Mystère XXVI; Fiat G.91

History
- Initiated: 1953
- Concluded: 1958
- Outcome: G.91 officially declared winner
- Successors: NBMR-3

NATO Basic Military Requirement 1 (NBMR-1) was a document produced by a North Atlantic Treaty Organisation (NATO) committee in the 1950s detailing the specification of future combat aircraft designs. The requirement was for a "light weight tactical strike fighter (LWTSF)" capable of carrying both conventional and tactical nuclear weapons from rough airfields and having simple maintenance requirements.

== Specification ==
In December 1953, NATO Supreme Command, realizing that a few, expensive and complex fighters located on few airbases were very vulnerable in case of a nuclear war, issued a specification for a new light tactical support aircraft. Aircraft manufacturers within NATO countries were invited to submit their designs for a Light Weight Strike Fighter. The competition was intended to produce a combat aircraft that was light, small and equipped with basic weapons and avionics. It should also be able to operate from dispersed airfields and require minimal ground support.

The technical requirements were:

- 1,100 m (3,600 ft) takeoff distance over a 15 m (49 ft) obstacle
- Capability to operate from grass strips and roads
- Maximum speed of Mach 0.95
- Range of 280 km (170 mi) with 10 minutes over the target
- Armoured protection for the pilot and the fuel tanks
- 4 × 12.7 mm (0.50 in) or 2 × 20mm or 30mm guns
- A maximum of 2,200 kilograms (4,900 lb) empty weight and 4,700 kilograms (10,400 lb) max weight

The challenge of providing an engine that matched the requirements of lightness and power, reliability and ease of maintenance was solved by using the Bristol Siddeley Orpheus turbojet. The development of the Orpheus was funded from the US Mutual Weapons Development Program which was a way for the US to support weapons procurement for members of the NATO alliance.

== Submissions and selections ==
Designs were submitted by manufacturers from many NATO countries, including France, Italy and the United States. Designs were required within two months of the competition and submitted to AGARD under the leadership of Theodore von Kármán. The committee assessed eight projects, including the Aerfer Sagittario 2 (Italy), Breguet Br.1001 Taon (France), Dassault Mystère XXVI (France), Fiat G.91 (Italy), Northrop N-156 (USA) and Sud-Est Baroudeur (France). Although its development is considered a factor which motivated NATO to issue the requirement, the Folland Gnat itself was not evaluated in the competition.

Project selections started on 18 March 1953 and took 18 months to complete, the first result being announced on 30 June 1955. The winning projects were, in order: the Breguet Br. 1001 Taon, the Fiat G.91 and the Mystère XXVI. Prototypes of each design were ordered. The first G.91 flew on 9 August 1956 at the Caselle airfield, Turin, in the hands of Chief Test Pilot Riccardo Bignamini. Gérard Muselli flew the first Mystère XXVI, now named Étendard VI, on 15 March 1956 at Melun Villaroche Aerodrome. The Breguet Taon followed on 26 July 1957.

The three rivals were sent for evaluation trials at the Centre d'Essais en Vol at Brétigny-sur-Orge in France in September 1957. The Italian aircraft performed most impressively and in consequence, in January 1958, the Fiat G.91 was officially declared the competition winner.

== Outcome ==
A meeting of NATO Defence Ministers was held in April 1958 at which it was agreed that the G.91 would be the first NATO lightweight strike fighter, with the Breguet Taon following in 1961. A production meeting was planned for May 1958 to discuss the production of the aircraft with financial support from the United States. The Americans agreed to provide some of the finance for the French, German and Italian aircraft and pay for the planned Turkish aircraft.

Given the large economic and commercial interests at stake, there was a certain amount of controversy surrounding the decision. After the loss of the G.91 prototype due to aeroelastic vibration on 20 February 1957, the French government decided to pursue development of the locally designed Dassault Étendard VI. The British government similarly ignored the competition to concentrate on Hawker Hunter production. In contrast, the Italian government preemptively ordered the G.91 for the Italian Air Force before the results of the competition were known.

In the end, the German Air Force (Luftwaffe) placed the largest order based on the competition. The Luftwaffe was originally to have received fifty G.91R and twenty G.91T two-seaters from the Fiat production lines and a further 232 G.91R manufactured under licence in Germany by the Dornier, Messerschmitt and Heinkel companies (Arbeitsgemeinschaft G.91.) The licence production was subsequently increased to 294 aircraft, bringing the total to 344. The G.91R/3 equipped four newly formed Leichte Kampfgeschwader ("light attack wings"), often replacing former Republic F-84F Thunderstreak units.

The G.91 was to be replaced in the 1960s by the winner of the NBMR-3 competition for VSTOL aircraft, but that did not result in a common aircraft design. In the end, the last G.91s were retired by Germany in 1982 and Italy in 1995 respectively, while the final Dassault-Breguet Super Étendard, the ultimate derivative of the unsuccessful Étendard VI, served with French Naval Aviation (Aéronavale) until 2016.

== See also ==
- Light fighter
- Lightweight Fighter program
