= Dassault Étendard VI =

French prototype jet fighter

General information
- Type: Prototype fighter aircraft
- Manufacturer: Dassault Aviation
- Status: Did not enter mass-production
- Primary user: French Air Force
- Number built: 2

History
- First flight: 15 March 1957
- Developed into: Dassault Étendard IV

The Dassault Étendard VI was a French prototype fighter aircraft initially developed as part of the NATO NBMR-1 competition to find a standard fighter to serve amongst member air forces. Dassault took advantage of the fact that the French Air Force had issued a requirement around the same time for a new fighter-bomber and developed aircraft in parallel as variations of the same design concept for the two prospective customers.

Originally designated Mystère XXVI, the aircraft was accepted as one of the entrants to be developed to prototype stage for a fly-off with competing designs. It fared well in test flights, but was out-performed by the Aeritalia G.91 that was eventually selected as the winner of the competition.

A further development of the Étendard concept, the Étendard IV was successfully developed for French Navy service.

== Specifications ==
Data from

General characteristics

- Crew: 1
- Length: 10.85 m (35 ft 7 in)
- Wingspan: 8.3 m (27 ft 3 in)
- Height: 3.76 m (12 ft 4 in)
- Wing area: 23 m^{2} (250 sq ft)
- Empty weight: 3,720 kg (8,201 lb)
- Max takeoff weight: 5,860 kg (12,919 lb)
- Powerplant: 1 × Bristol Siddeley Orpheus turbojet, 21.6 kN (4,900 lbf) thrust

Performance

- Maximum speed: 912 km/h (567 mph, 492 kn)
- Range: 890 km (550 mi, 480 nmi)
- Service ceiling: 13,400 m (44,000 ft)
- Wing loading: 255 kg/m^{2} (52 lb/sq ft)
- Thrust/weight: 0.38

Armament

- Guns: ** 2× 30 mm (1.18 in) cannons or
  - 4× 12.7 mm (0.50 in) machine guns
- Bombs: 1,000 kg (2,200 lb) of bombs and rockets

== See also ==
Related development

- Dassault Étendard II
- Dassault Étendard IV
- Dassault-Breguet Super Étendard

Aircraft of comparable role, configuration, and era

- Aeritalia G.91
- Breguet Taon
- F-5 Freedom Fighter

Related lists

- List of fighter aircraft
- List of military aircraft of France

== Bibliography ==
- Carbonel, Jean-Christophe (2016). French Secret Projects. Vol. 1: Post War Fighters. Manchester, UK: Crecy Publishing. ISBN 978-1-91080-900-6.
