= Operation Black Buck =

Series of British long-range airstrikes during the Falklands War

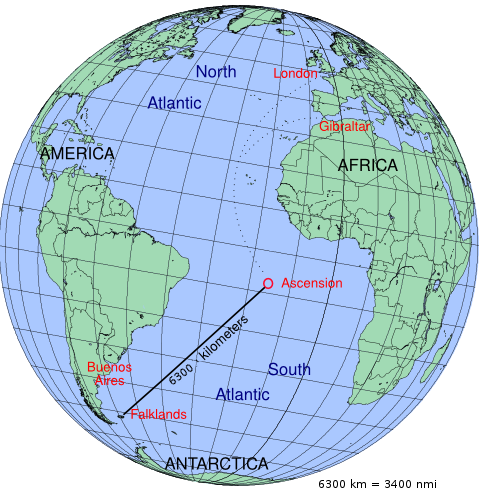
Operation Black Buck on the map.

Operations Black Buck 1 to Black Buck 7 were seven extremely long-range airstrikes conducted during the 1982 Falklands War by Royal Air Force (RAF) Vulcan bombers of the RAF Waddington Wing, comprising aircraft from Nos. 44, 50 and 101 Squadrons, against Argentine positions in the Falkland Islands. Five of the missions completed attacks. The objective of the missions was to attack Port Stanley Airport and its associated defences. The raids, at almost 6,600 nautical miles (7,600 mi; 12,200 km) and 16 hours for the round trip, were the longest-ranged bombing raids in history at that time.

The Operation Black Buck raids were staged from RAF Ascension Island, close to the Equator. The Vulcan was designed for medium-range missions in Europe and lacked the range to fly to the Falklands without refuelling several times. The RAF's tanker planes were mostly converted Handley Page Victor bombers with similar range, so they too had to be refuelled in the air. A total of eleven tankers were required for two Vulcans (one primary and one reserve), a daunting logistical effort as all aircraft had to use the same runway.

The Vulcans carried either twenty-one 1,000-pound (450 kg) bombs internally or two or four Shrike anti-radar missiles externally. Of the five Black Buck raids flown to completion, three were against Stanley Airfield's runway and operational facilities, while the other two were anti-radar missions using Shrike missiles against a Westinghouse AN/TPS-43 long-range 3D radar in the Port Stanley area. Shrikes hit two of the less valuable and rapidly replaced secondary fire control radars, causing some casualties among the Argentine crews. One Vulcan was almost lost when a breakdown of its refueling system forced it to land in Brazil.

The raids did minimal damage to the runway and damage to radars was quickly repaired. A single crater was produced on the runway, rendering it impossible for the airfield to be used by fast jets. Argentine ground crew repaired the runway within twenty-four hours, to a level of quality suitable for C-130 Hercules transports. The British were aware that the runway remained in use. It has been suggested that the Black Buck raids were undertaken by the RAF because the British armed forces had been cut in the late 1970s and the RAF may have desired a greater role in the conflict to prevent further cuts.

== Background ==
During the early 1980s, British defence planning was focused on the Cold War confrontation with the Soviet Union. Nonetheless, at six-monthly intervals the Defence chiefs reviewed other possible areas of conflict around the globe, including the Falkland Islands. The consensus was that they were indefensible. The nearest airfield usable for operations was on Ascension Island, a British territory in the South Atlantic not far from the equator with a single 10,000-foot (3,000 m) runway at Wideawake airfield that lay 3,700 nautical miles (4,300 mi; 6,900 km) from the UK and 3,300 nautical miles (3,800 mi; 6,100 km) from the Falklands. Without aircraft able to cover the long distance, the Royal Air Force (RAF) could not envisage carrying out operations in the South Atlantic. Activities in the South Atlantic would be carried out by the Royal Navy and the British Army, with the RAF's role restricted to the Hawker Siddeley Nimrod maritime patrol aircraft and logistic support of the base at Ascension by Vickers VC10 and Lockheed C-130 Hercules transport aircraft.

Argentine codes had been broken, and in March 1982 intelligence warnings about possible Argentine activity in the South Atlantic accumulated. The RAF began examining whether it was possible to carry out long-range operations with Avro Vulcan bombers using aerial refuelling. In 1961, a Vulcan had flown non-stop from the UK to RAAF Base Richmond near Sydney in Australia, a much greater distance, but that was with pre-positioned aerial tankers along the route, which would not be possible flying from Ascension. All consideration at this point was about how it could be done; no targets were identified in the Falklands or Argentina.

After Argentina invaded the Falkland Islands on 2 April 1982, the British Government resolved to recapture them.

=== Victor tankers ===
Long-range operations were entirely dependent upon the RAF's fleet of Handley Page Victor K2 tankers. Originally 34 Victors had been built as bombers; 24 had subsequently been converted to tankers. One had been lost in an accident at RAF Marham on 28 September 1976, leaving the RAF with a force of just 23. These were the only tankers in British service in April 1982; nine VC10s were in the process of being converted to tankers, but conversion of the first was not completed until 22 June. Of these, twelve were assigned to No. 55 Squadron and eleven to No. 57 Squadron.

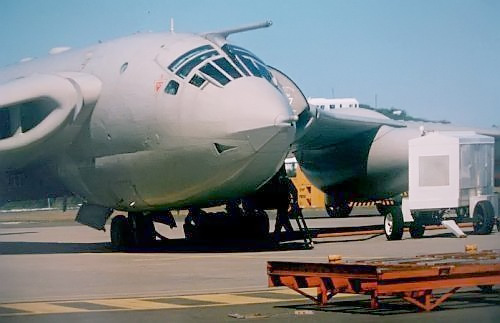
Victor XM717 (in Bermuda in 1984)

The tanker crews were well-trained for their wartime role, as their peacetime role involved refuelling fighters scrambled in response to incursions into British airspace, usually by bombers from the Soviet Union at a rate of five per week. However, long-range flights over the unfamiliar South Atlantic Ocean necessitated upgrades to the Victors' navigational equipment, notably the installation of the Delco Carousel inertial navigation system and the Omega navigation system. The tankers were themselves capable of being refuelled in flight, which meant that it was possible to set up relays of aircraft.

The first five Victors deployed to Ascension on 18 April, followed by four more the following day. Another six deployed by the end of the month, bringing the Victor tanker force to fourteen, since one had returned to Marham on 26 April. Each was refuelled by another Victor before leaving UK airspace. While the Victors deployed to Ascension, their normal refuelling mission in the air was undertaken by United States Air Force Boeing KC-135 Stratotankers. The station commander at Marham, Group Captain J. S. B. Price, became the senior RAF officer at Ascension. Wing Commander D. W. Maurice-Jones assumed command of the Victor detachment at Ascension until 22 April, when he was relieved by Wing Commander A. W. Bowman, the commander of No. 57 Squadron.

Initial long-range operations by the RAF involved the use of Victor aircraft for reconnaissance of the region surrounding South Georgia Island in support of Operation Paraquet, the recapture of South Georgia. At 0400Z on 20 April, a Victor piloted by Squadron Leader J. G. Elliott, took off from Ascension, accompanied by four supporting tankers to supply fuel for the outbound journey. Another flight of four tankers supplied fuel for the return journey. Two more reconnaissance missions to the South Georgia area were carried out on 22–23 April and on 24–25 April. These missions demonstrated the capability of the Victor tanker fleet, flying out of Ascension, to support operations in the South Atlantic.

=== Vulcan bombers ===
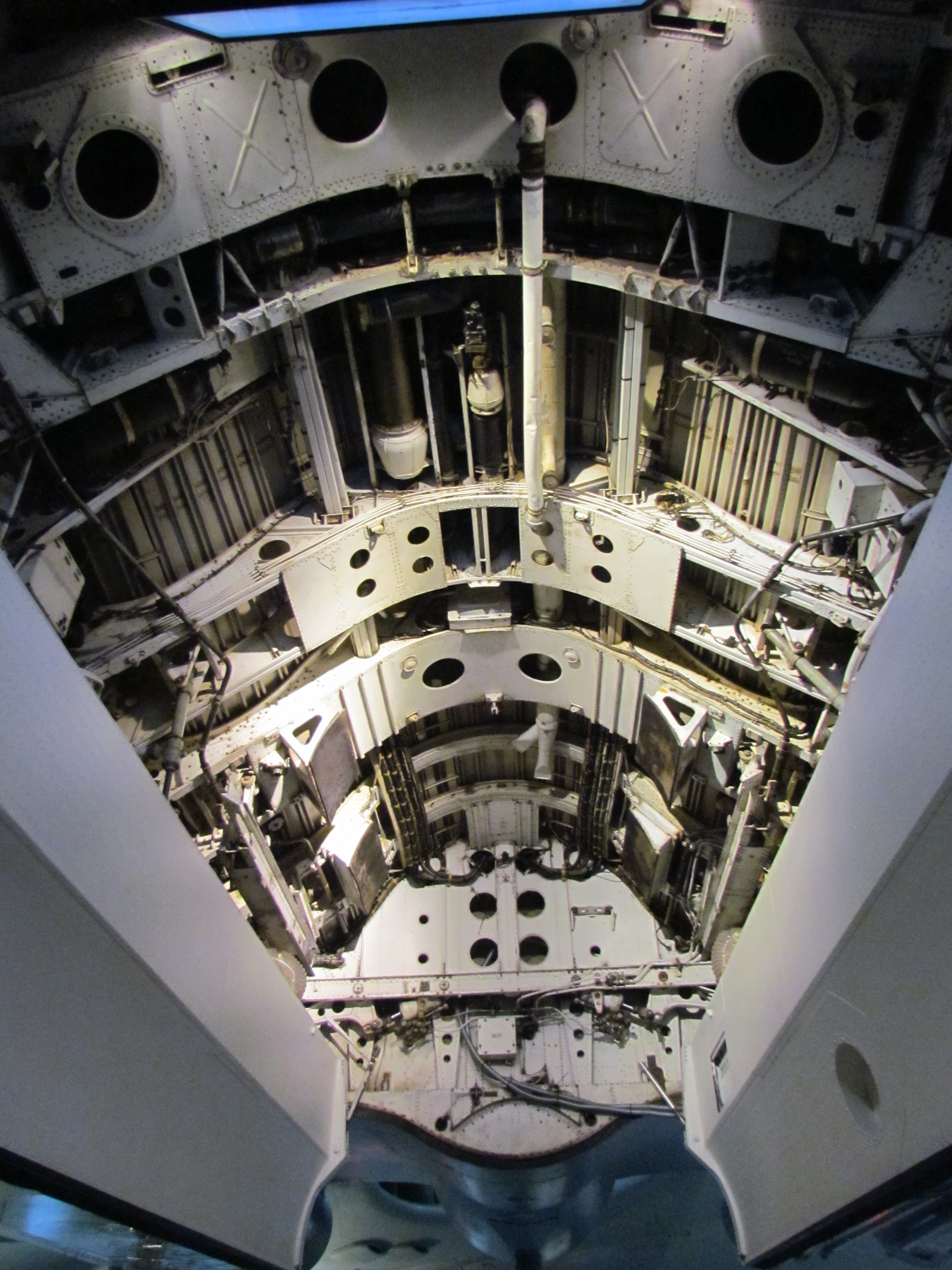
The bomb bay of Vulcan XM598

The Vulcan was the last of the British V bombers in operational use for bombing, but by March 1982 there were only three squadrons remaining, Nos. 44, 50 and 101 Squadrons RAF. All three were scheduled to be disbanded by 1 July 1982. They were based at RAF Waddington in the UK and assigned to North Atlantic Treaty Organization (NATO) for nuclear operations; neither aerial refuelling nor conventional bombing had been practised for several years. A request from Rear Admiral Sandy Woodward, the commander of the British aircraft carrier group heading south, on 11 April for recommendations for targets to attack in the Falkland Islands led to reconsideration of the possibility of attacks using Vulcans. Options for attacks on airfields and ports on the Argentine mainland were discarded as politically provocative and unlikely to produce worthwhile results. The Chief of the Air Staff, Air Chief Marshal Sir Michael Beetham argued that the Vulcan threat would cause the Argentines to retain fighters in the north of Argentina.

Thinking coalesced on a raid on Port Stanley Airport. Whether it would be worth the effort was debated. Beetham initially proposed an attack in which a single Vulcan would drop seven 1,000-pound (450 kg) bombs. This light bomb load would keep the refuelling requirements down to a minimum. However, tests conducted at the Garvie Island bombing range indicated that seven bombs would not be enough, but a full load of twenty-one would have a 90 per cent probability of putting one crater in the runway, with a 75 per cent chance of two craters. An attack was also expected to do damage to the dispersal areas and aircraft parked nearby. To minimise the danger from anti-aircraft guns and surface-to-air missiles, the raids would be carried out at night, preferably in bad weather. Damage to the surrounding area, possibly including parked aircraft, would make the raid worthwhile. While the Chiefs of Staff Committee were convinced that the operation was feasible and stood a good chance of success, the civilians at the Ministry of Defence were not so certain, and there were political implications to using the base at Ascension for offensive purposes, as Wideawake was technically a USAF base. The United States Department of State was consulted, and affirmed that it had no objection. Authority to proceed with the operation, codenamed Black Buck, was given by the War Cabinet on 27 April.

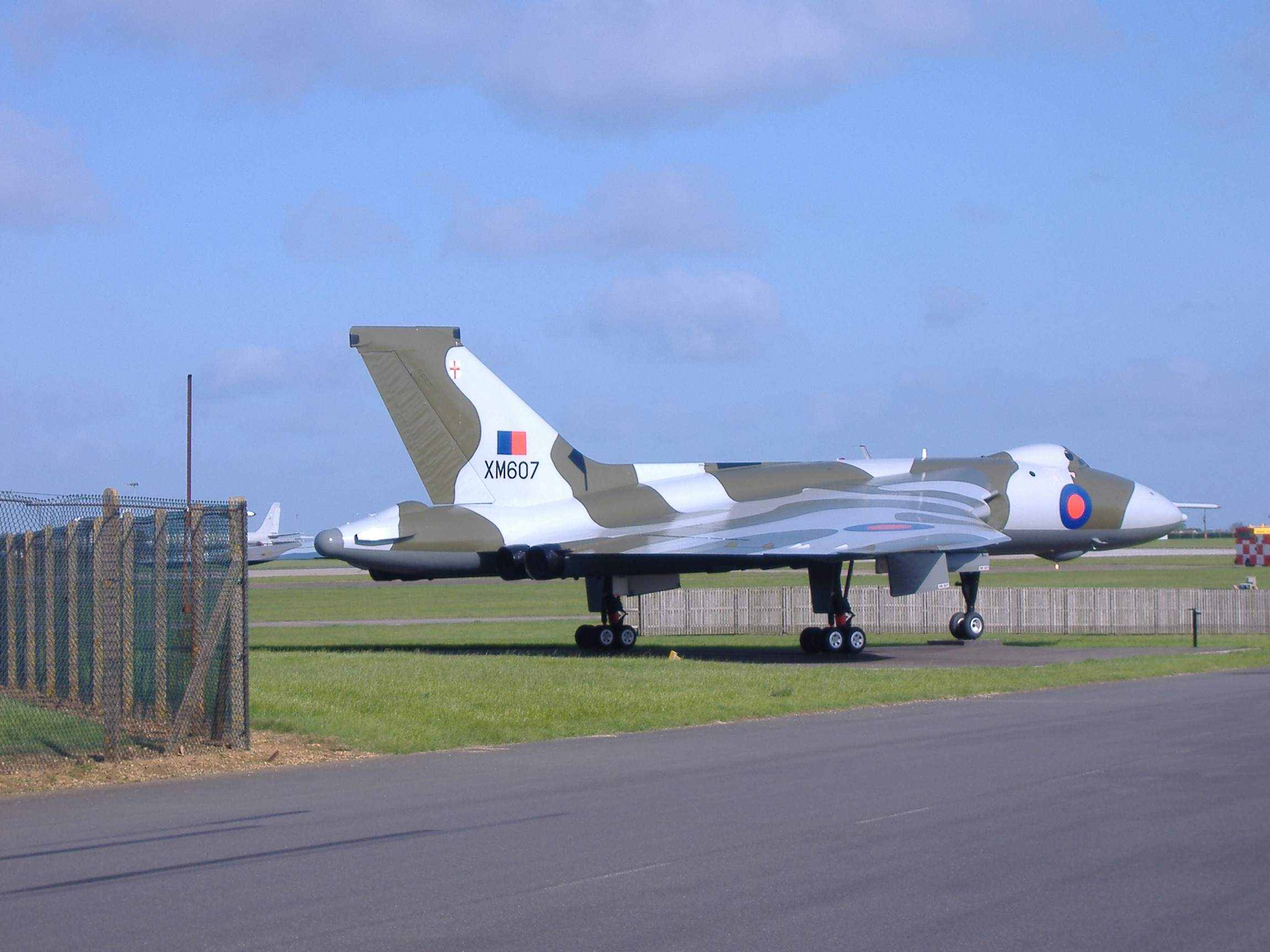
Vulcan XM607, which carried out the first Black Buck raid

The most controversial part of the plan was the involvement of Sea Harriers from Woodward's task force. One of the reasons for the use of the Vulcans was to conserve Sea Harrier resources for the air defence of the naval forces, but the plan required them to conduct a daylight photo reconnaissance sortie over the airfield for the purpose of damage assessment. If they had to be risked, then there were political advantages in using them to carry out the attack on the airport instead. Rear Admiral Derek Reffell proposed that Harriers be used to suppress the airfield radars prior to the Vulcan attack in addition to conducting the post-attack photo reconnaissance. On 29 April, Woodward was informed that the Black Buck raid would occur at 0700Z, and that he was to arrange for the photo reconnaissance to take place as soon as possible afterwards. Woodward signalled that if the photo reconnaissance was essential to Black Buck, then his recommendation was that Black Buck should be cancelled. The following day he was informed that Black Buck had been approved, and that the photo reconnaissance was required not just for damage assessment, but to refute Argentine allegations of indiscriminate bombing.

Vulcans were selected based upon their engines; only those with the more powerful Bristol Olympus 301 engines were considered suitable. Six aircraft were selected: two each from Nos. 44, 50 and 101 Squadrons. In the event, one was not used. Five crews were chosen, one each from Nos. 44 and 101 Squadrons, two from No. 50 Squadron, and one from the recently disbanded No. 9 Squadron. An air-to-air instructor from the operational conversion unit responsible for training personnel to operate Victor tankers was added to each Vulcan crew during operational missions; this officer was responsible for supervising the refuelling contacts.

One of the most challenging tasks was reinstating the aerial refuelling system, which had been blocked off. This involved replacing the 4-inch (100 mm) non-return valves. Twenty replacements were located on a shelf at RAF Stafford. The five aircraft were fitted with the Carousel inertial navigation system. AN/ALQ-101 electronic countermeasure pods from Blackburn Buccaneer aircraft at RAF Honington were fitted to the wings of the Vulcans on improvised pylons, using the attachment points originally intended for the Skybolt missile. The undersides of the aircraft were painted Dark Sea Grey.

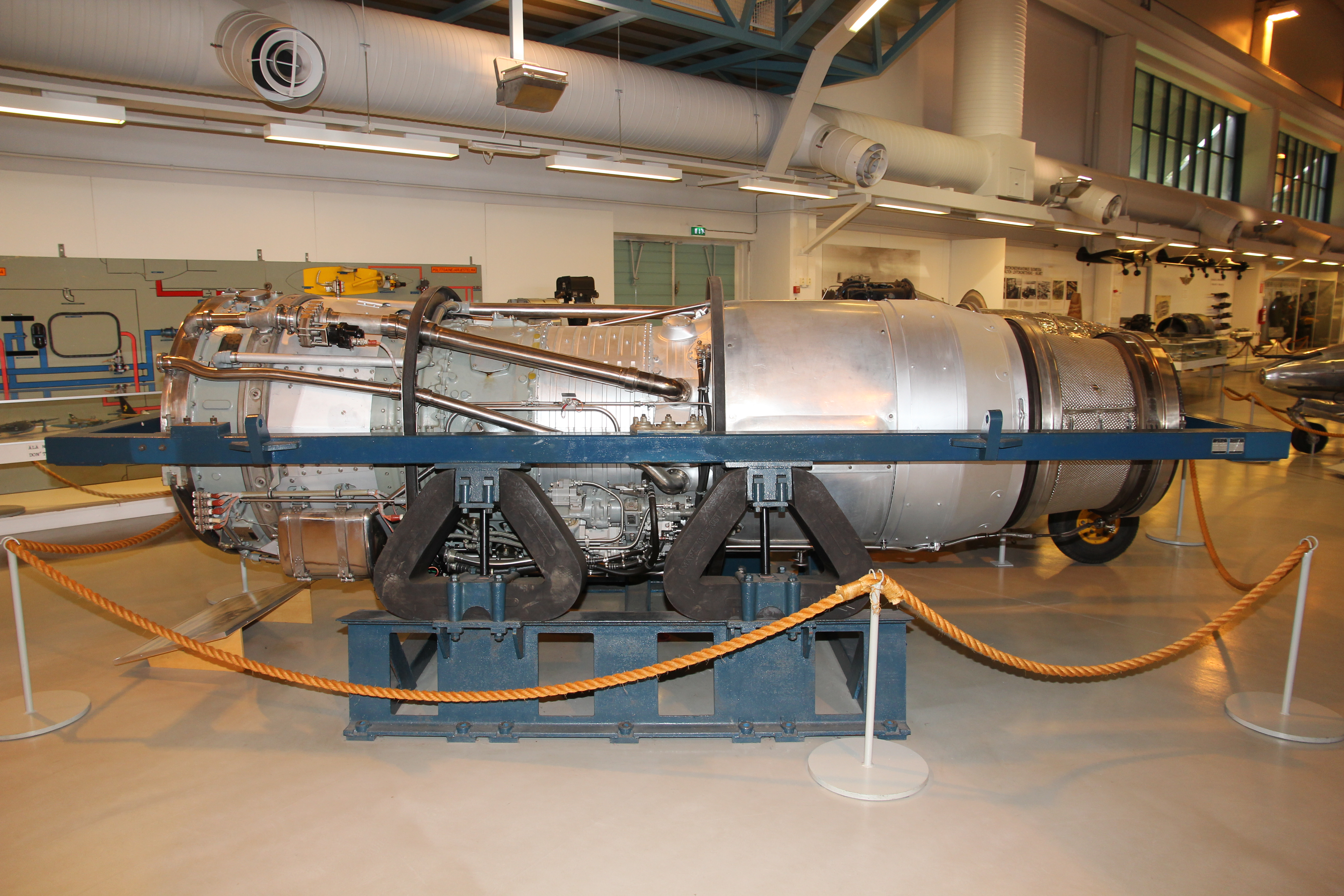
Bristol Olympus 301 jet engine serial number 650179 in the Aviation Museum of Central Finland. This was the number four (right outermost) engine of Vulcan XM612

While the Vulcans were capable of carrying conventional munitions, this had not been done for a long time. To carry twenty-one bombs, the Vulcan required three sets of bomb carriers, each of which held seven bombs. Their release was controlled by a panel at the navigator's station, known as a 90-way, that monitored the electrical connections to each bomb, and was said to provide 90 different sequences for releasing the 1,000-pound bombs. None of the Vulcans at Waddington were fitted with the bomb racks or the 90-way. A search of the supply dumps at Waddington and RAF Scampton located the 90-way panels, which were fitted and tested, but finding enough septuple bomb carriers proved harder, and at least nine were required. Someone remembered that some had been sold to a scrapyard in Newark-on-Trent, and they were retrieved from there. Locating sufficient bombs also proved difficult, and only 167 could be located. Some had cast bomb cases rather than machined ones, which was problematic as they tended to shatter, and this mission required bombs that would penetrate into the ground. Training of crews in conventional bombing and in-flight refuelling was carried out from 14 to 17 April, when Military Air Traffic Controllers from the Military Area Service (M.A.S.) suite at London Terminal Control Centre in West Drayton, Middlesex, took the Vulcan bombers and Victor tankers 250 miles off Land's End in the Atlantic Ocean, where the vast majority of their aerial refuelling training was completed, always at night.

The first two Vulcans, commanded by Squadron Leader John Reeve, and Flight Lieutenant Martin Withers, left Waddington at 0900Z on 29 April and arrived at Wideawake at 1800Z after a non-stop nine-hour flight during which they were twice refuelled by Victor tankers. Two other Vulcans subsequently deployed to Wideawake: one commanded by Squadron Leader Alastair Montgomery arrived on 14 May, and another, commanded by Squadron Leader Neil McDougall, on 27 May. It carried out trials with the Martel anti-radar missile before being equipped with the Shrike missile.

== Missions ==
=== Summary ===
Mission	Target	Date	Primary Vulcan	Reserve Vulcan	Notes	References
Black Buck 1	Port Stanley Airport runway	30 April–1 May	XM598 (Reeve)	XM607 (Withers)	Performed; primary aircraft cabin failed to pressurise shortly after takeoff, replaced by reserve	
Black Buck 2	Port Stanley Airport runway	3–4 May	XM607 (Reeve)	XM598 (Montgomery)	Performed	
Black Buck 3	Port Stanley Airport runway	13 May	XM607	XM612	Cancelled before takeoff due to weather conditions	
Black Buck 4	Anti-aircraft radar	28 May	XM597 (McDougall)	XM598 (Montgomery)	Cancelled 5 hours into flight, due to a fault in the Victor fleet	
Black Buck 5	Anti-aircraft radar	31 May	XM597 (McDougall)	XM598 (Montgomery)	Performed	
Black Buck 6	Anti-aircraft radar	3 June	XM597 (McDougall)	XM598 (Montgomery)	Performed; primary aircraft forced to divert to Brazil due to a broken refuelling probe	
Black Buck 7	Port Stanley Airport stores and aircraft	12 June	XM607 (Withers)	XM598 (Montgomery)	Performed	

=== Black Buck One ===
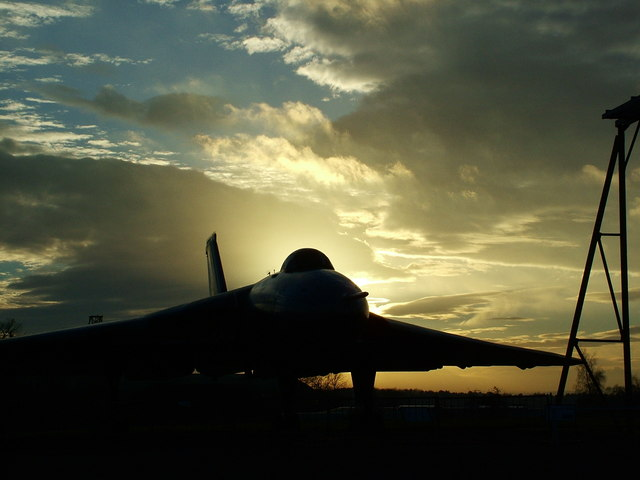
XM598 at Royal Air Force Museum Midlands

The first surprise attack on the islands, on 30 April – 1 May, was the first significant offensive action made by British forces against the Argentine forces in the Falklands. It was aimed at the main runway at Port Stanley Airport. Carrying twenty-one 1,000-pound bombs, the bomber was to fly across the line of the runway at about 35 degrees. The bomb release system was timed to drop bombs sequentially from 10,000 feet (3,000 m), so that at least one bomb would hit the runway. The Vulcan's fuel tanks could contain 9,200 imperial gallons (42,000 L) weighing 74,000 pounds (34,000 kg) in fourteen pressurised bag tanks, five in each wing and four in the fuselage. Based upon estimates of the Vulcan's fuel need, eleven Victor tankers, including two reserve aircraft, were assigned to refuel the single Vulcan before and after its attack on the Falklands. Two Vulcans were assigned to the mission: one, commanded by Reeve, was the lead with another, captained by Withers, as the reserve, which would return to Ascension once Reeve had successfully completed the first aerial refuelling. The plan called for 15 Victor sorties and 18 aerial refuellings. At the time it was the longest bombing mission ever attempted. (B-2 Spirit bombers would surpass that record during the 2001 Operation Enduring Freedom.)

The eleven Victors and two Vulcans began taking off from Wideawake at 2350Z at one-minute intervals, with Reeve's Vulcan the eleventh to lift off and Withers's the last. With a full load of bombs and fuel, a sixth crew member and a fresh coat of paint, the Vulcans were well over their rated maximum takeoff weight of 204,000 pounds (93,000 kg). On the warm Ascension Island, the Bristol Olympus 301 engines had to be run at 103 per cent of their rated power in order to get the Vulcans airborne. Shortly after takeoff, Reeve suffered a failure. A rubber seal on the captain's "direct vision" side window had perished. Unable to close or seal the window and pressurise the crew cabin, he was forced to return to Ascension. The Vulcan lacked the ability to dump fuel, and it was far too heavy even for an emergency landing, so the crew were forced to remain airborne in a cold and noisy cabin until sufficient fuel had been consumed. Withers took over as the primary Vulcan. Twenty minutes later, one of the Victor tankers returned to Ascension with a faulty refuelling hose system, and its place was taken by the reserve.

The attacking Vulcan was refuelled seven times on the outward journey and once on the return journey. Grey lines indicate reserve aircraft to replace casualties.

In the 34 minutes between the first and second refuellings, Withers's Vulcan burned through 9,200 pounds (4,200 kg) of fuel, at the rate of 16,250 pounds (7,370 kg) per hour. All this time its weight never dropped below the theoretical maximum. At the end of the second refuelling, two more tankers peeled off and returned, reducing the force to just three: Withers's Vulcan, a Victor flown by Squadron Leader Bob Tuxford, and a Victor flown by Flight Lieutenant Steve Biglands. As a result of the fuel demand and problems in flight with refuelling, two of the Victors had to fly further south than planned, reducing their own reserves. At the final refuelling bracket, the sortie flew into a violent thunderstorm, during which Biglands's refuelling probe failed.

Tuxford was supposed to return after this refuelling with 64,000 pounds (29,000 kg) of fuel while Biglands flew on with the Vulcan, but Tuxford now took Biglands's place. A quick calculation showed that he did not have enough fuel to make it back to Ascension. It fell to Tuxford to conduct the final refuelling. Withers received 7,000 pounds (3,200 kg) less than he expected. This meant that he would be making the return fuelling rendezvous with 7,000 pounds (3,200 kg) in his tanks instead of 14,000 pounds (6,400 kg).

Now alone, Withers flew on to the Falklands. He made his approach at low level, dropping to 300 feet (91 m) before climbing to 1,000 feet (300 m) for the bomb run 40 miles (64 km) from the target. To verify their position and minimise the risk of civilian casualties, the H2S radar was successfully locked on to the 2,313-foot (705 m) peak of Mount Usborne, 33 miles (53 km) west of Stanley, before the automated bombing control system was engaged. Withers made the final approach at 10,000 feet (3,000 m), with an airspeed of 330 knots (610 km/h). The Vulcan's electronic countermeasures defeated the radar systems controlling the defending Skyguard anti-aircraft cannons. The twenty-one bombs were dropped. Once all were away, Withers put the Vulcan into a 60-degree bank to the left, subjecting the crew to 2 g (20 m/s^{2}), twice the force of gravity. Sea Harriers of 801 Naval Air Squadron (NAS) were held at readiness on board the aircraft carrier HMS Invincible to protect the Vulcan, but were not required as no Argentine aircraft were in the area at the time of the attack. The Sea Harriers went into action shortly after the Vulcan raid. Two of the aircraft flew over Port Stanley airport to photograph the damage caused by the Vulcan.

Withers climbed away from the airfield and headed nearly due north to a planned rendezvous with a Victor some way off the Brazilian coast near Rio de Janeiro. As they passed the British Task Force, the crew signalled the code word "superfuse" indicating a successful attack at 0746Z. Their journey continued within range of the South American coast to the rendezvous with a Victor flown by Squadron Leader Barry Neal. After contacting control with an update, the tanker was sent further south. To help bring the two planes together, one of Ascension's two Nimrod maritime reconnaissance aircraft flew from Wideawake to the area. Without an in-flight refuelling system, it was unable to remain for long. Tuxford, who had continued to maintain radio silence lest he compromise the mission, picked up the "superfuse" signal and radioed Ascension for help. A Victor flown by his squadron commander, Wing Commander Colin Seymour, flew out to meet him, and refuelled Tuxford's Victor, enabling him to return to Ascension 14 hours and 5 minutes after he had left. Meanwhile, with the help of the Nimrod, Withers made the rendezvous with Neal, and all three aircraft returned to Ascension safely. Withers touched down at 1452Z.

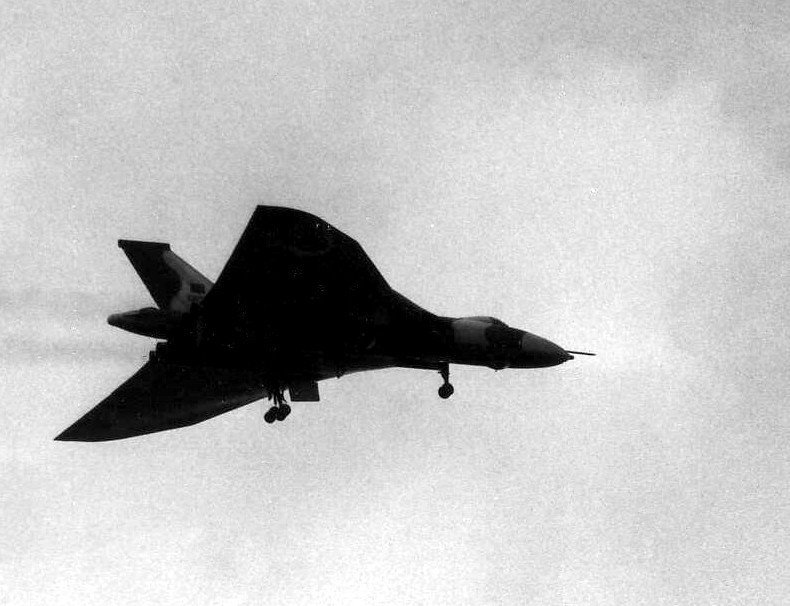
A Vulcan bomber makes an approach to land at Ascension Island at dusk

Northwood Headquarters received the "superfuse" message by 0830Z and the Ministry of Defence shortly thereafter. Beetham was informed by his deputy, Air Vice Marshal Kenneth Hayr, an hour later. The news of the bombing raid was reported on the BBC World Service before either the Vulcan or the last tanker arrived back at Ascension. The bombardment is believed to have killed three Argentine personnel at the airport and injured several more. One bomb exploded on the runway and caused a large crater which proved difficult to repair, and the other bombs caused minor damage to aircraft and equipment. The shortened runway remained in action.

Later that morning, twelve 800 Naval Air Squadron Sea Harriers were dispatched from the aircraft carrier HMS Hermes to attack targets on East Falkland. Nine of the aircraft struck Port Stanley Airport and dropped 27 bombs on the airfield and its defences. The bombs set a stockpile of fuel on fire and may have slightly damaged the runway. One of the Sea Harriers was struck by a 20 mm anti-aircraft round, which damaged its fin and tailplane; the aircraft managed to return to Hermes and was quickly repaired. The Argentine air defence headquarters incorrectly assessed British losses as three aircraft destroyed.

The other three 800 NAS Sea Harriers attacked the airfield at Goose Green with cluster bombs shortly after the raid on Port Stanley, resulting in the destruction of a Pucará and severe damage to another two. The pilot of the destroyed aircraft and five maintenance personnel were killed. Neither of the two damaged aircraft flew again. The three British aircraft did not encounter any opposition and safely returned to Hermes. After the aircraft were refuelled, 800 NAS began launching Sea Harriers on combat air patrol sorties. 801 NAS maintained a four-aircraft combat air patrol to the east of Port Stanley throughout the operation.

On 8 October 1982, Withers was awarded the Distinguished Flying Cross for his part in the action, and his crew—Flying Officer P. I. Taylor (co-pilot), Flight Lieutenant R. D. Wright (radar plotter), Flight Lieutenant G. C. Graham (navigator), Flight Lieutenant H. Prior (air electronics officer) and Flight Lieutenant R. J. Russell (air-to-air refuelling instructor)—were Mentioned in Dispatches. Tuxford was awarded the Air Force Cross, while his crew—Squadron Leader E. F. Wallis, Flight Lieutenant M. E. Beer, Flight Lieutenant J. N. Keable and Flight Lieutenant G. D. Rees—received the Queen's Commendation for Valuable Service in the Air.

=== Black Buck Two ===
During the night of 3–4 May, a Vulcan flown by Squadron Leader John Reeve and his crew of No. 50 Squadron, flew a near-identical mission to the first. This time, a Vulcan piloted by Squadron Leader Alastair Montgomery, acted as flying reserve aircraft, but was not required. As with Black Buck One, the approach to Port Stanley over the final 200 nautical miles (370 km; 230 mi) was made at low altitude, with a final "pop-up" to a higher altitude, 16,000 feet (4,900 m), for the bomb run in order to avoid the now fully alert Argentine anti-aircraft defences, particularly the Argentine Roland surface-to-air missiles. As a result, all the bombs missed the runway. This was not known for several days, as the weather conditions precluded photo-reconnaissance missions. According to Argentine sources, which also confirm impacts near the western end of the airstrip, two Argentine soldiers were wounded. The cratering at the western end of the runway prevented Argentine engineers from extending it sufficiently to make it capable of accommodating high-performance combat aircraft. The runway remained in use by Hercules and light transport aircraft, allowing the Argentines to fly in critical supplies and evacuate wounded personnel.

=== Black Buck Three ===
Following Black Buck Two there was a break in Vulcan operations as the tankers were needed to support submarine-hunting missions conducted by Nimrods; each Nimrod sortie to protect the naval task force required 18 supporting tanker sorties. The two Vulcans returned to Waddington on 7 May, but one redeployed to Wideawake on 15 May to be the primary aircraft for Black Buck Three. Another, that had arrived from Waddington on 14 May, was the reserve aircraft for the mission. Scheduled for 16 May, Black Buck Three was cancelled before takeoff due to strong headwinds. The two Vulcans returned to Waddington on 20 and 23 May.

=== Black Buck Four ===
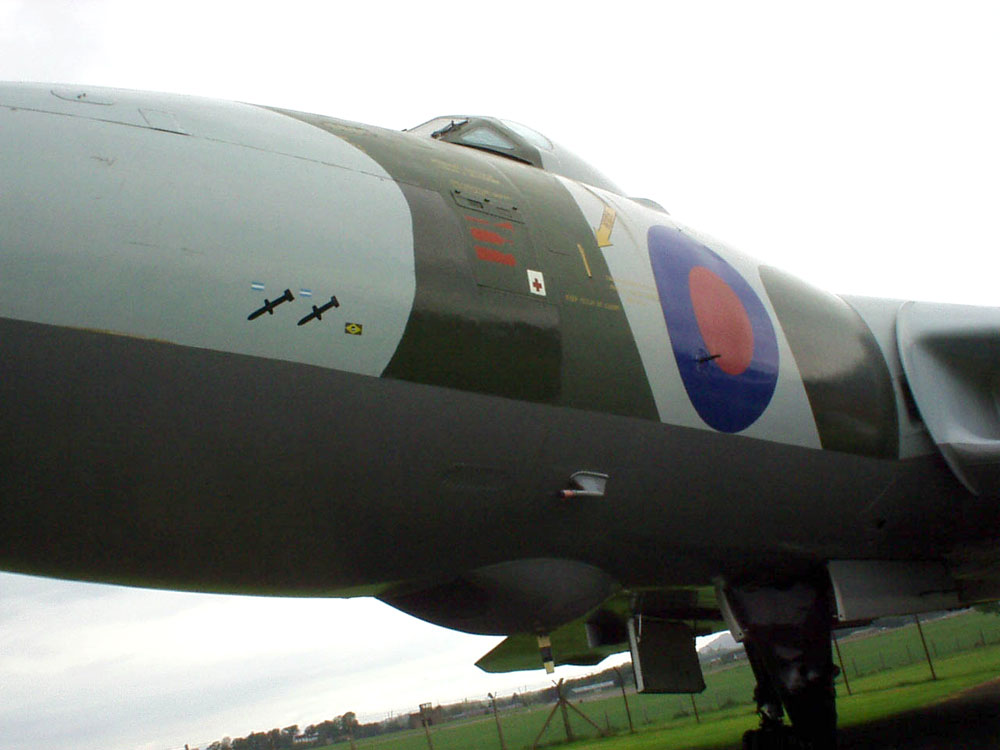
XM597 preserved at the National Museum of Flight in East Fortune, showing mission markings from its two Black Buck missions and Brazilian internment.

The Black Buck Four mission was due to be the first using American-supplied Shrike anti-radar missiles, which were mounted on the Vulcans using improvised underwing pylons. These weapons had not previously been used by Vulcans, but arrangements for fitting them to the aircraft and the trials programme were completed in just ten days. Vulcans equipped with Shrike allowed the Vulcan to carry an additional 16,000 pounds (7,300 kg) of fuel in bomb bay tanks, which extended their range and reduced the number of refuelling contacts needed on the flight to the Falklands to four.

The primary aircraft was a Vulcan flown by Squadron Leader Neil McDougall and his crew from No. 50 Squadron that arrived at Wideawake on 27 May, with Montgomery flying the reserve aircraft. The mission was scheduled for 28 May, but was also cancelled, but only some five hours after they had taken off. One of the supporting Victor refuelling aircraft suffered a failure of the hose-and-drogue refuelling unit, and the flight had to be recalled.

=== Black Buck Five ===
Black Buck Five was flown by McDougall with Montgomery reprising his role flying the reserve aircraft. This was the first completed anti-radar mission equipped with Shrike missiles. The main target was a Westinghouse AN/TPS-43 long-range 3D radar that the Argentine Air Force deployed during April to guard the airspace surrounding the Falkland Islands. The warning that this radar gave enabled the Argentine defenders to conceal mobile Exocet missile launchers. It also gave Argentine Hercules transports the warning they needed to continue using the runway at Stanley. An attack on the radar with Shrike missiles could only succeed if the targeted radar continued transmitting until struck, so a Sea Harrier raid was staged to coincide with the attack to force the defenders to turn on the radar. At 0845Z two Shrikes were launched at it. The first missile impacted 10 to 15 yards (9.1 to 13.7 m) from the target, causing minor blast damage, but not disabling the radar. The second missile missed by a greater margin.

=== Black Buck Six ===
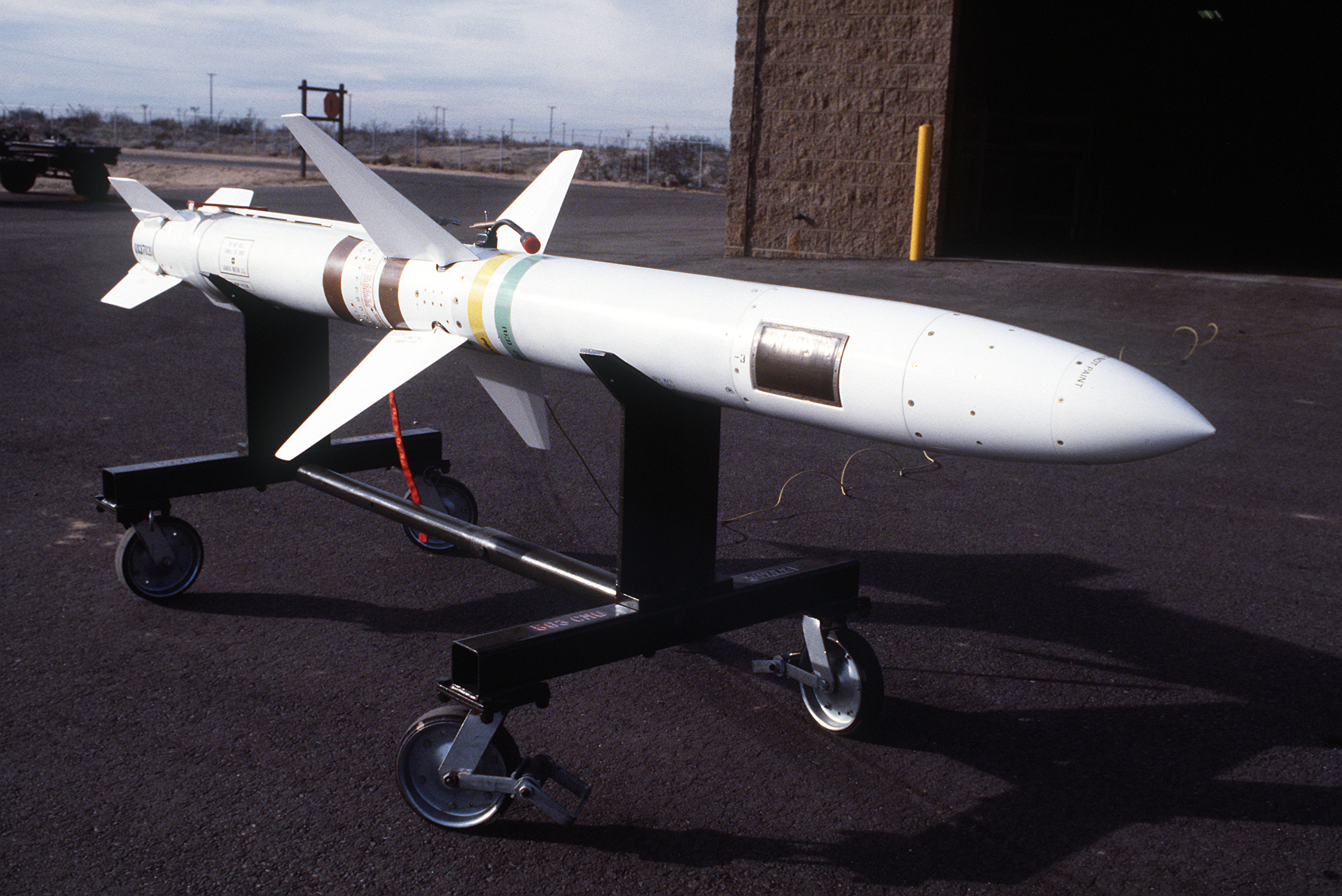
An AGM-45 Shrike anti-radiation missile on a trolley.

Black Buck Six was flown on 3 June by McDougall, whose Vulcan was now armed with four Shrike missiles instead of just two. Montgomery again flew the reserve aircraft. McDougall loitered over the target for 40 minutes in a vain effort to engage the AN/TPS-43, which was not switched on. Finally, the crew fired two of the four Shrikes, which destroyed a Skyguard fire-control radar of the Argentine Army's 601 Anti-Aircraft Battalion, killing four radar operators.

On its return flight McDougall was forced to divert to Rio de Janeiro after his in-flight refuelling probe broke. One of the missiles he was carrying was ditched into the ocean to reduce drag, but the other remained stuck on the pylon and could not be released. Sensitive documents containing classified information were jettisoned into the sea via the crew hatch, and a "Mayday" signal was sent. Two Northrop F-5E Tiger II fighters from 2° Esquadrão do 1° Grupo de Aviação de Caça of the Brazilian Air Force were scrambled from Santa Cruz Airfield and intercepted the Vulcan. The aircraft was cleared to land at Galeão Airport by Brazilian authorities with less than 2,000 pounds (910 kg) of fuel remaining, not enough to complete a circuit of the airport.

This was a potentially embarrassing international incident, as it revealed that the United States had supplied the British with Shrike missiles. British diplomats negotiated for the release of the Vulcan and its crew, who were interned at Galeão Air Force Base. A deal was struck on 4 June under which they would be released in exchange for spare parts for Westland Lynx helicopters. Brazil came under pressure from Argentina, and the United States agreed to intervene to preserve the secrets of the Shrike missile. The crew and aircraft were permitted to fly to Ascension on 10 June. A new refuelling probe was fitted there, and the aircraft flew back to Waddington on 13 June. The remaining Shrike missile remained in Brazil.

=== Black Buck Seven ===
The final Black Buck mission was flown on 12 June by Withers, and with the same crew as for Black Buck One except that Flight Lieutenant Peter Standing acted as Air-to-Air Refuelling Instructor instead of Russell. Montgomery once again flew the reserve aircraft. This time the mission targeted Argentine troop positions and facilities around the airport instead of the runway. The bombs were fused in error to explode on impact; the end of the war was in sight and the intention had been for them to air burst to destroy aircraft and stores without damaging the runway, which would soon be needed for RAF Phantom FGR.2 operations after the Falkland Islands were recaptured. In the event, all 21 bombs missed the intended targets. The Argentine ground forces surrendered two days later.

== Effect ==
Aerial reconnaissance photo of Port Stanley Airport. The craters from Black Buck One's bombs are visible in the middle. Black Buck Two's craters are visible more clearly to the left.

The military effectiveness of Black Buck remains controversial, with some independent sources describing it as "minimal". The runway continued to be used by Argentine C-130 Hercules transport aircraft until the end of the war, although after 1 May only 70 tonnes (69 long tons) of supplies and 340 troops were delivered, and early flights were suspended after 4 May, as Black Buck missions occurred in the early morning hours. Woodward has stated that he "fully expected" Hercules flights to continue after Black Buck One, but that he "did not care too much about that" at the time since, unlike fast jets, they were not a direct threat to the naval forces. The British were aware that Hercules flights continued to use the airfield and attempted to interdict these flights, leading to the downing of a Hercules on 1 June. In view of the airport's lack of impact on the ultimate outcome of the campaign, the British targeting of Stanley airport was questionable.

Planning for the raid called for a bomb run in a 35° cut across the runway, with the aim of placing at least one bomb on the runway and possibly two. The main purpose in doing so was to prevent the use of the runway by fast jets; in this respect the raid was successful as the repair to the runway was botched and subsequently there were several near accidents. The fact that the British forces could penetrate Argentine air defences and attack the airfield had the desired effect in relation to preventing fast jet usage of the Port Stanley airstrip as the Argentine military command could not risk stationing its fast jets and the infrastructure necessary to operate them on the islands if they could be destroyed on the ground, irrespective of the operational status of the runway. Admiral Woodward considered it vital to keep fast jets from using Port Stanley, to reduce the threat of air attack on the British aircraft carriers. Starting on 1 May, the Royal Navy attacked Port Stanley with aerial bombing by Sea Harriers and naval bombardment, in order to hamper Argentine repair efforts. The Argentines left the runway covered with piles of earth during the day, leading to claims this caused British intelligence to surmise that repairs were still in progress and misleading the British as to the condition of the airfield and the success of their raids.

Commander Nigel (Sharkey) Ward, the commander of 801 NAS, who flew a Sea Harrier to protect Black Buck One from fighter attack, was highly critical of Operation Black Buck. He calculated that for the quantity of fuel expended by Black Buck One to drop 21 bombs, which he estimated at 1,800,000 litres (400,000 imp gal) at a cost of £3.3 million, the Sea Harriers of the carrier force could have carried out 785 sorties that would have delivered 2,357 bombs. Ward dismissed as RAF propaganda the claim that the raids led to fear of attacks on the mainland:

Propaganda was, of course, used later to try to justify these missions: "The Mirage IIIs were redrawn from Southern Argentina to Buenos Aires to add to the defences there following the Vulcan raids on the islands." Apparently, the logic behind this statement was that if the Vulcan could hit Port Stanley, the [sic] Buenos Aires was well within range as well and was vulnerable to similar attacks. I never went along with that baloney. A lone Vulcan or two running into attack Buenos Aires without fighter support would have been shot to hell in quick time.

There is no evidence that Mirage IIIs were withdrawn from southern Argentina to protect Buenos Aires. On 29 April, Argentine radars at Puerto San Julián detected a suspected British air strike and aircraft from there were moved to Comodoro Rivadavia, but they still remained in southern Argentina.

The British intended to convince the Argentine forces that an amphibious assault on Port Stanley was imminent, and Admiral Woodward saw Black Buck One as an important contribution to this effort, alongside naval attacks and deception efforts. The author of Vulcan 607, Rowland White, claimed that Vice Admiral Juan Lombardo was led to believe that Black Buck One was the prelude to a full-scale landing by the British. As a consequence, he ordered Rear Admiral Gualter Allara, the commander of the Argentine Sea Fleet, to immediately attack the British fleet. This attack took the form of a pincer movement, with the light cruiser ARA General Belgrano to the south and aircraft carrier ARA Veinticinco de Mayo to the north. On 2 May, General Belgrano was sunk by the submarine HMS Conqueror. Thereafter the Argentine Navy withdrew to territorial waters and played no further part in the conflict.

A United States Marine Corps study concluded that:

The most critical judgement of the use of the Vulcan centres on the argument that their use was "...largely to prove [the air force] had some role to play and not to help the battle in the least." This illustrates the practice of armed services to actively seek a "piece of the action" when a conflict arises, even if their capabilities or mission are not compatible with the circumstances of the conflict. Using Black Buck as an example shows the effects of this practice can be trivial and the results not worth the effort involved.
