= AN/ALQ-101 countermeasures pod =

Military aircraft electronic countermeasures pod

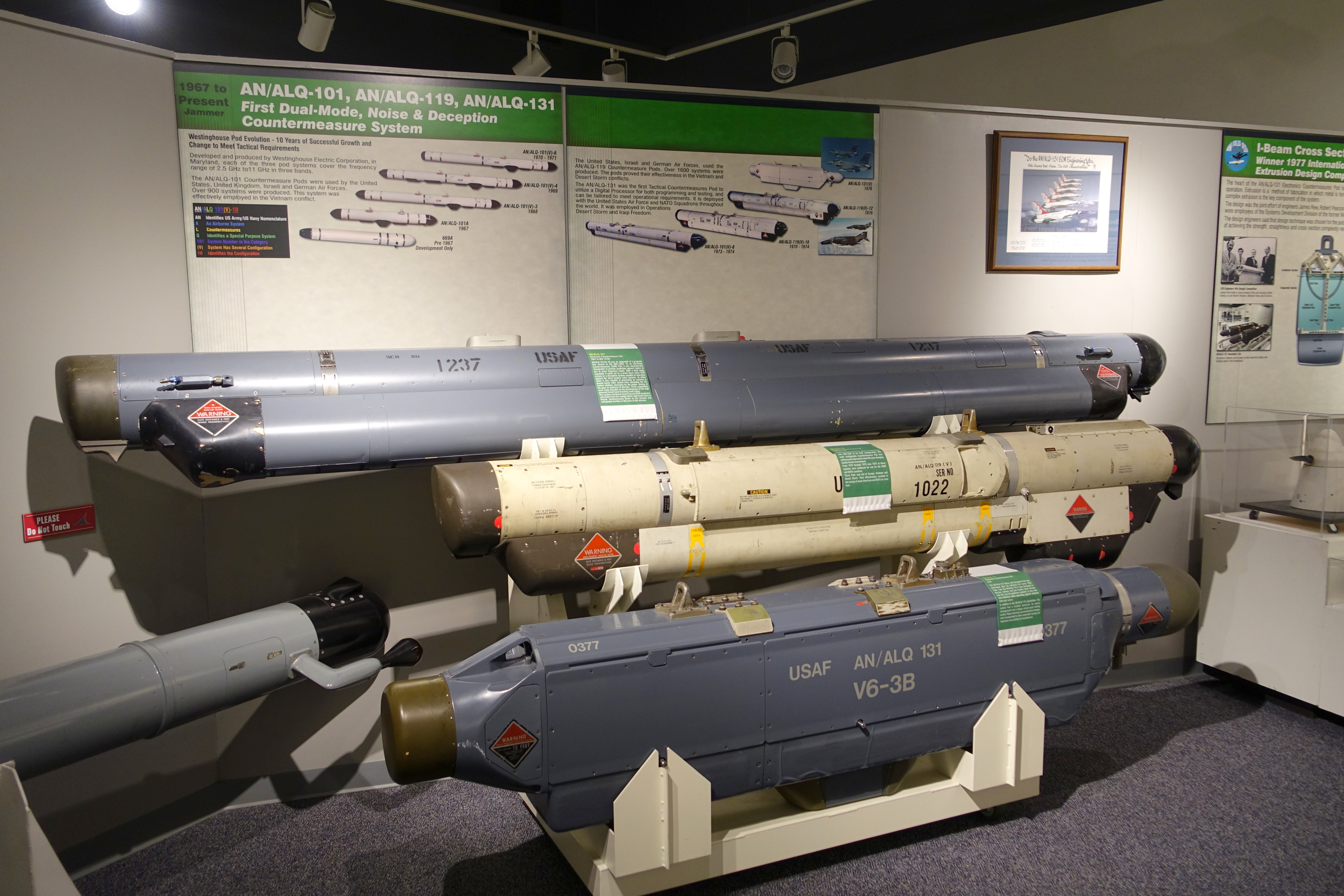
The countermeasure systems AN/ALQ-101, AN/ALQ-119 and AN/ALQ-131 in the National Electronics Museum. The AN/ALQ-101 can be seen in the rear of picture.

AN/ALQ-101 is an electronic countermeasures (ECM) pod used on aircraft such as the Blackburn Buccaneer at RAF Honington. It was also used in the Falklands War by the Avro Vulcan bomber during Operation Black Buck.

The system was developed and manufactured by Westinghouse Electronic Systems in Baltimore, Maryland. Its use by the RAF on Buccaneer Aircraft based at RAF Honington and RAF Lossiemouth was supported by Ferranti based in Edinburgh, Scotland who introduced a major update to the system. The modifications to adapt it for use on the Vulcan aircraft were carried out by the RAF.

In accordance with the Joint Electronics Type Designation System (JETDS), the "AN/ALQ-101" designation represents the 101st design of an Army-Navy airborne electronic device for special countermeasures equipment. The JETDS system also now is used to name all Department of Defense and some NATO electronic systems.

== Functionality ==
Carried externally on a pylon under the wing of the attacking aircraft, the ALQ-101 pod is used to counter radar guided weapons. It operates by manipulating the radar signals transmitted from such weapon systems and re-broadcasting them back to the sender in a convincing but highly deceptive manner. The intention is to trick the enemy air-defense system into aiming at an imaginary target which is located some miles distant from the aircraft fitted with the ALQ-101 pod. Because enemy air defense systems appear to work normally whilst the pod is operating, the enemy personnel monitoring them do not realize that they are being deceived.

== See also ==
- List of military electronics of the United States
- Similar US military aircraft ECM systems
