= Light fighter =

Class of fighter aircraft

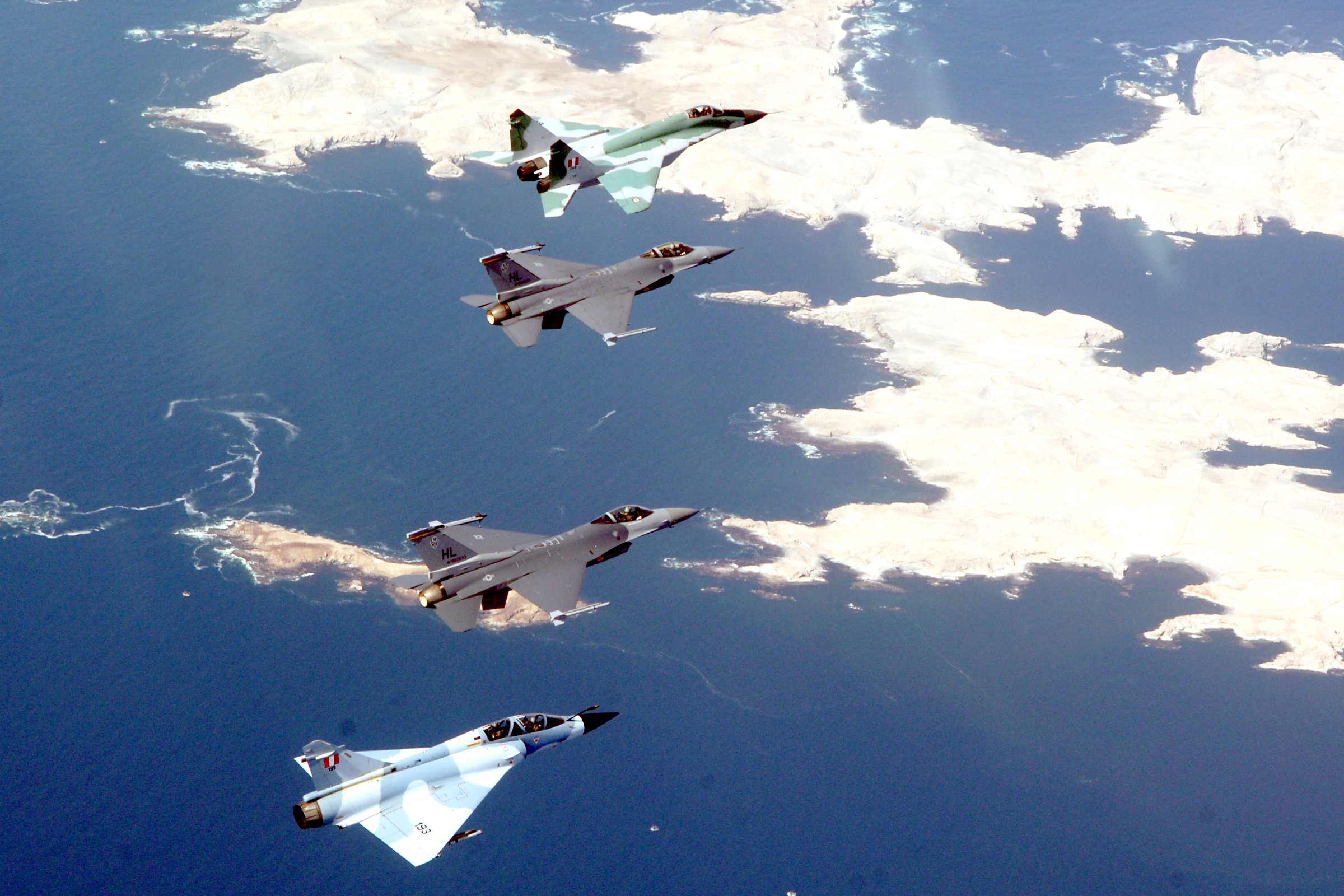
Mikoyan MiG-29, General Dynamics/Lockheed Martin F-16 Fighting Falcon and Dassault Mirage 2000 are popular series of light fighters. Being Cold War designs, they are still influential to contemporary air forces.

A light fighter or lightweight fighter is a fighter aircraft towards the low end of the practical range of weight, cost, and complexity over which fighters are fielded. The light or lightweight fighter retains carefully selected competitive features, in order to provide cost-effective design and performance.

A well-designed lightweight fighter is able to match or better a heavier type plane-for-plane in many missions, and for lower cost. The lightweight class can therefore be strategically valuable.

In attempts to scale this efficiency to still lower cost, some manufacturers have in recent years adopted the term “light fighter” to also refer to light primarily air-to-ground attack aircraft, some of which are modified trainer designs. These lower cost lightweight attack aircraft have become known as light combat aircraft (LCAs), and are sometimes considered to include some multirole light fighters.

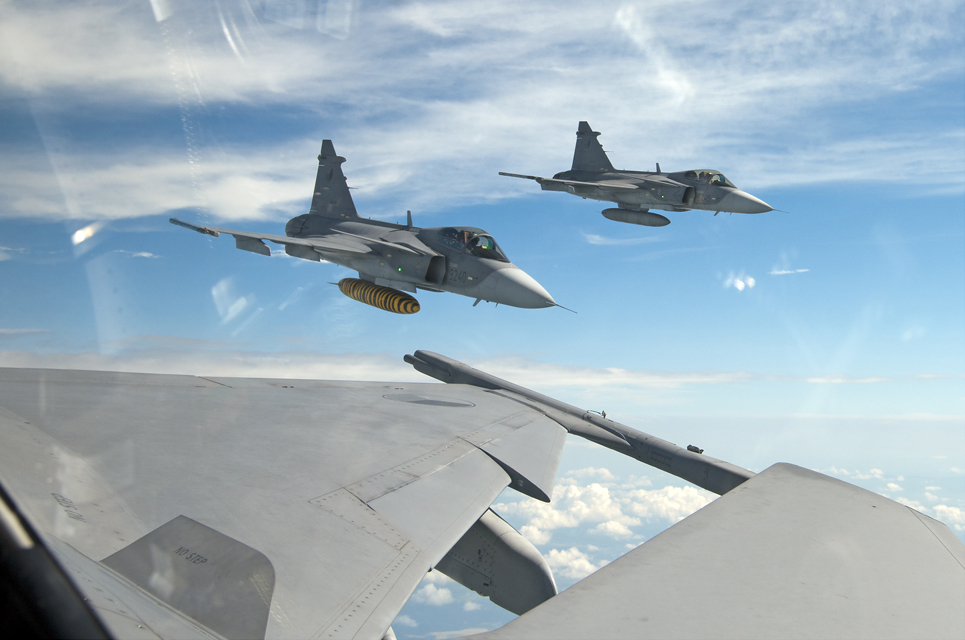
Czech Saab JAS 39 Gripen

From 1926 the light fighter concept has been a regular thread in the development of fighter aircraft, with some notable designs entering large-scale use. From the early interwar period until the early Cold War period, such designs stood in contrast to heavy fighters, which were typically twin-engined, heavier, larger, and more heavily-armed.

== Design aims ==
A key design goal of light/lightweight fighter design is to satisfy standard air-to-air fighter effectiveness requirements at minimum cost. These criteria, in order of importance, are the ability to benefit from the element of surprise, to have numerical superiority in the air, to have superior maneuverability, and to possess adequate weapon systems effectiveness. Light fighters typically achieve a surprise advantage over larger aircraft due to smaller visual and radar signatures, which is important since in the majority of air-to-air kills, the element of surprise is dominant. Their comparative lower cost and higher reliability also allows for greater numbers per budget. Finally, while a single engine light fighter would typically only carry about half the weapons load of a heavy twin engine fighter, its surprise and maneuverability advantages often allow it to gain positional advantage to make better use of those weapons.

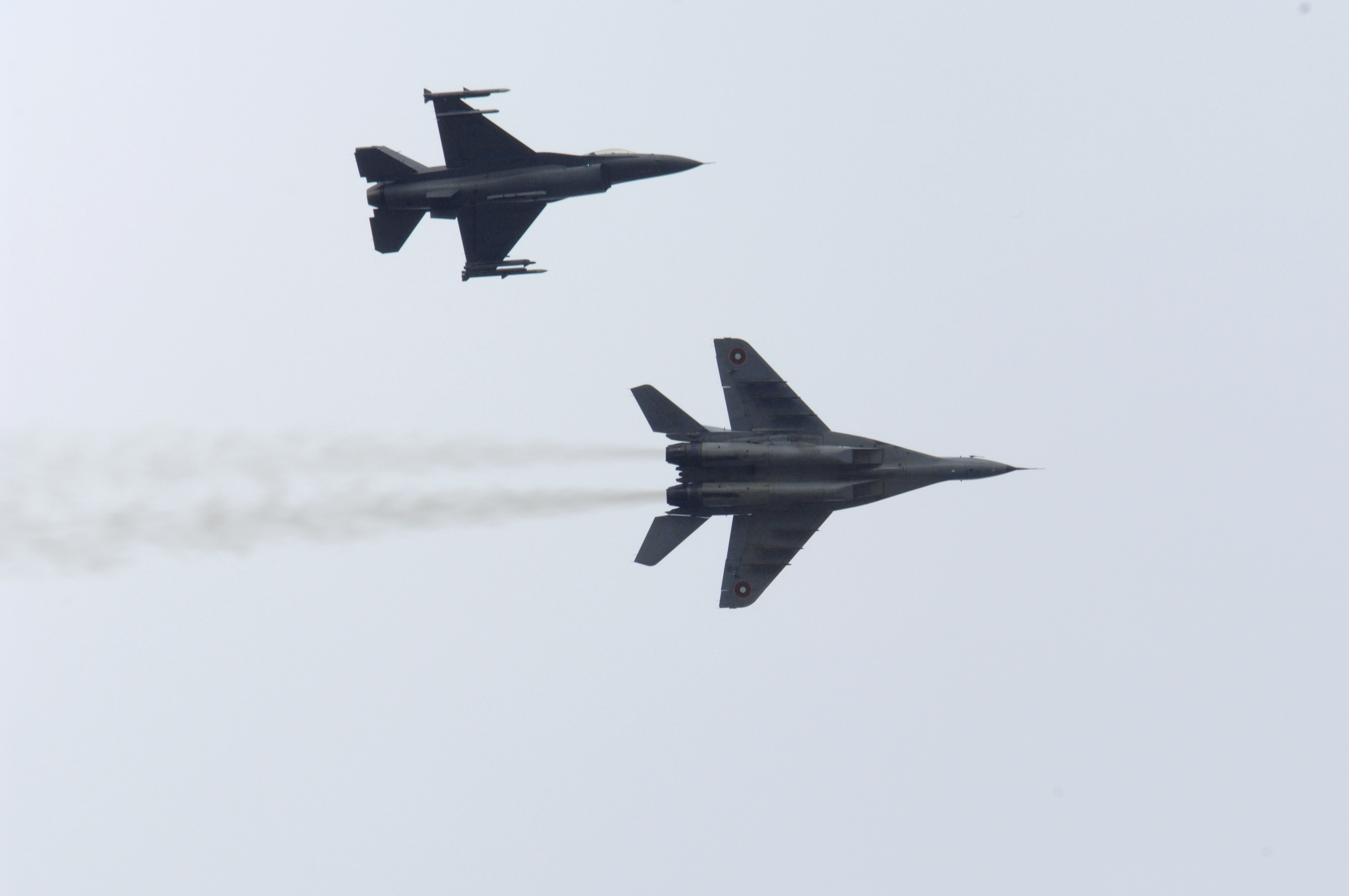
Even though most light fighters prefer single-engine designs, this is not the case with other significant examples such as the Mikoyan MiG-29, AIDC F-CK-1, and their related developments that pursue the two-engine configuration.

A requirement for low cost and therefore small fighters first arose in the period between World War I and World War II. Examples include several RAF interceptor designs from the interwar era and French "Jockey" aircraft of the immediate pre-World War II. None of these very light fighters enjoyed success into World War II, as they were too hampered in performance. Similar to the meaning of lightweight fighter today, during World War II the term “small fighter” was used to describe a single engine aircraft of competitive performance, range, and armament load, but with no unnecessary weight and cost.

=== Effectiveness ===
The modern view of light/lightweight fighters is as a capable weapon intended to satisfy the main criteria of air-to-air combat effectiveness, which in order of importance, are:

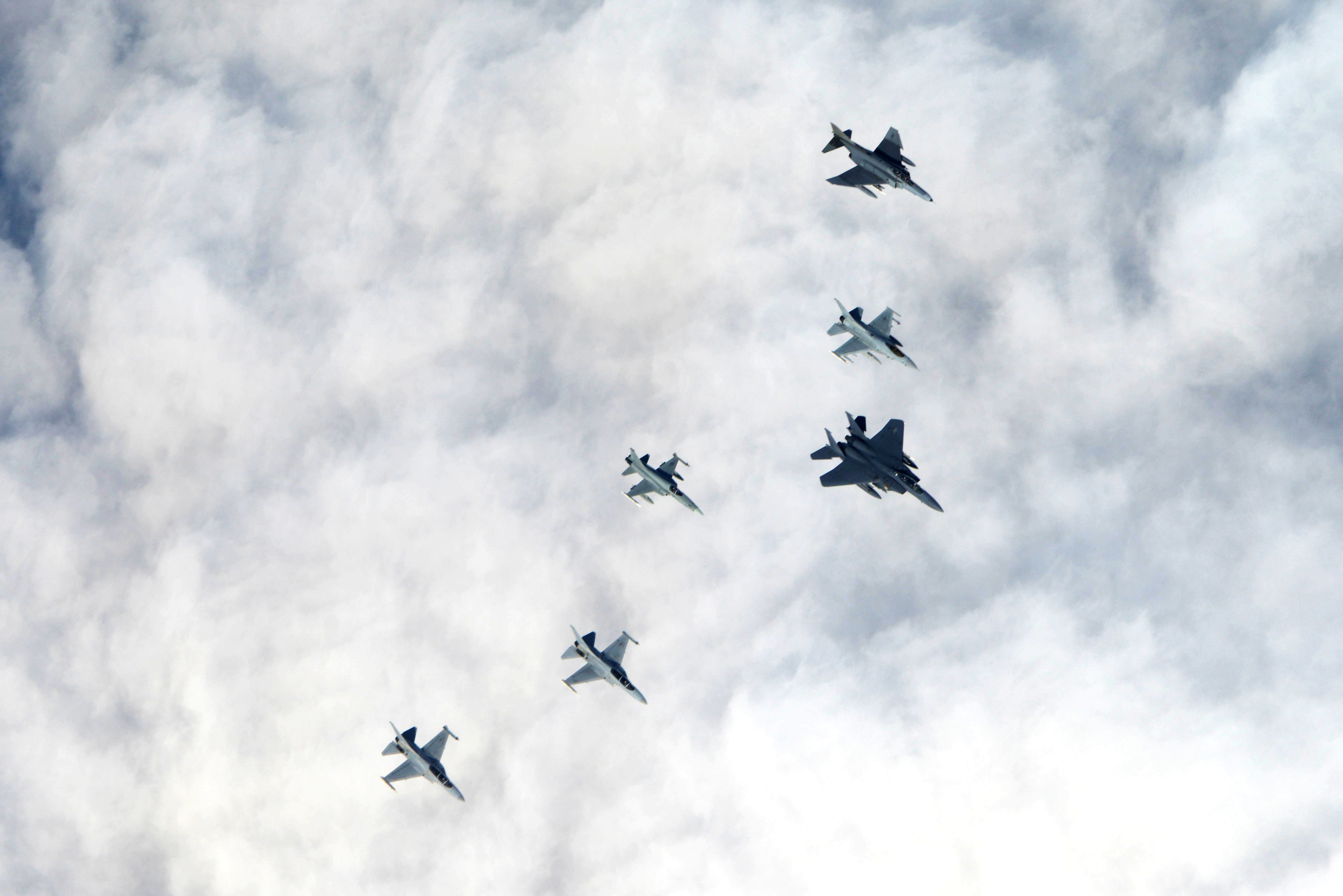
Light fighters are generally small, and their smaller RCS mechanically makes them harder to detect than larger and heavier fighters.

1. Superiority in the element of surprise, to be aware of the enemy before they are aware of you. In past combats, surprise advantage has been mostly based upon small visual and radar signatures, and having good visibility out of the cockpit. Surprise is a significant advantage, since historically in about 80% of air-to-air kills, the victim was unaware of the attacker until too late.

As the former editor of 'The Topgun Journal', the author asked hundreds of pilots over a six-year period what single advantage they would like to have, that is, longer-range missiles, more guns, better maneuverability, etc. To a pilot they all said 'The first sighting.'

— James Stevenson, The Pentagon Paradox.

Small fighters like the F-5 with a planform area of about 300 square feet (28 m^{2}) or the F-16 at about 400 square feet (37 m^{2}), compared to about 1,050 square feet (98 m^{2}) for the F-15, have a much lower visual profile. The small fighter is typically invisible to opposing pilots beyond about 4 miles (6.4 km), whereas a larger fighter such as the F-15 is visible to about 7 miles (11 km). This is a non-linear advantage to the light fighter opposing a heavy fighter. Additionally, smaller targets take longer to visually acquire even if they are visible. These two factors together give the light fighter pilot much better statistical odds of seeing the heavy fighter first and setting up a decisive first shot. Once the small fighter sees and turns towards the opponent its very small frontal area reduces maximum visual detection range to about 2 to 2.5 miles (3.2 to 4.0 km).

Given similar technology, smaller fighters typically have about two thirds the radar range against the same target as heavy fighters. (Note: The technical reasons for the modest increase in range of heavy fighter radar as compared to lightweight fighter radar in similar technology are covered in Stimson, 1983, pp. 163 to 190. In general, the radar ranges of modern airborne radars are significantly greater than the ability to identify targets as hostile in order to satisfy the rules of engagement and fire a BVR missile.) However, this cannot be counted upon to give the large fighter a winning advantage, as larger fighters with typical radar cross sectional area of about 10 square metres (110 sq ft) are detectable by a given radar at about 50% further range than the 2 to 3 square metres (22 to 32 sq ft) cross section of the light fighter. This approximately balances these trade-offs, and can sometimes favor the lightweight fighter. For example, from the front the F-15 actually presents about 20 square metres (220 sq ft) radar cross sectional area, and has been typically defeated by opposing F-16 forces not only in close dogfighting combat, but also in extensive Beyond Visual Range (BVR) trials. Also, airborne fighter radars are limited: their coverage is only to the front, and are far from perfect in detecting enemy aircraft. Although radar was extensively used by the United States in the Vietnam War, only 18% of North Vietnamese fighters were first detected by radar, and only 3% by radar on fighter aircraft. The other 82% were visually acquired.

The modern trend to stealth aircraft is an attempt to maximize surprise in an era when Beyond Visual Range (BVR) missiles are becoming more effective than the quite low effectiveness BVR has had in the past.

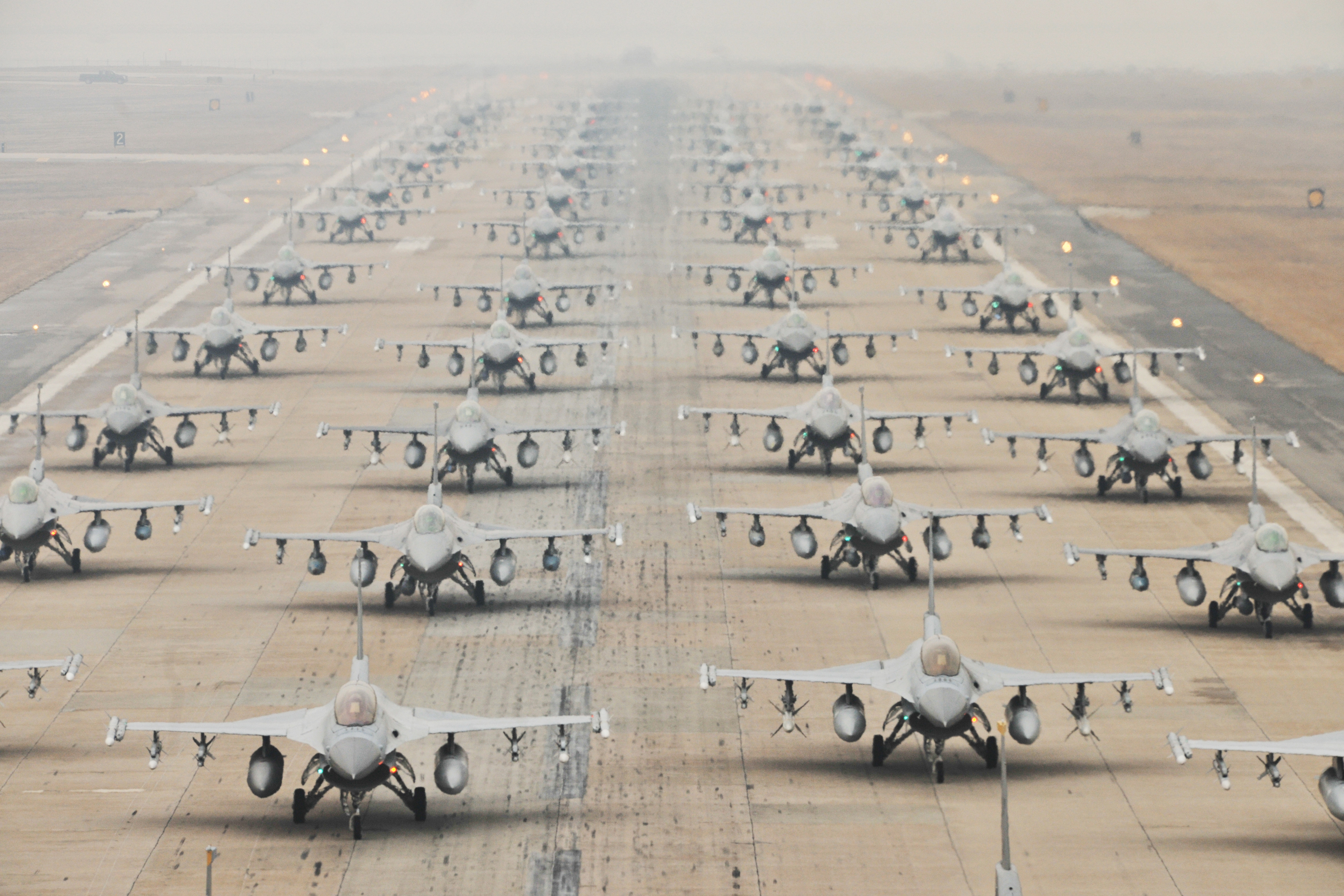
Light fighters tend to be significantly cheaper to procure and operate than their heavier counterparts, allowing a numerically-bigger fleet with the same budget.

2. Numerical superiority in the air, which implies the need for lower procurement cost, lower maintenance cost, and higher reliability. Not even taking into account the sometimes superior combat capability of lighter aircraft based on surprise and maneuverability, the pure numbers issue of lower cost and higher reliability (higher sortie rates) also tends to favor light fighters. It is a basic outcome of Lanchester's laws, or the salvo combat model, that a larger number of less-sophisticated units will tend to be successful over a smaller number of more advanced ones; the damage dealt is based on the square of the number of units firing, while the quality of those units has only a linear effect on the outcome. This non-linear relationship favors the light and lightweight fighter.

Additionally, as pilot capability is actually the top consideration in maximizing total effectiveness of the pilot-aircraft system, (Note: "In every war, it's the few superb pilots that win the air battle. A tiny handful of such pilots have dominated every air-to-air battleground since World War I: roughly 10 percent of all pilots (the “hawks”) score 60 percent to 80 percent of the dogfight kills; the other 90 percent of pilots (“doves”) are the fodder for the hawks of the opposing side. Technical performance differences between opposing fighter planes pale in comparison." Pierre Sprey, "Evaluating Weapons: Sorting the Good from the Bad", The Pentagon Labyrinth: 10 Short Essays to Help You Through It, 2011, Center for Defense, http://pogoarchives.org/labyrinth/09-sprey-w-covers.pdf) the lower purchase and operational cost of light fighters permits more training, thus delivering more effective pilots. For example, as of 2013, total heavy F-15C operating cost is reported at US$41,900 per hour, and light F-16C cost at US$22,500 per hour.

3. Superior maneuverability, which in maneuvering combat allows getting into superior position to fire and score the kill. This is a function of achieving lower wing loading, higher thrust to weight ratio, and superior aerodynamics. This is sometimes described colloquially as “wrapping the smallest possible airframe around the most powerful available engine.” Professional analysis through 4th generation fighters shows that among heavier fighters only the F-15 has been generally competitive with lighter fighters, and its maneuvering performance is exceeded by several lighter fighters such as the F-16. Light fighters have no inherent aerodynamic advantage for speed and range, but when designed to be as simple as possible they do tend to have lower wing loading and higher thrust to weight ratio. Additionally, smaller fighters are lower in inertia, allowing a faster transient response in maneuvering combat.

4. Weapon systems effectiveness. This area is one where the light fighter can be at a disadvantage, since the combat load of a single engine light fighter is typically about half of a twin engine heavy fighter. However, modern single engine light fighters such as the General Dynamics F-16 Fighting Falcon and the Saab JAS 39 Gripen generally carry similar cannon and air-to-air missile fighter weapons as heavier fighters. Actual aerial combat in the modern era is of short duration, typically about two minutes, and as only a small fraction of this is spent actually firing, modest weapons load outs are generally effective. The ideal weapons load for a modern fighter is considered to be an internal gun and two to four guided missiles, a load that modern light fighters are fully capable of while maintaining high agility. For example, the JAS 39 Gripen, despite being the lightest major fighter in current production, carries a combat load of a 27mm cannon and up to six air-to-air missiles of the same types as carried by heavy fighters. Additionally, combat experience shows that weapons systems "effectiveness" has not been dominated by the amount of weaponry or "load out", but by the ability to achieve split second kills when in position to do so.

=== Concept summary ===
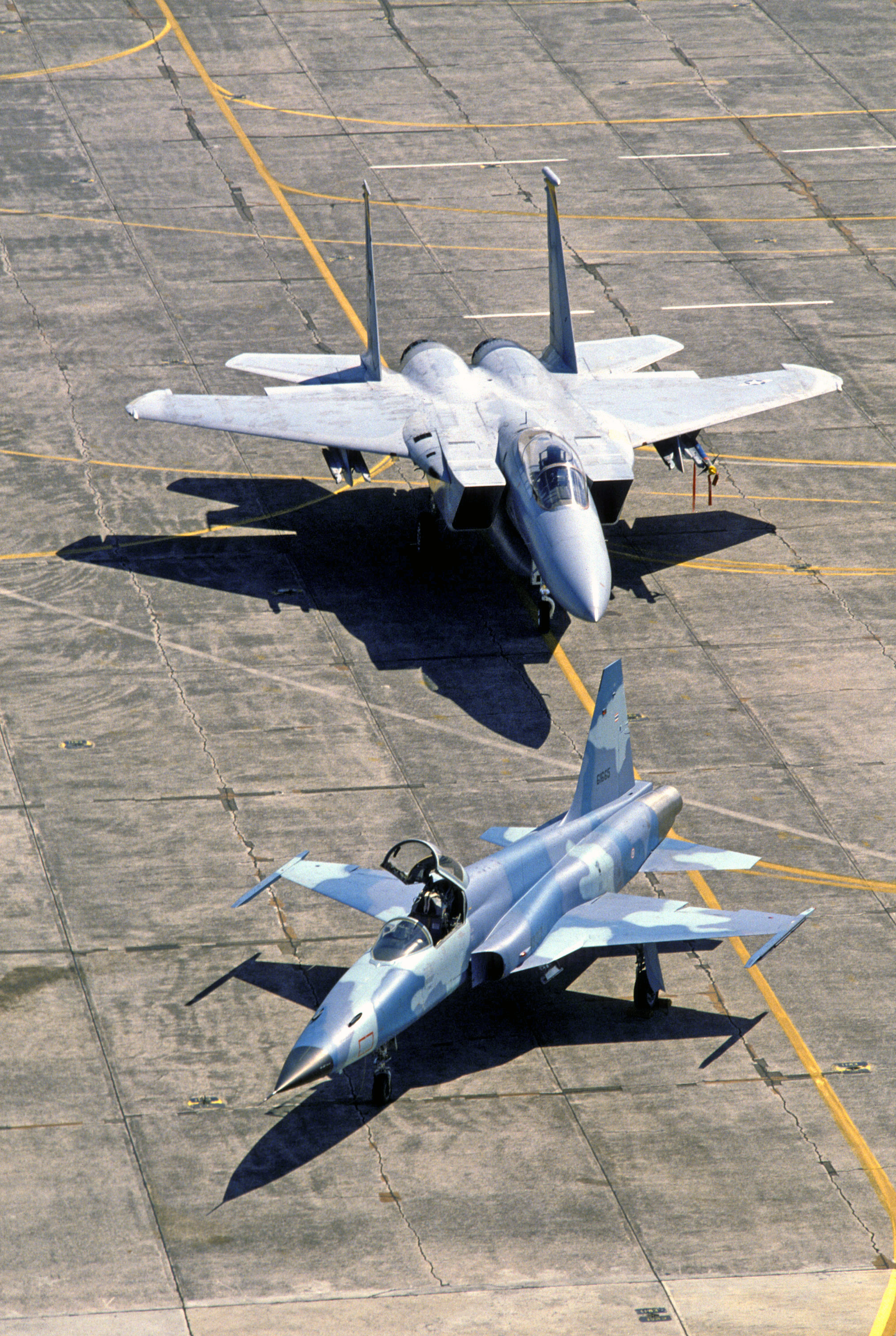
A light F-5 in front of a heavy F-15.

Superior technology has often been quoted as a strong factor favoring the heavy fighter. The specific argument usually presented is that heavy fighters have superior radar range and longer range BVR missiles that take advantage of that range. This radar range advantage is one of the major reasons for the existence of the modern heavy fighter, but it has not turned out to be a significant advantage in air combat history to date for several reasons. A major reason has been because long range BVR missile shots have often been unusable, and often unreliable when they could be taken. The weight of the larger missiles also reduces performance and range needed to get in position to fire. Due to these factors, between 1958 and 1982 in five wars there were 2,014 missile firings by fighter pilots engaged in air-to-air combat, but there were only four beyond-visual-range kills.

The more general and often misunderstood argument for more technology that has been historically assumed to favor heavy fighters is not just better radar but better systems support for the fighter pilot in other ways as well. Examples include all weather capability, precise electronic navigation, electronic counter-measures, data-linking for improved information awareness, and automation to lighten pilot workload and keep the pilot focused on tasks essential to combat. This was a compelling argument, as the greatest factor in the effectiveness of a fighter plane has always been the pilot. Quoting a prominent reference, "Throughout the history of air combat, a few outstanding fighter pilots, typically less than five percent of the whole, have run up large scores at the expense of their less gifted brethren. The numerical imbalance was such that a large number of high scorers was needed. The quest was on to turn each fighter pilot into an ace, and technology seemed the easiest, and the only way to achieve it. This was the idea underlying the first two American superfighters; the F-14 Tomcat and the F-15 Eagle.”

While the technology advantage for heavy fighters that better supported the pilot may well have been a valid point in the 1970s (when the F-14 and F-15 first entered service), this advantage has not been maintained over time. Engine performance improvements have improved load carry capability, (Note: The engine thrust to engine weight of jet engines has much improved over time. The General Electric J47 of 1950s weighed 2,554 lbs and had thrust to weight of 2.34. The General Electric J79 turbojet of the 1960s weighed 3,850 lbs and had thrust to weight ratio of 4.63. The modern General Electric F414-400 turbofan weighs 2,445 lbs but delivers thrust to weight of 9.0. These huge improvements allow for considerably heavier avionics and weapons loads on more recent light fighters.) and with more compact electronics, the lightweight fighter has, from the 1980s onwards, had similar pilot enhancing technical features. The lightweight fighter carries equally effective weapons including BVR missiles, and has similar combat range and persistence. The modern lightweight fighter achieves these competitive features while still maintaining the classic advantages of better surprise, numbers, and maneuverability. Thus, the lightweight fighter natural advantages have remained in force despite the addition of more technology to air combat.

Due to their lower costs, modern light fighters equip the air forces of many smaller nations. However, as budgets have limits for all nations, the optimum selection of fighter aircraft weight, complexity, and cost is an important strategic issue even for wealthy nations. The budgetary and strategic significance of light fighters is illustrated by the defense investment at stake. As an example where well referenced data is available, though numerous trial and combat references consider the lightweight F-16 to be as good or better on a per plane as the excellent but expensive F-15, fielding and maintaining a light fighter force based on the F-16 is approximately half the cost of the same number of F-15's. The US Air Force reports the total loaded cost per hour (as of 2013) of operating the F-16C to be ~US$22,500 per hour, while that of the heavy F-15C is $41,900 per hour. Numerous authoritative sources report that it takes about 200 to 400 flight hours per year to maintain fighter pilot proficiency. (Note: The US Air National Guard reports via http://www.globalsecurity.org/military/systems/aircraft/f-16-life.htm that it needs 247 hours per year for minimum necessary proficiency of its F-16C pilots, with an average sortie duration of 1.2 hours. Sprey p. 64 reports 30 sorties per month or nearly 400 hours per year for high combat proficiency. Manes reports 231 to 321 flight hours per year of logged flight time for various USAF and Air National Guard units.)

Lanchester's laws on military superiority suggest that any technical superiority of the heavy fighter on a unit basis will not always translate to winning wars. For example, late in WWII the greatly superior German Messerschmitt Me 262 jet fighter, flown by the finest pilots Germany had left, many of them very high scoring aces with kill counts far in excess of Allied pilots, in its relatively small numbers suffered heavy losses and was unable to fundamentally alter the air war over Germany. Such issues are relevant to future military planning and deployments.

== History ==
=== Interwar period ===
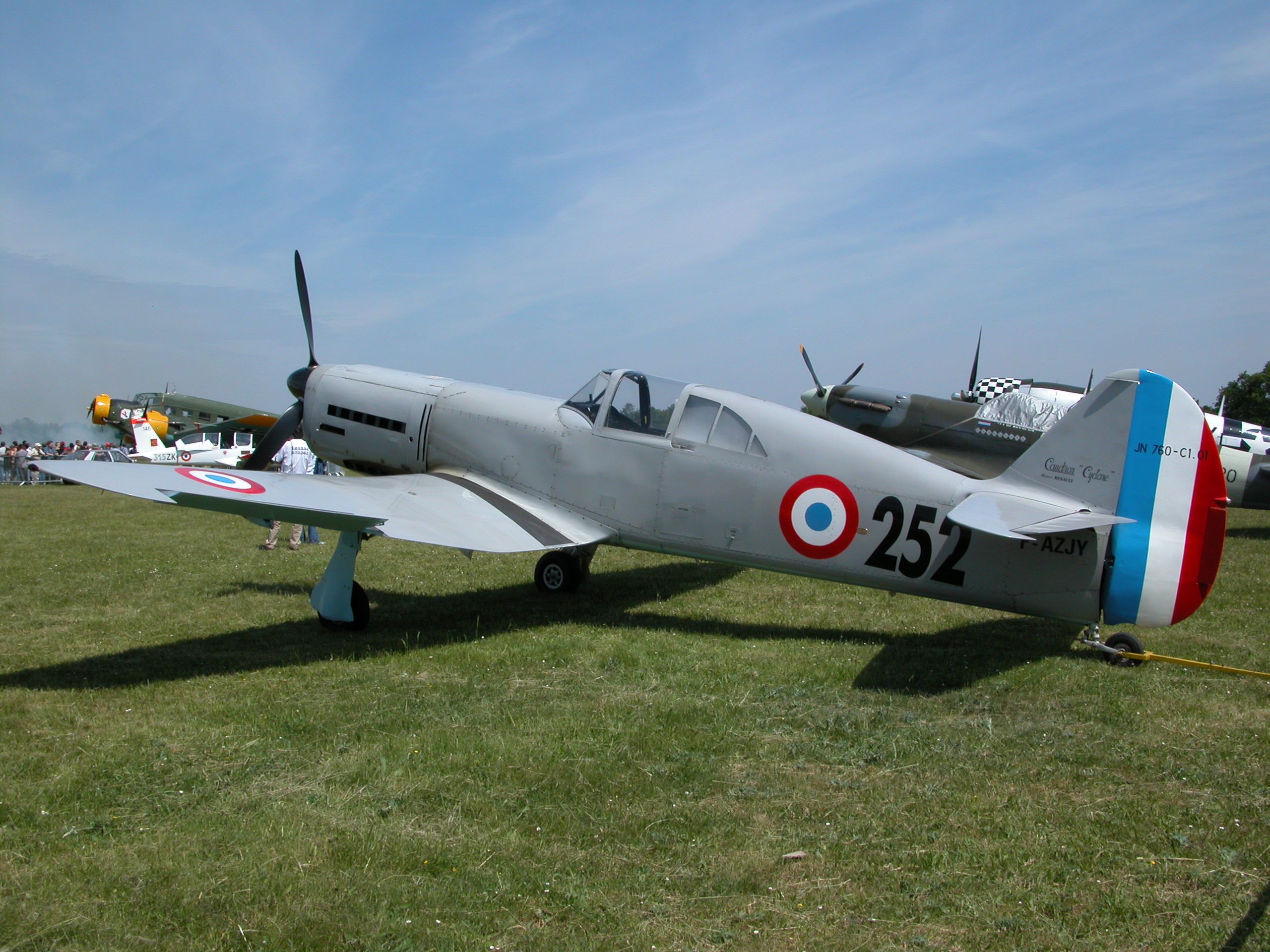
A replica of the Caudron C.714 at the La Ferté-Alais Air Show, 2004

The light fighter class originally stemmed from concern at the growing size and cost of the frontline fighters in the 1920s. During the late 1920s and 1930s the light fighter would receive significant attention, especially in France.

One early light fighter project was the French Air Force's 'Jockey' interceptor program of 1926. Several aircraft, including the Nieuport-Delage NiD 48 and Amiot 110, were trialed without much success as they offered little over aircraft already in production In the late 1920s the British similarly issued specification F.20/27 for a short-range fast-climbing daylight interceptor. The de Havilland DH.77 and Vickers Jockey monoplanes were among seven designs tendered to meet the specification but neither went into production, the heavier but faster biplane Hawker Fury being preferred.

Despite the failure of their Jockey program, the French returned to lightweight fighters during the 1930s as a means to expand France's fleet of aircraft and counter the buildup of the German air force. This focused on light wooden fighters that could be built quickly without affecting production of other aircraft. A mid-thirties specification requiring fixed undercarriage produced two prototypes and in 1936 a revised requirement for retractable gear resulted in three prototypes. The most numerous of the two designs which went into production was the Caudron C.714. Delivery began in early 1940, but less than 100 had been built before the fall of France. Although underpowered, it was of necessity used by Polish air force pilots serving in France.

=== WWII ===
There was debate before and during World War II about the optimum size, weight and number of engines for fighter aircraft. During the war, fighters in the light to middle-weight range proved to be the most effective. Properly designed with competitive power to weight and thrust to drag ratios, these aircraft out-performed heavy fighters in combat due to greater surprise and maneuverability. They were also more cost effective, allowing greater numbers to be deployed as a combat advantage. Some single-engined fighters (including the P-51 Mustang and A6M Zero) could also match or beat the range of their heavy twin-engined counterparts. (Note: The ranges of the P-51 and Zero vs. the better long range heavy fighters, with weapons loaded, is as follows: 1. P-38: 1300 miles. 2. Me 410: 1400 miles. 3. P-51: 1650 miles. 4. A6M Zero: 2010 miles.)

==== Germany ====
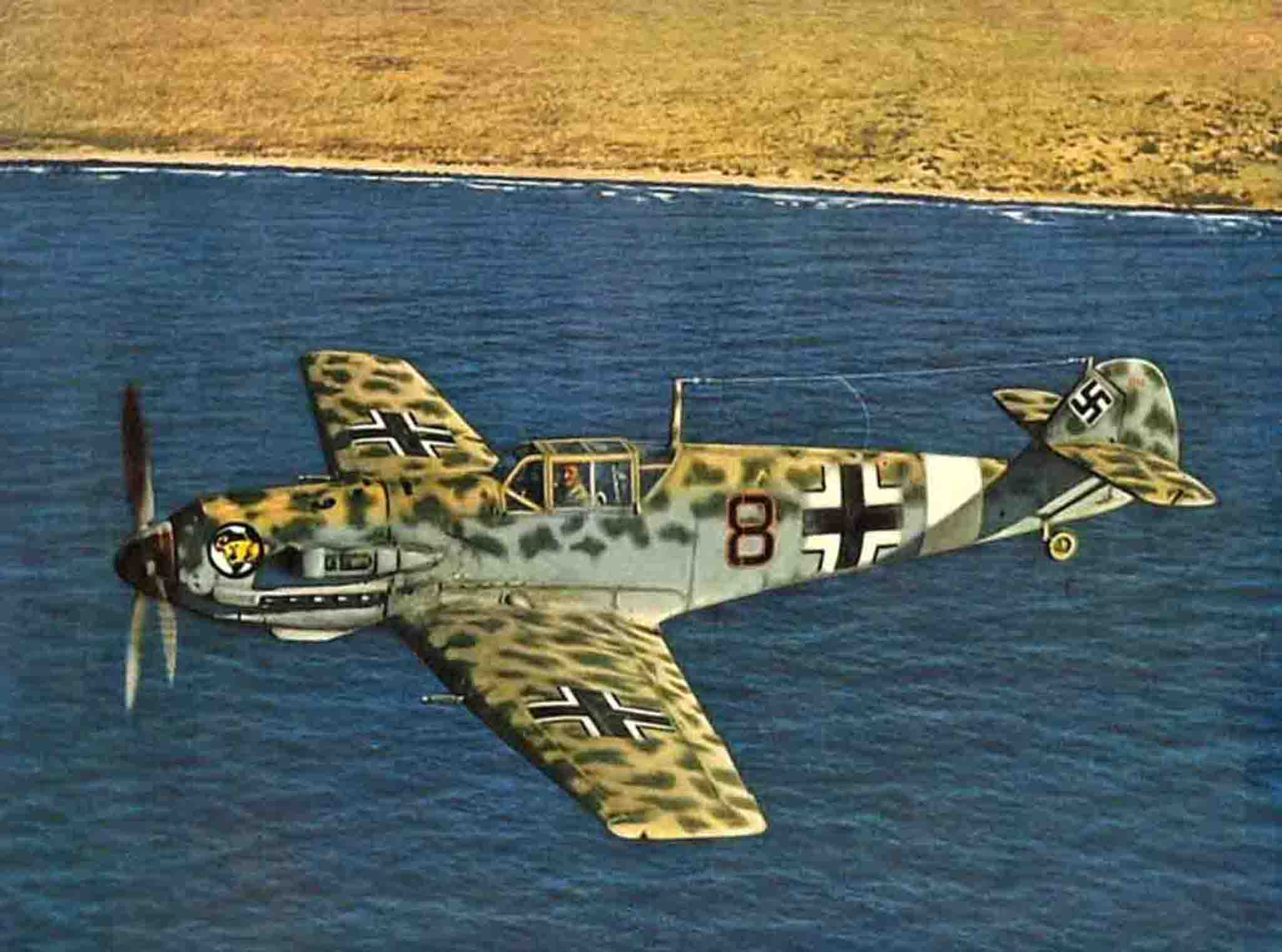
The German Bf 109 was the second smallest major fighter of WWII, and produced in greater numbers than any fighter in history.

The German Messerschmitt Bf 109 entered service in 1937 as a high speed interceptor and became the most-produced fighter in history, with nearly 34,000 built. The design philosophy of the Bf 109 was to wrap a small airframe around a powerful engine using Messerschmitt's "lightweight construction" principle, which aimed to minimize the weight and number of separate parts in the aircraft. By concentrating wing, engine and landing gear weight in the firewall, the structure of the Bf 109 could be made relatively light and simple. The Bf 109 was the second-smallest major fighter aircraft of World War II and the lightest in the European theater. The "E" version used in the Battle of Britain had an empty weight of 2,010 kg (4,430 lb). The more heavily armed and powerful G version used later in the war had an empty weight of 2,700 kg (6,000 lb). In comparison, its main fighter opponents weighed 2,100 to 5,800 kg (4,600 to 12,800 lb).

==== Japan ====
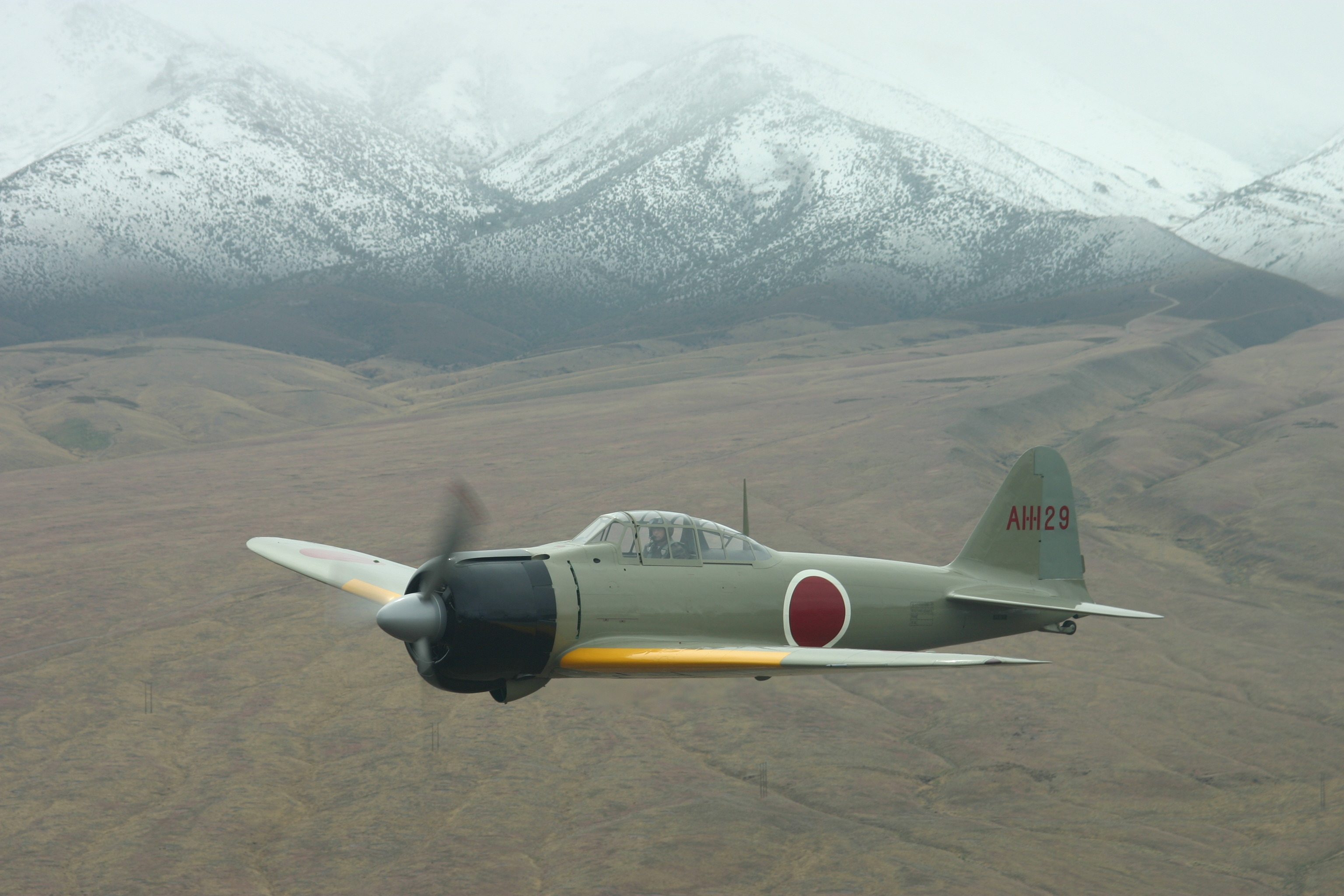
The Japanese A6M2 Zero was the lightest major fighter of WWII. Extremely maneuverable and long range, it was highly successful early in the war, though surpassed in the later stages.

The lightest major fighter of World War II was the Japanese Mitsubishi A6M Zero naval fighter. Entering service in 1940 and remaining in use throughout the war, it had an empty weight of 1,680 kg (3,700 lb) for the A6M2 version, which was extremely light even by the standards of its time. The design team leader, Jiro Horikoshi, intended it to be as light and agile as possible, embodying the qualities of a samurai sword. With Japanese engine technology lagging behind that of the west, but required to out-perform western fighters, the designers minimised weight to maximize range and maneuverability. This was achieved by methods including the use of light weaponry and the absence of armour and self-sealing fuel tanks. Early in World War II the Zero was considered the most capable carrier-based fighter in the world, and the extremely long range meant that the Zero could appear in and strike locations where Japanese air power was otherwise not expected to reach. In early combat operations, the Zero gained a reputation as an excellent dogfighter, achieving a kill ratio of 12 to 1. However, Japan was unable to keep improving the aircraft through the war, primarily limited by lagging engine technology, and by mid-1942 a combination of new tactics and the introduction of better aircraft enabled the Allied pilots to engage the Zero on equal or superior terms. For instance, the larger and heavier Grumman F6F Hellcat had superior performance to the Zero in all aspects other than manoeuvrability. Combined with the US Navy's superior training standards, units equipped with the type achieved a large victory-to-loss ratio against the Zero and other Japanese aircraft.

==== United Kingdom ====
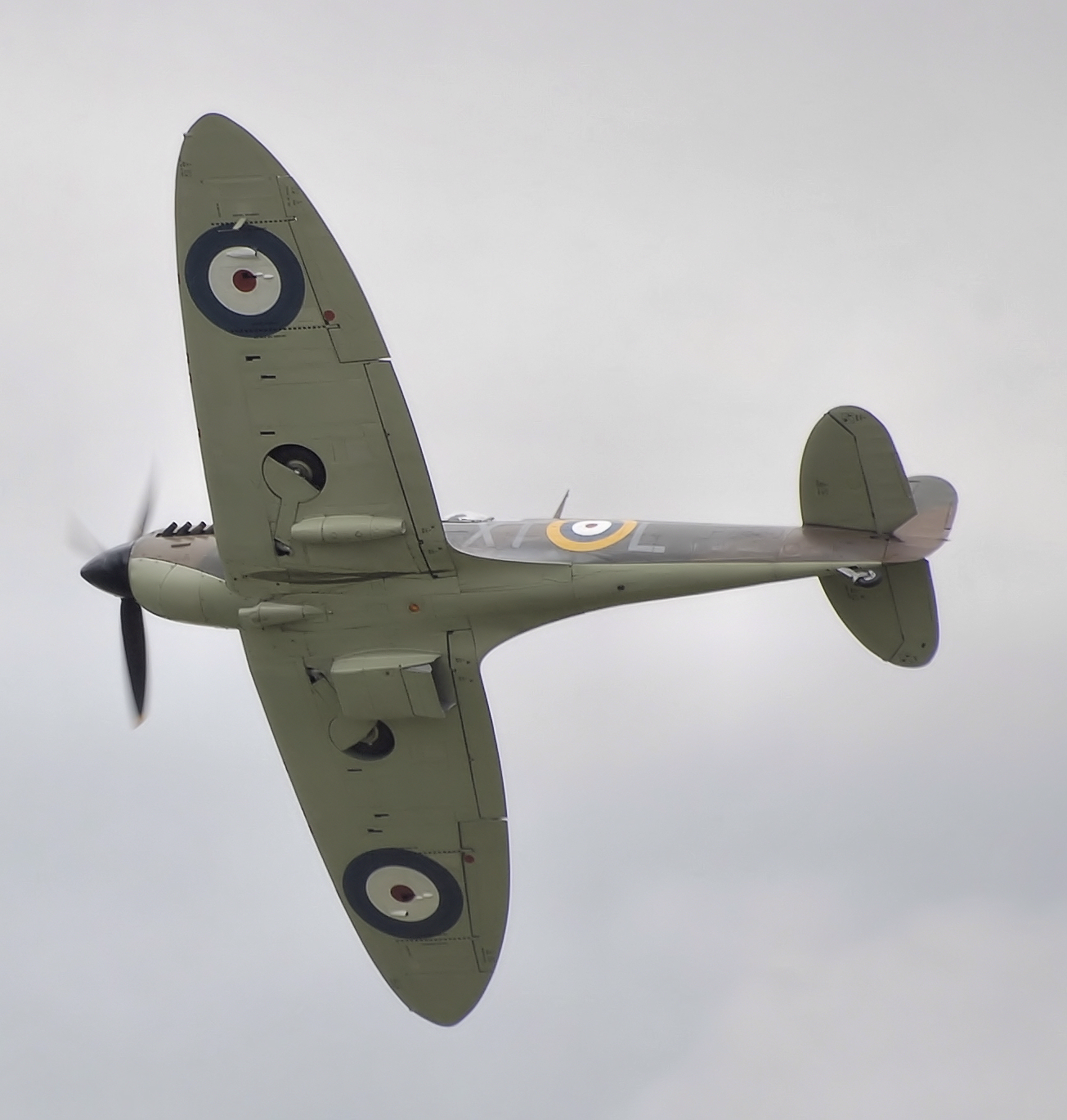
The British Spitfire was only slightly larger than the Bf 109, and an effective match for it during the Battle of Britain.

The Royal Air Force entered World War II with two modern single-engined fighters forming the majority of the fighter force of the RAF – the Supermarine Spitfire and the Hawker Hurricane. Initially introduced as bomber interceptors, both started with eight machine gun armament but changed to cannons in the course of the war.

The Spitfire, designed by R. J. Mitchell, entered service in 1938 and remained in production throughout the war. The empty weight of the Battle of Britain-era Spitfire IIA was 2,142 kg (4,722 lb), increasing to 2,984 kg (6,579 lb) in a later variant. It was highly maneuverable and was generally a match for its German opponents. Most Spitfires had a Rolls-Royce Merlin engine, but later variants used one of the most powerful engines of the war – the Rolls-Royce Griffon. The Spitfire was produced and improved throughout the war but was complex to build and had limited range. In other respects it was considered an outstanding fighter.

The Hawker Hurricane played an important role in the Battle of Britain, but its performance was inferior to the Spitfire and during the war was removed from frontline duty as a fighter and used for ground attack. Production ceased in mid-1944. The Hurricane IIC weighed 2,605 kg (5,743 lb) empty.

==== United States ====
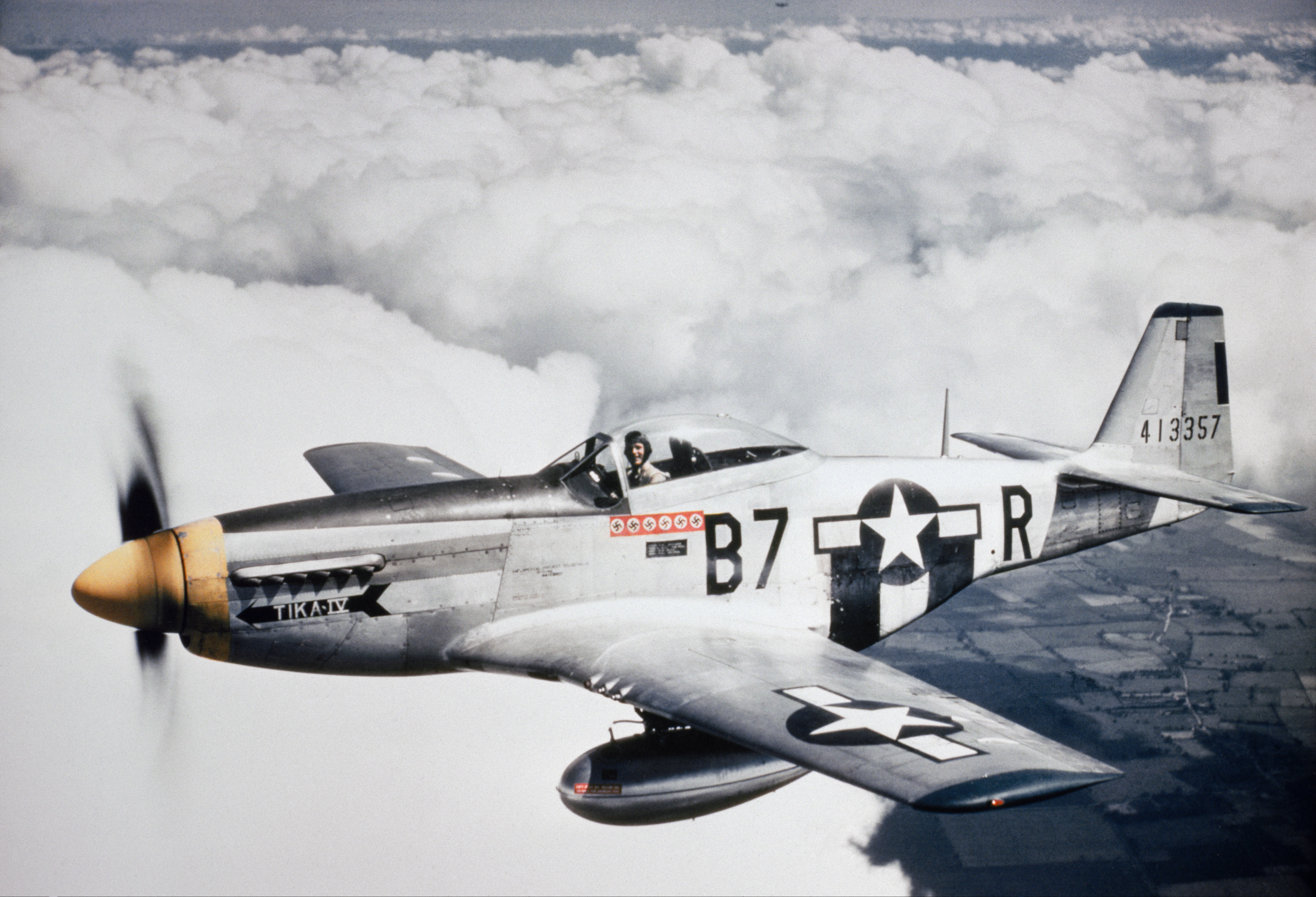
The P-51 is widely considered to be the finest piston fighter of WWII. With drop tanks as shown here, the relatively light P-51 could perform long range bomber escort.

On the eve of the war, the United States Army Air Corps contracted for several "very light" fighter designs based on the Ranger V-770 engine, an air-cooled inverted V12 engine, that delivered up to 700 hp. Two prototypes were the Bell XP-77 (empty weight 2,855 lb (1,295 kg)) and the Douglas XP-48 (empty weight 2,655 lb (1,204 kg)). Problems with the engine and performance and a perceived lack of need saw both programs canceled. However, they were specifically defined as "light" or "very light" fighter aircraft.

Instead, the US developed a number of standard pursuit fighters, the most efficient being the relatively lightweight North American P-51 Mustang. The P-51 was more economical, costing less per air-to-air kill than any other American aircraft.

The United States Navy, also made aware of lightweight advantages by combat results, ordered a lighter version of the Grumman F6F Hellcat, which at 9,238 lb (4,190 kg) empty weight had limited maneuverability and rate of climb. The planned Grumman F8F Bearcat replacement used the same engine, but with empty weight reduced to 7,070 lb (3,210 kg) had excellent performance. It entered production too late to see combat in World War II. Postwar, it equipped 24 fighter squadrons in the Navy and a smaller number in the Marines. Navy author James Perry Stevenson called the Bearcat "the quintessential lightweight fighter".

==== USSR ====
The Soviet Yakovlev Yak-3, which entered service in 1944, was an attempt to develop the smallest and lightest fighter around the 1,600 hp (1,200 kW) V-12 Klimov M-107 engine. As this engine was not available in time, the 1,300 hp (970 kW) Klimov M-105 was substituted, with a resulting empty weight of 2,100 kg (4,600 lb). Despite the reduced power, the Yak-3 had a top speed of 655 km/h (407 mph). The Yak-3 could out-turn the German Bf 109 and Fw 190. German pilots were ordered to avoid dogfights with the Yak-3 at low level.

The Soviet Yakovlev Yak-9 was also a lightweight fighter, initially using the M-105 engine. With an empty weight 2,350 kg (5,180 lb), it was among the lighter major fighters of World War II. A development of the Yakovlev Yak-7, it entered combat in late 1942 and was the Soviet Union's most-produced fighter with 16,769 built. At low altitudes, the Yak-9 was faster and more maneuverable than the Bf 109. However, its armament of one cannon and one machine gun was relatively light.

=== Early jet age ===
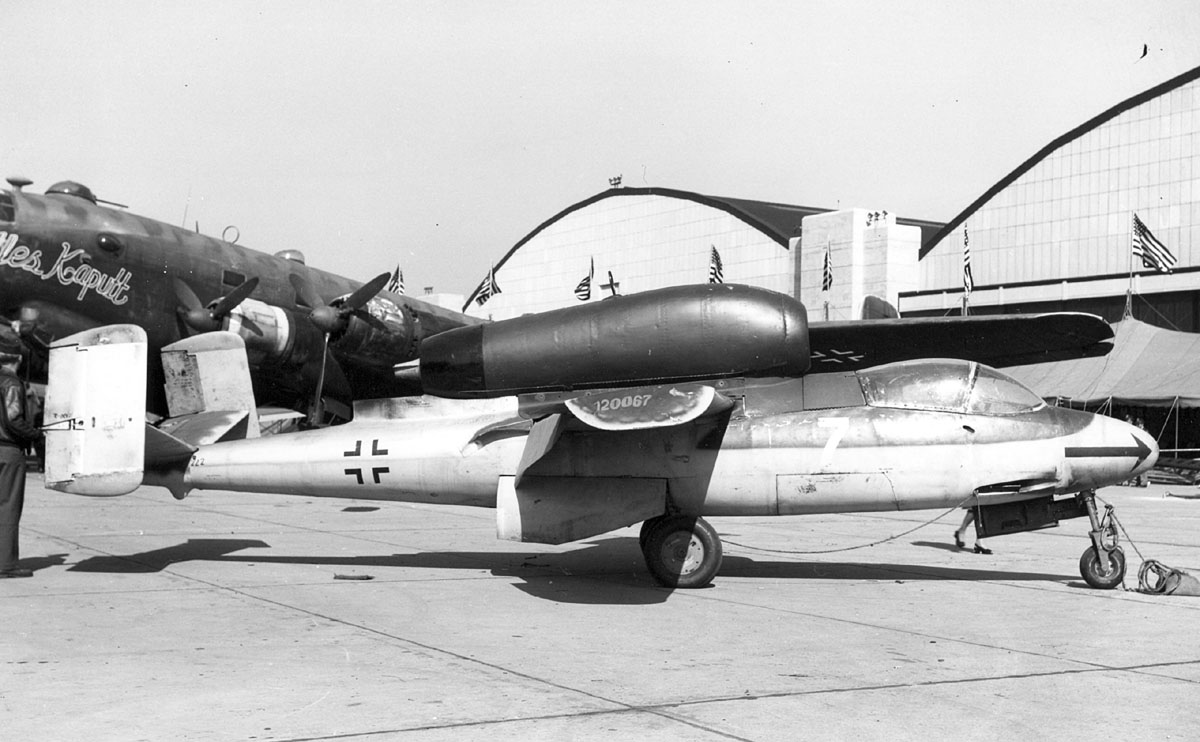
The first jet light fighter in service was the German Heinkel He 162 of 1945.

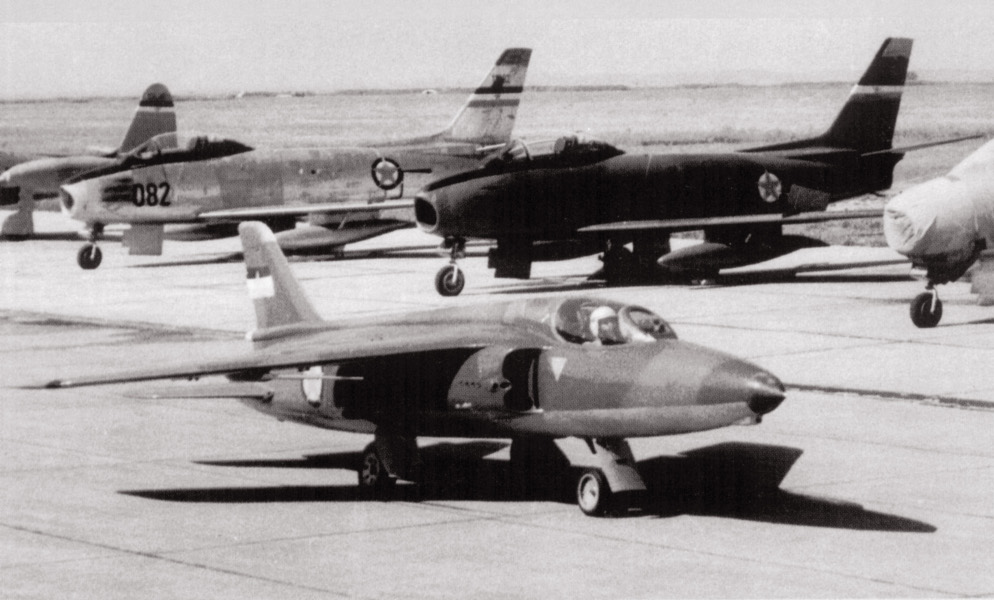
UK's Folland Gnat showing its size relative to the North American F-86 Sabres in the background, which it dominated in several conflicts.

The Luftwaffe's Heinkel He 162 Volksjäger of 1945 was a very deliberate attempt at producing a low cost jet fighter without materials that were in short supply at the end of the war. It was a low cost emergency fighter, one of several designs for the Emergency Fighter Program using rockets or jets, which could be built by unskilled labour and would be flown by inexperienced pilots to defend the Third Reich. With an empty weight of 1,660 kg (3,660 lb), it was very light even for the time. The He 162A was powered by a BMW 003 engine. With a top speed of 790 km/h (490 mph) at normal thrust at sea level, and 840 km/h (520 mph) at 6,000 m (20,000 ft), it was about 130 km/h (81 mph) faster than Allied fighters but had no more than 30 minutes fuel. Test pilots reported it to be a fine handling and conceptually well designed aircraft, and considered its problems to be rushed delivery more than any fundamental design flaws. It never formally entered operational service, and did not receive the benefit of being flown by well trained pilots using a well considered operational plan. Only 120 were delivered to units, and it scored only a few kills in experimental use before the war ended.

After World War II fighter design moved into the jet era, and many jet fighters followed the successful World War II formula of highly efficient mostly single-engine designs. Prominent early examples include the British mid-50s Folland Gnat, the American North American F-86 Sabre, Northrop F-5 and the Soviet Mikoyan MiG-15.

The Mikoyan-Gurevich MiG-15 was a Soviet jet fighter developed shortly after World War II. It weighed 3,630 kg (8,000 lb) empty and was one of the first successful jet fighters to use swept wings for high transonic speeds. It first saw service in the Chinese Civil War. In combat during the Korean War, it outclassed straight-winged jet day fighters. Some 18,000 were produced.

The North American F-86 Sabre, a transonic jet fighter manufactured from 1949, was the United States's first swept wing fighter. With an empty weight of 5,000 kg (11,000 lb) it was nearly 40 per cent heavier than the MiG-15, but light compared with today's fighters. The F-86 had a bubble canopy, small size, moderate cost, high maneuverability, and an armament of six .50 in (13 mm) calibre machine guns. It could turn faster than any modern fighter. It saw combat against the Mig 15 in high-speed dogfights during the Korean War. Considered (with the MiG 15) as one of the best fighters in the Korean War, it was the most-produced Western jet fighter, with total production of 9,860 units. It continued as a front-line fighter in numerous air forces until 1994.

The Folland Gnat was a British private venture design for a light fighter and was the product of "Teddy" Petter's theories about fighter aircraft design. Although only adopted by the UK as a trainer, (Note: The trainer was a two-seater with larger wing. It was the first aircraft of the Red Arrows display team.) the Gnat served successfully as a fighter for the Indian Air Force and was in service from 1959 to 1979. India produced an improved derivative of it, the HAL Ajeet. With an empty weight of 2,177 kg (4,799 lb) it was the lightest (Note: It is only about half of the weight of other successful light jet fighters such as the F-5.) successful post-World War II jet fighter, though at the cost of shorter range compared to other fighters. The Gnat is credited as having shot down seven Pakistani F-86s in the 1965 war, for the loss of two Gnats downed by PAF fighters. During the Indo-Pakistani War of 1971, Indian Gnats shot down several Pakistani F-86s without loss. The Gnat was successful against the capable F-86 flown by well-trained Pakistani pilots because its smaller size allowed a superior level of surprise and greater agility in dogfighting.

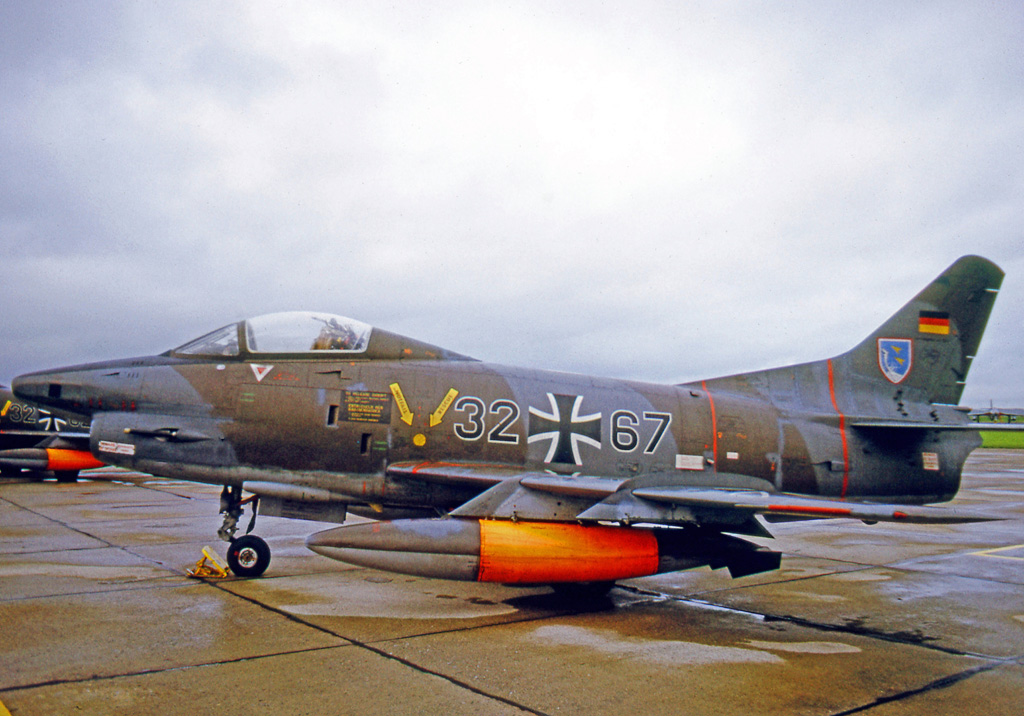
A Luftwaffe Fiat G.91

In the early 1950s, the NATO NBMR-1 competition for a cheap "light weight tactical strike fighter" able to carry conventional or tactical nuclear weapons and operate from dispersed airfields with minimum ground support led to designs including the French SNCASE Baroudeur, Breguet Taon and Dassault Étendard VI, the Italian Aeritalia G.91 and Aerfer Ariete. Other competitors included the Northrop F-5A. The British chose to continue production of the Hawker Hunter, while the French decided to work independently of the competition. Italy produced the Fiat G.91 while the competition was underway and, in 1957, this was selected as NATO's standard strike fighter. With an empty weight of 3,100 kg (6,800 lb) it was very light for a jet fighter. The G.91 entered service with the Italian Air Force in 1961, with the West German Luftwaffe, in 1962, and later with the Portuguese Air Force. It was in production for 19 years, with production ceasing in 1977 with 756 aircraft built.

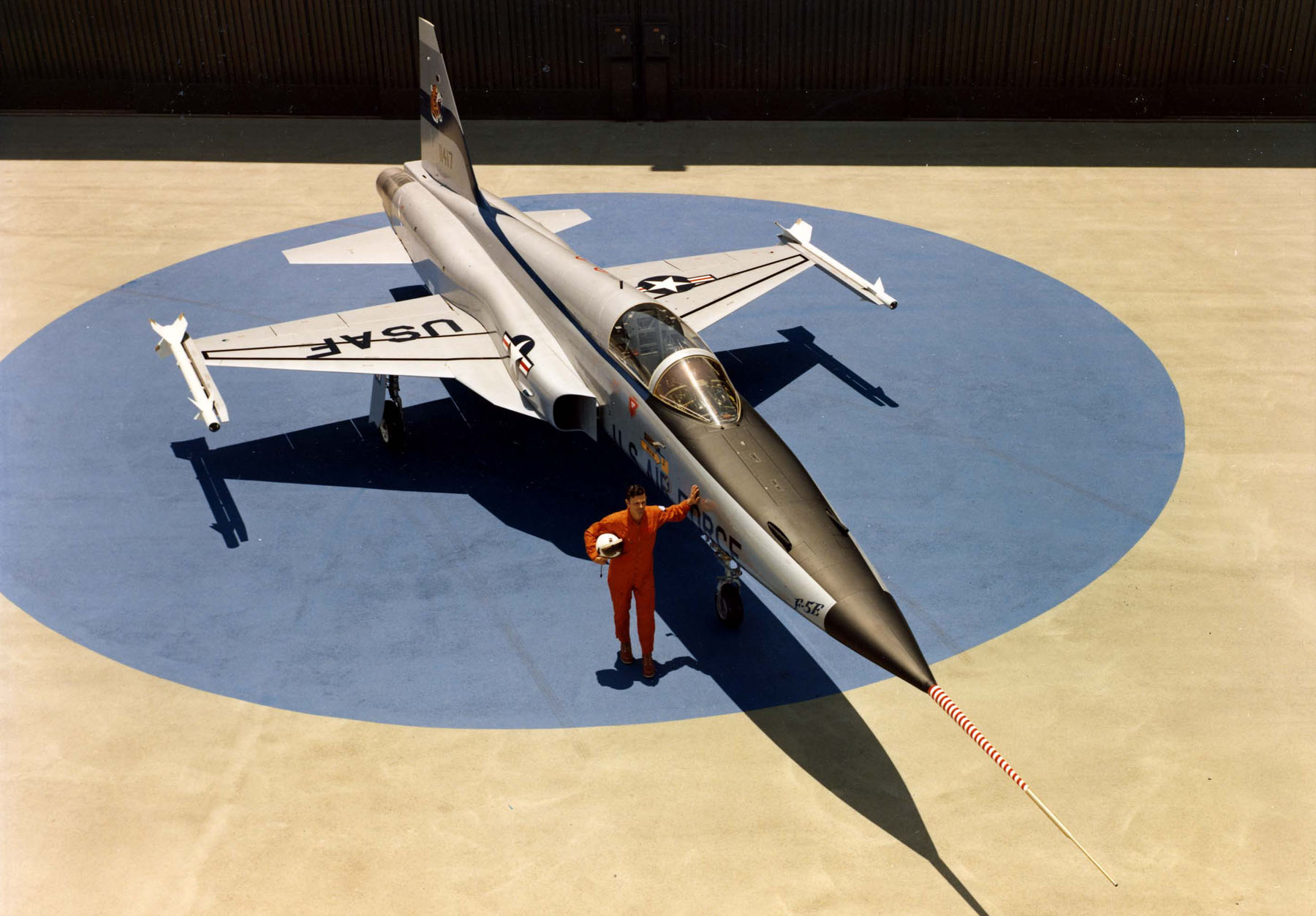
Official roll-out of the United States Air Force's first Northrop F-5E Tiger II.

In the mid-1950s, it was realized that fighter costs were escalating to possibly unacceptable levels, and some companies sought to reverse the trend to heavier and more expensive fighters. A prominent result was the Mach 1.3 to Mach 1.6, 4,335 kg (9,557 lb) Northrop F-5. Smaller, cheaper and simpler than the contemporary F-4 Phantom, the F-5 had excellent performance and was popular on the export market. It was perhaps the most effective US-produced fighter in the 1960s and early 1970s, with a high sortie rate, low accident rate, high maneuverability, and an effective armament of 20mm cannon and heat-seeking missiles. Though the United States never procured the F-5 for main line service, it did adopt it as an opposing forces (OPFOR) "aggressor" for dissimilar training role because of its small size and similarity in performance to the Soviet MiG-21. It also participated in large scale trials of aircraft and missile effectiveness. In the extensive 9 month long AIMVAL/ACEVAL trial at Nellis AFB in 1977, the F-5 "Red Force" was quite effective against the considerably larger F-14 Tomcat naval fighter and F-15 Eagle single seat fighters making up the "Blue Force". These modern aircraft are approximately five to ten times more expensive than the various versions of the F-5. The final result was the F-5 fighting the more modern fighters to an effective plane for plane draw. In direct combat against the similar MiG-21 (which performed well against American fighters in Vietnam), the F-5 is known to have scored 13 victories against 4 losses. Just under 1000 of the F-5A Freedom Fighter were sold worldwide, and another 1,400 of the updated F-5E Tiger II version. As of 2016 the F-5 remains in service with many nations, some of which have undertaken extensive upgrade programs to modernize its abilities with digital avionics and radar guided missiles.

The light middleweight Saab 35 Draken was a second to third generation Mach 2 fighter produced from 1955 to 1974 and in service for 45 years, with empty weights from 6,577 kg (14,500) to 7,440 kg (16,400 lb). It was a double-delta wing single-engine fighter. Its steeply swept inner delta wing allowed for a high cruise speed. The double-delta, with a shallower rake at the outer wing, improved maneuverability. It was designed to be cheap enough for small countries and simple enough to be maintained by conscripted mechanics. Its high acceleration, light wing loading, and extreme maneuverability enabled it to be an excellent dogfighter. However, it had an overly complex fire control system. It remained in service until 2005.

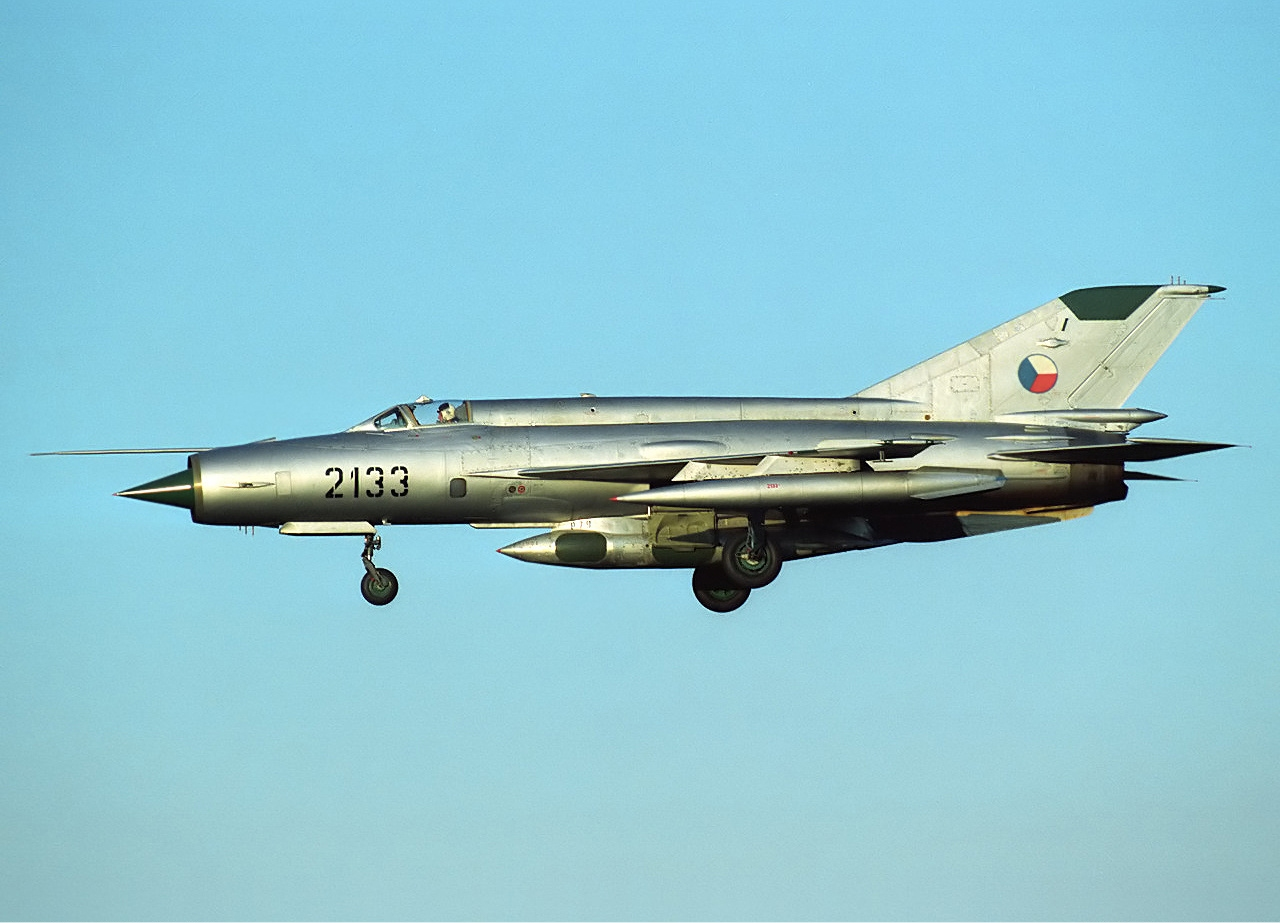
The lightweight, supersonic MiG-21 proved a dangerous opponent to heavier American fighters in the Vietnam War.

The French Dassault Mirage III is another late 2nd/early 3rd generation delta wing Mach 2 fighter. Stemming from a French requirement for a lightweight all-weather interceptor, it has been in service since 1961. With an empty weight of 7,076 kg (15,600 lb) in the "E" version with added ground attack capability, the Mirage III is a light fighter by modern standards (though twice as heavy as initial Mirage I). Its maneuverability, modest cost, reliability and armament of 30mm cannons and heat seeking missiles proved effective. It served the French Air Force and was exported to many countries. It performed very well for Israel in the Six-Day War of 1967 and Yom Kippur War of 1973. However, Argentina's Mirage IIIs were out-performed by British Sea Harriers during the Falklands War of 1982.

Similar in size to the F-5, the Soviet Mikoyan-Gurevich MiG-21 entered service in 1959, was produced until 1985, and is still in widespread use today. The late Generation 2 to Generation 3, Mach 2 MiG-21 has an empty weight of 4,535 kg (9,998 lb), and has served nearly 60 nations. It shot down 37 to 104 US Phantoms, in the Vietnam War, with the Phantoms shooting down 54 to 66 MiG-21s in return. In December 1966 the MiG-21 pilots of the 921st FR downed 14 F-105s without any losses. Its weaknesses include poor visibility and relatively short range, but has otherwise proven to be a capable fighter.

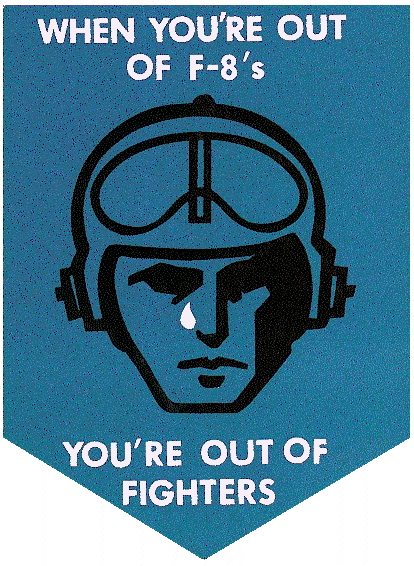
F-8 pilots insignia

The US's Vought F-8 Crusader used in Vietnam weighed 8,000 kg (18,000 lb), as compared with 13,750 kg (30,310 lb) for an F-4 Phantom. It was a simple, supersonic, single engine, gun- and heat-seeker armed fighter in front-line service from 1957 to 1976. It had no radar except a simple ranging gunsite radar. The US claims the Crusader (up to 1968) shot down six enemy aircraft for every loss, compared with 2.4 for every Phantom lost. The three F-8s shot down in air-to-air (Note: A total of 170 F-8s were lost in the Vietnam War, about half from ground fire and half from accidents. Ref: Hobson, Chris. Vietnam Air Losses, USAF, USN, USMC, Fixed-Wing Aircraft Losses In Southeast Asia 1961–1973, pp. 269–271. Specialty Press, 2001. ISBN 1-85780-115-6, Crusader In Action) were all lost to MiG-17 cannon fire.

The first few decades of the jet fighter era showed a combat history similar in general trend to that of the propeller fighters of World War II. So long as lighter fighters are of sufficient power-to-weight ratio and airframe sophistication, and flown by similarly skilled pilots, they tend to dominate over heavier fighters using surprise, numbers, and maneuverability. However, one significant difference did emerge in design strategy in the early jet fighter era. In World War II fighter design was strongly influenced by the seeking of higher speeds that were valuable in combat in order to close with the enemy or to escape. This trend was instinctively continued in some jet fighters through the 3rd generation (F-4 at Mach 2.23) and into the 4th generation (F-14 at Mach 2.35 and F-15 at Mach 2.5+). The aerodynamic requirements to operate at such speeds add considerable complexity, weight, and cost to the airframe. But, these Mach 2 and above class speeds have zero utility in combat. Combat speeds never exceed Mach 1.7 and seldom 1.2, for two reasons. First, it requires extensive use of the afterburner, which typically increases fuel consumption by about a factor of three or even four, and rapidly reduces operational radius. Second, speeds even above about Mach 0.7 to Mach 1 (depending on circumstances) so widen the turn radius in maneuvering combat that the fighter is thrown too wide to get a tracking solution on an opponent. Speed had reached the limit of its practical combat value, such that optimum fighter design required understanding the penalties the endless search for higher speed was imposing, and sometimes deliberately choosing not to accept those penalties.

=== Supersonic era ===
As supersonic performance, with afterburning engines and modern missile armament, became the norm the Soviet Mikoyan MiG-21, the French Mirage III, and the Swedish Saab Draken entered service. The next generation of lightweight fighters included the American F-16 Fighting Falcon, Swedish JAS 39 Gripen, Indian HAL Tejas, Korean FA-50, Japanese Mitsubishi F-2, Chinese Chengdu J-10 and Pakistani CAC/PAC JF-17 Thunder. The high practical and budgetary effectiveness of modern light fighters for many missions is why the US Air Force adopted both the F-15 Eagle and F-16 in a "hi/lo" strategy of both an outstanding but expensive heavy fighter and a lower cost but also outstanding lightweight fighter. The investment to maintain a competitive modern lightweight fighter air force is approximately $90M to $130M (2013 dollars) per plane over a 20-year service life, which is approximately half the cost of heavy fighters so understanding fighter aircraft design trade-offs and combat effectiveness is of national level strategic importance.

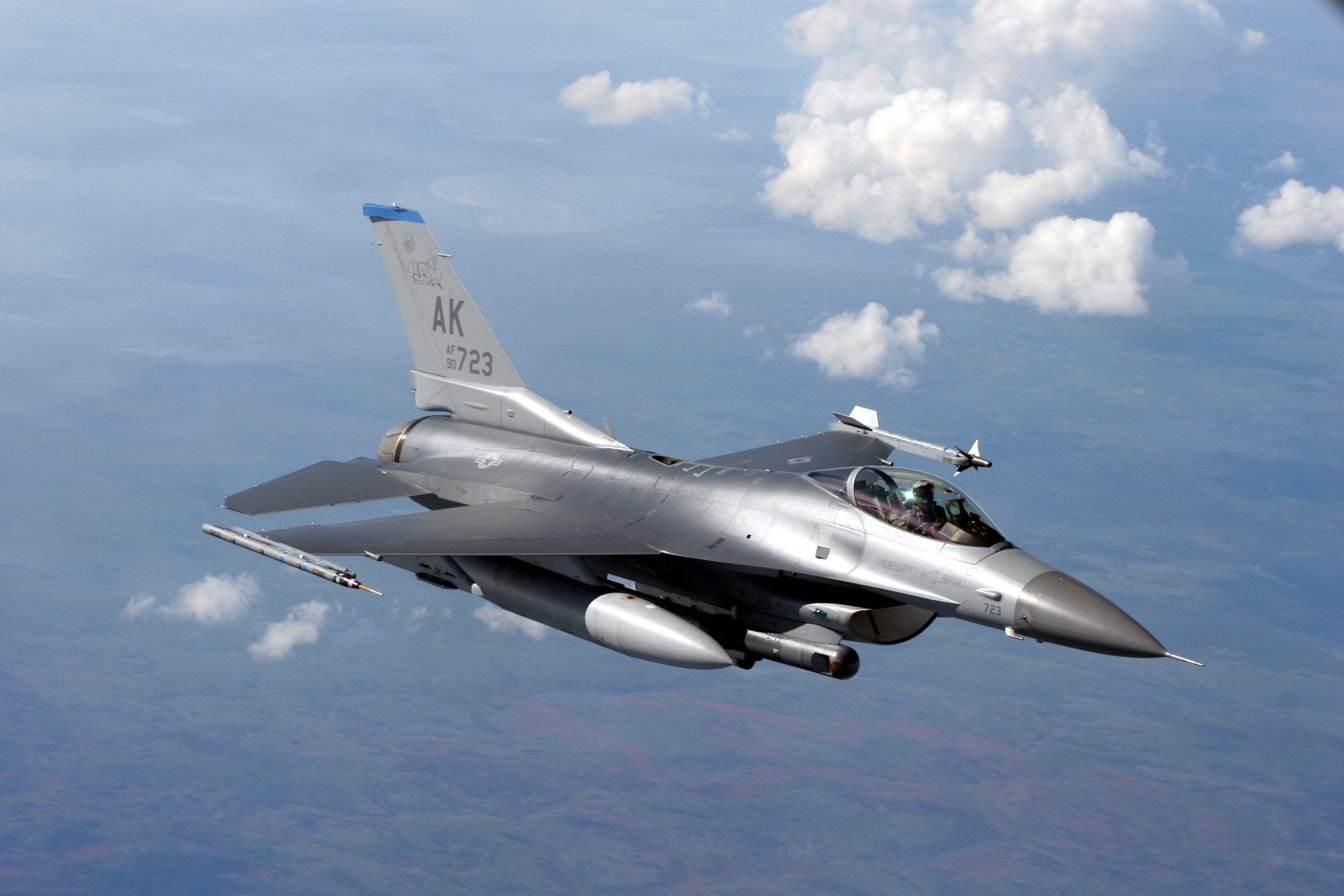
The General Dynamics/Lockheed F-16 is the archetype of the modern, advanced light jet fighter, and is in service with many nations.

In the 1960s and 1970s, a US-based "Fighter Mafia", led by colonels John Boyd, Everest "Rich" Riccione and analyst Pierre Sprey advocated for production of a 4th generation light fighter. Despite heavy fighter losses in the Vietnam War, most senior US Air Force leaders still opposed the light fighter concept. After much debate, General Dynamics designed the successful F-16. Its competitor, the Northrop YF-17, led to the successful McDonnell Douglas F/A-18 Hornet Navy fighter as a cheaper alternative to the F-14. The F-16 offered excellent air-to-air combat performance due partly to its fly-by-wire control system, which improved agility. When not burdened by heavy air-to-ground weapons, the F-16 had the longest range of any US fighter at the time. The F-16 and F/A-18 later added significant weight to become multirole fighters with strong air-to-ground capabilities, pushing them towards the "middleweight" range of modern fighters.

The Soviet counterpart to the F-16 and F/A-18, the Mikoyan MiG-29, was originally part of the Perspektivnyy Lyogkiy Frontovoy Istrebitel (LPFI, or "Advanced Lightweight Tactical Fighter") program.

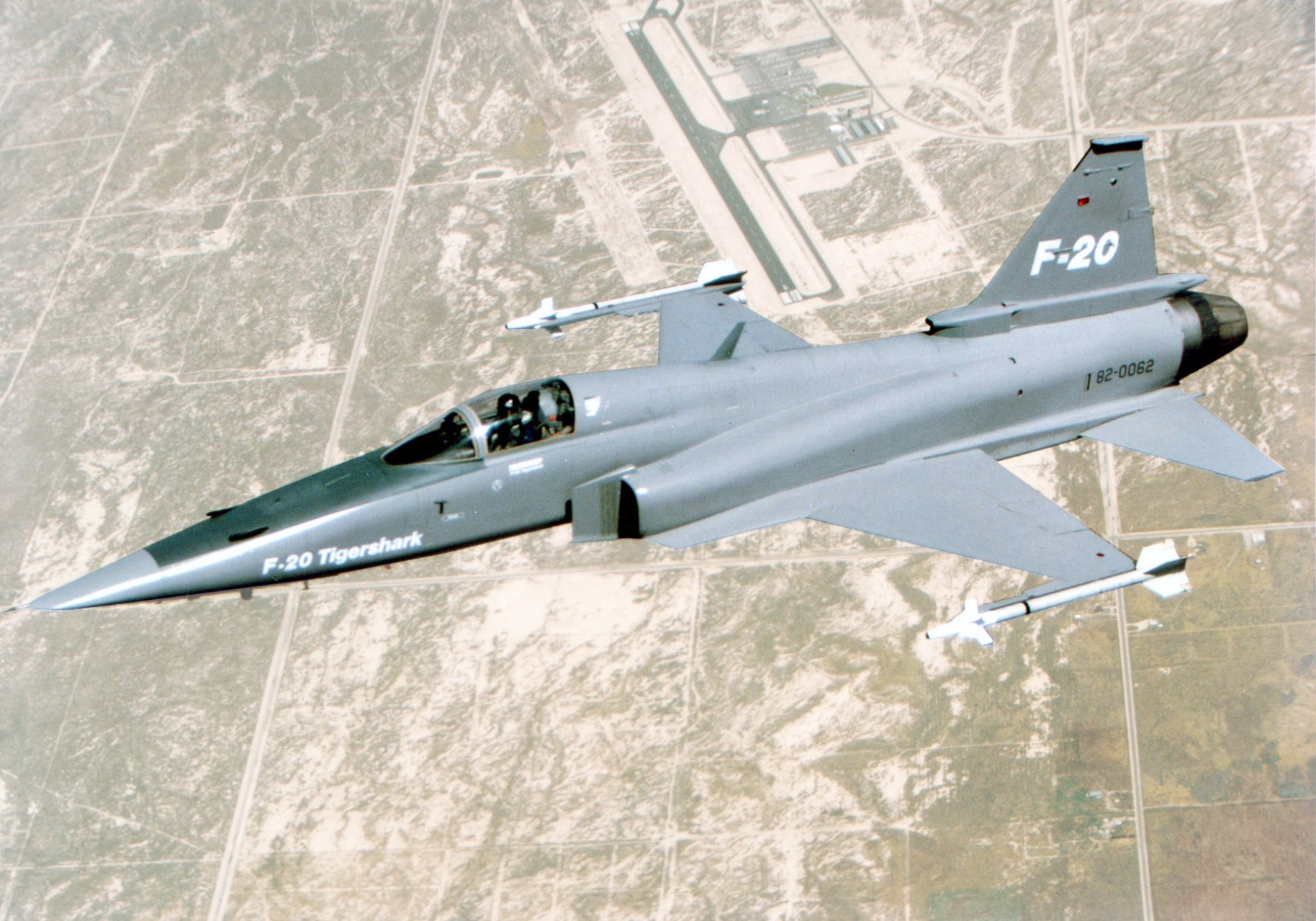
The Northrop F-20 Tigershark was an update of the F-5 intended for the export market, but lost out to the F-16 and never entered production.

In the 1980s the privately developed F-5G, later renamed the Northrop F-20 Tigershark, aimed to correct weaknesses in the aging F-5 while maintaining small size and low cost. Its empty weight was 6,000 kg (13,000 lb). Its General Electric F404 engine produced 60 percent more power than the F-5, and it had a higher climb rate and acceleration, better cockpit visibility, and more modern radar. Chuck Yeager, test pilot and the first man to break the sound barrier, referred to the F-20 as "the finest fighter" of the mid-1980s. Despite its high performance and cost effectiveness, the F-20 lost out for foreign sales against the similarly capable, more expensive F-16, which was being procured in large numbers by the US Air Force and was viewed as having greater support. The Tigershark was cancelled having made no sales.

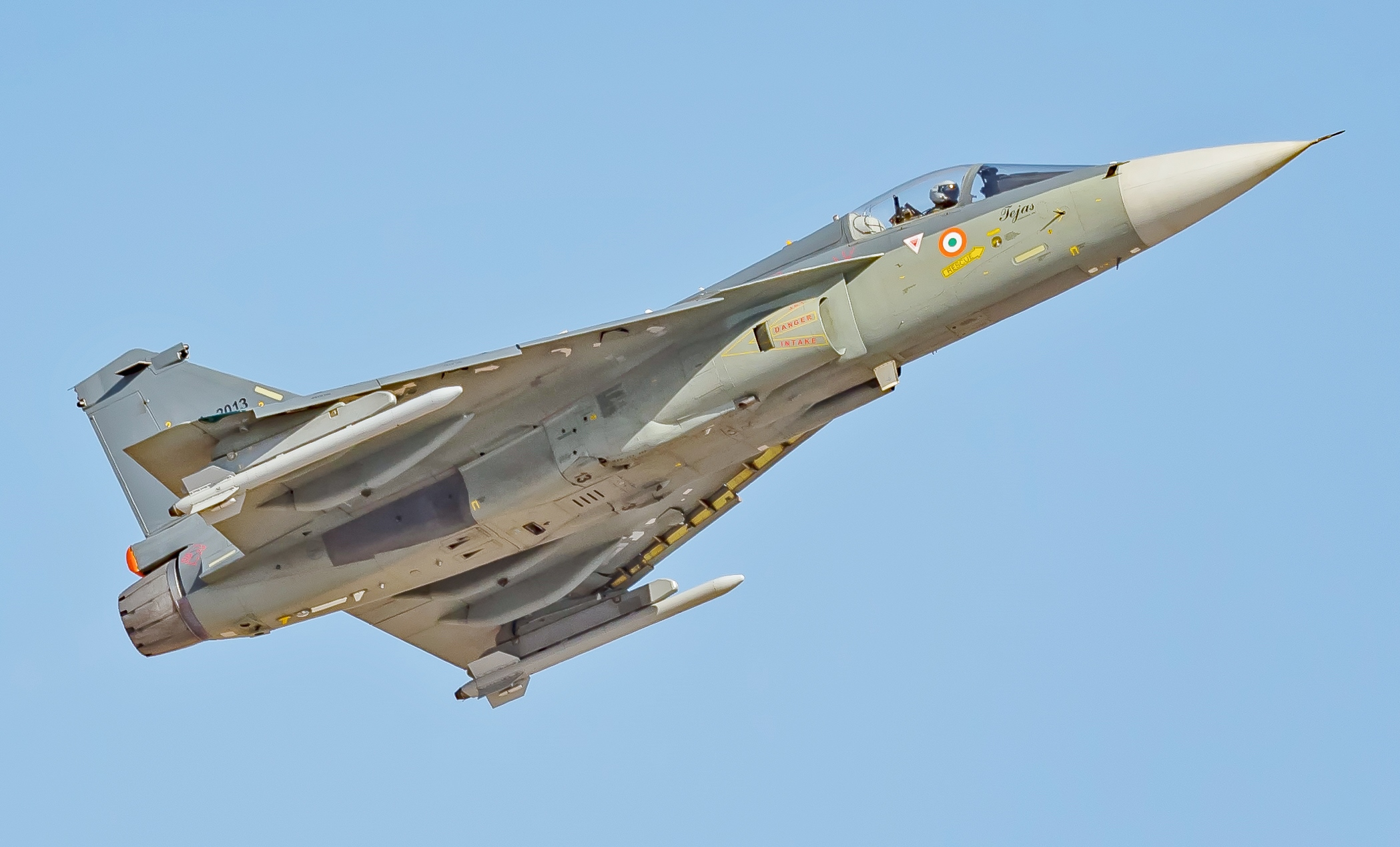
HAL Tejas

The HAL Tejas has an empty weight of 6,500 kg (14,300 lb), and is the lightest fighter among current production light fighters. Introduced into limited service in 2014, with 16 IOC specification aircraft delivered to January 2020, it was the lowest-cost fighter aircraft with competitive air-to-air capability in production at that time, at an equivalent cost of US$27 million. 83 Tejas MK1As are ordered, with another 100 planned, making it the lightest 4.5 generation aircraft in production. The design is similar to the Mirage III and JAS 39 Gripen, being a light tailless delta-wing single-engine fighter with ground attack capability.

The French Dassault Mirage 2000 was designed for the French Air Force (Armée de l'Air) in the late 1970s, as a lightweight single-engine fighter. Based on the Mirage III, it entered service in 1982, and has since evolved into a multirole aircraft. In heavier multirole form, it has empty weight of 7,400 kg (16,300 lb). More than 600 were built and it has served in the air forces of ten nations.

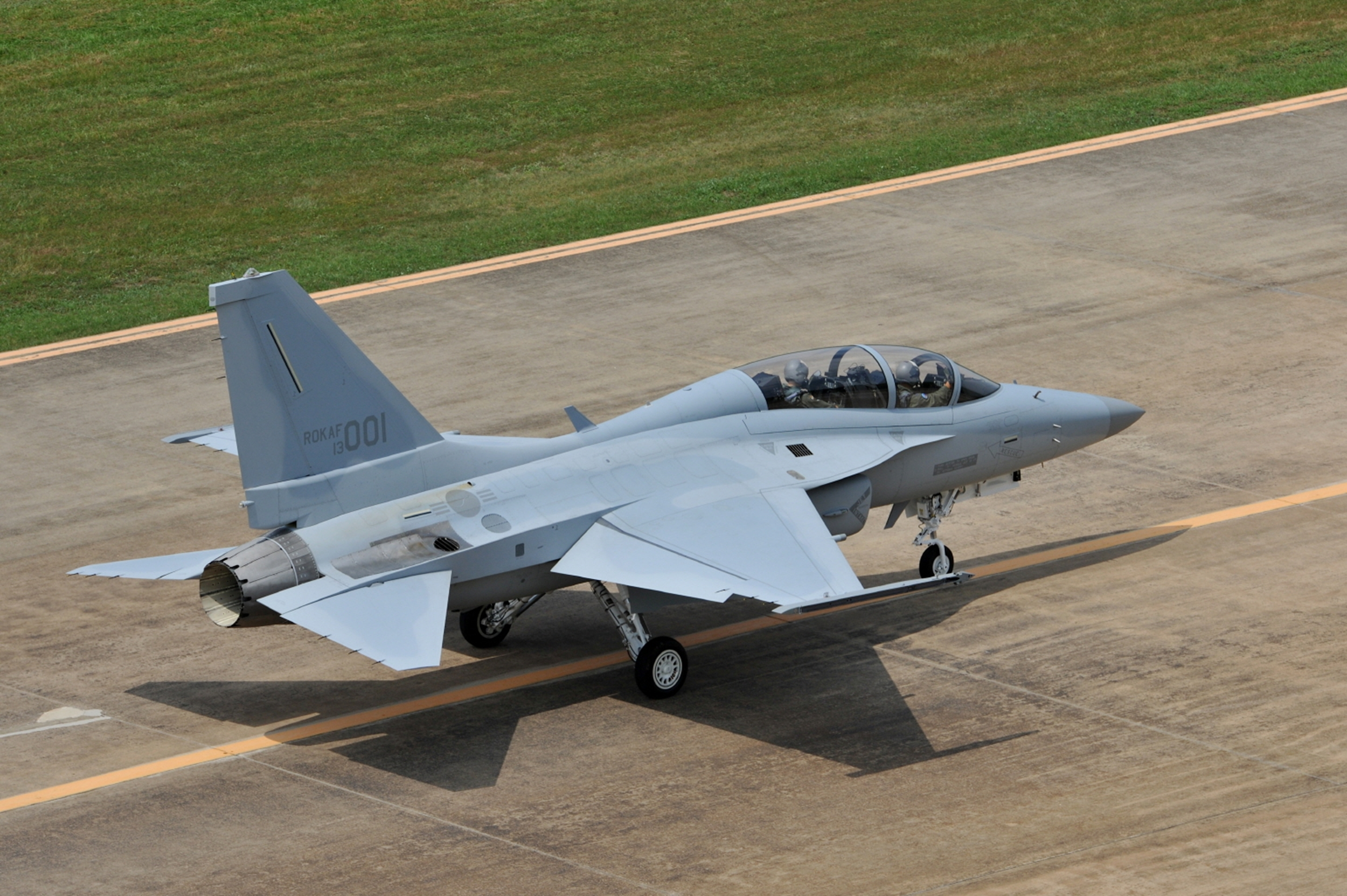
KAI FA-50

South Korea's KAI T-50 Golden Eagle, designed by Lockheed Martin with Korea Aerospace Industries, is based on the F-16 multirole-fighter. Its latest variant, the FA-50 Fighting Eagle, is designated as a light fighter and trainer. It uses the same air frame as the T-50 advanced trainer introduced in August 2002. It is now deployed with South Korean Air Force and the Philippine Air Force.

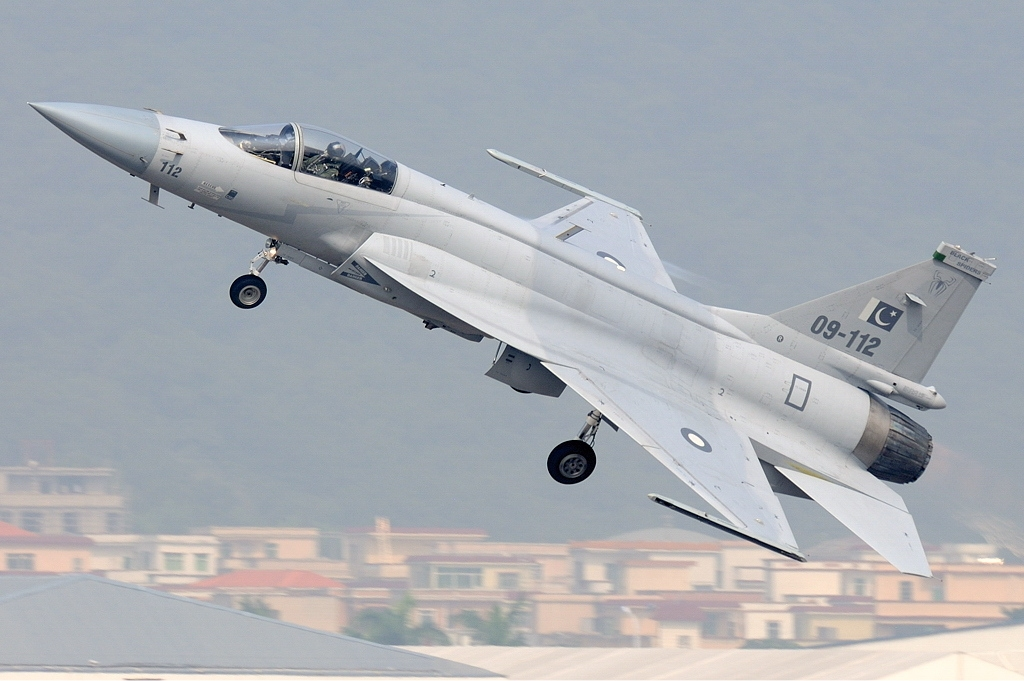
CAC/PAC JF-17 Thunder

The CAC/PAC JF-17 Thunder light fighter was developed jointly by China's Chengdu Aircraft Corporation and Pakistan's Pakistan Aeronautical Complex in the early 2000s. it was inducted into the Pakistan Air Force in February 2010. At least 66 aircraft have been delivered to Pakistan. More aircraft are scheduled to be introduced in 2018. A twin-seater variant was undergoing flight testing as of late 2015.

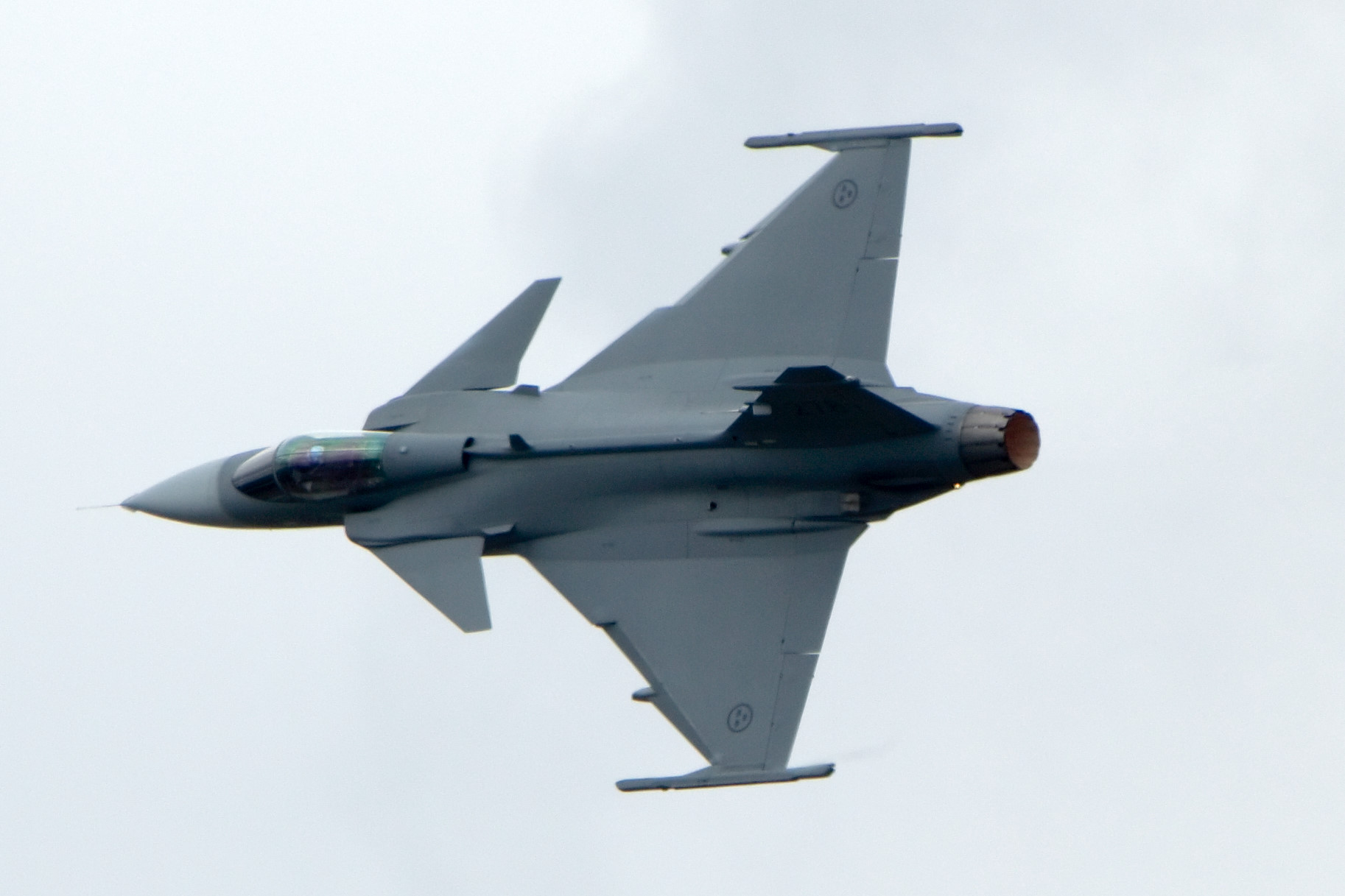
The versatile Gripen is the second lightest jet fighter currently in production, and features advanced canard-delta aerodynamics.

The JAS 39 Gripen is a single-engine light fighter manufactured by the Swedish aerospace company Saab. With an empty weight of 6,800 kg (15,000 lb) it is the second lightest fighter in production as of 2016. Though primarily an air superiority fighter, the design has effective air-to- ground capability as well. Its delta wing offers high cruise and super-cruise (above Mach 1 without using after-burner), low wing-loading and high maneuverability. It can operate from short airstrips and 800 m (870 yd) sections of road, can be serviced by moderately trained mechanics, and has high sortie rates. Among Western 4th generation fighters the Gripen has the lowest operating cost at about $4,700 per flight hour (as of 2012). The lowest operating cost in current range of fighters discussed above is of HAL Tejas of about $4,000. Among western fighters, next best operating cost fighter is the F-16 at about $7,000 per flight hour. (Note: This Jane's reference is only considering per hour cost of fuel, airfield level maintenance, and personnel. It is not considering original development costs, per unit purchase costs, and major upgrade programs. When all costs are considered and amortized, the total per flight hour costs will approximately triple. For example, total F-16C cost is reported $22,500 per hour by the USAF as of 2013, instead of the $7000 per hour reported by Jane's in their study. See https://nation.time.com/2013/04/02/costly-flight-hours/ for fully loaded hourly operating cost of USAF aircraft as reported by the USAF.) The Gripen has relaxed stability fly-by-wire flight controls for maximum agility, a top speed of Mach 2, a 27mm cannon, heat-seeking missiles, and radar-guided missiles.

== Current trends ==
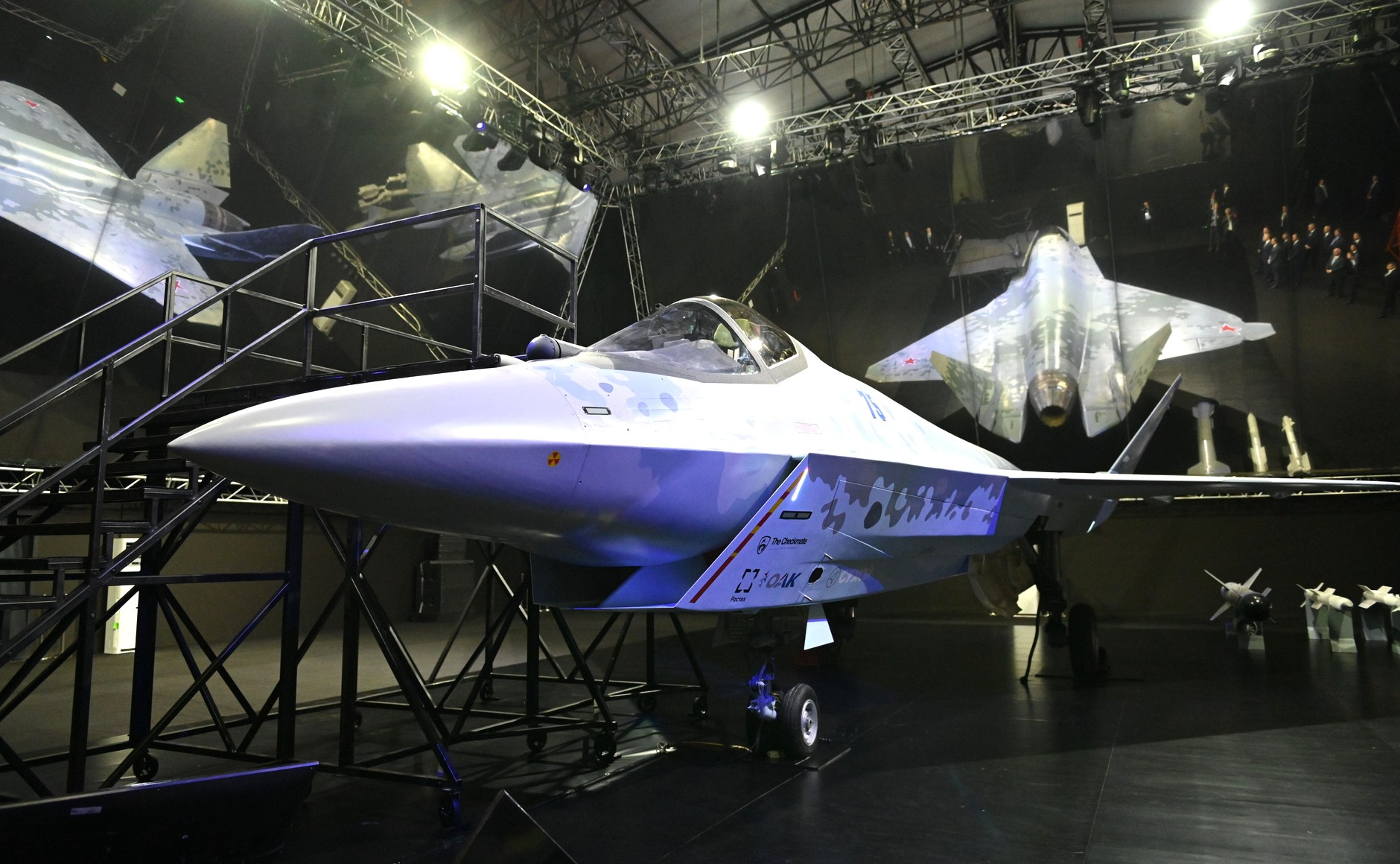
The Sukhoi Su-75 Checkmate is a Russian proposal for a 5th-generation, single-engine, stealthy combat aircraft.

The issue of where a fighter is best positioned on the weight, cost, and complexity curve is still a contentious issue. Stealth technology (airframe and engine design that strongly reduce radar and heat signatures) seeks to emphasize the most important feature of fighter effectiveness, the element of surprise. So far it has been featured only on heavier and more expensive fighters, specifically the F-22 Raptor and F-35 Lightning II. These fighters are not only stealthy, but also have information or combat awareness advantages due to active electronically scanned array (AESA) radars, and data linking for external cuing of enemy position and friendly force status. Their combination of near invisibility to conventional radars, superior combat awareness, networking, and reliable Beyond Visual Range (BVR) missiles, enables them to get deep inside the enemy's OODA loop and destroy enemy fighters before their pilots are even aware of the threat.

Fighter drones (see Unmanned combat aerial vehicle) are under development, driven by the same tactical and cost effectiveness principles of light fighters. Their perceived advantages include not only cost and numbers, but the fact that their software based "pilot" does not require years of training, is always at the same peak effectiveness for each aircraft (unlike the human pilot case where the top 5% of pilots have historically scored about 50% of all kills), is not physiologically limited, and does not have a life to lose if the aircraft is lost in combat. Though there is cultural resistance to replacement of human fighter pilots and also concerns about entrusting life and death decisions to robot software, such fighter drones are expected to eventually be implemented.

== Bibliography ==
- Ahlgren, Jan; Linner, Anders; Wigert, Lars (2002), Gripen, the First Fourth Generation Fighter, Swedish Air Force and Saab Aerospace, ISBN 91-972803-8-0
- Burton, James (1993), The Pentagon Wars: Reformers Challenge the Old Guard, Naval Institute Press, ISBN 978-1-61251-369-0
- Coram, Robert (2002), Boyd: the Fighter Pilot Who Changed the Art of War, Little, Brown, and Company, ISBN 0-316-88146-5
- Cross, Roy; Scarborough, Gerald; in collaboration with Ebert, Hans (1976), Messerschmitt Bf 109, Versions B-E, Classic Aircraft, Their History and How to Model Them, Patrick Stevens, ISBN 0-85059-106-6
- Cross, Roy (1962), The Fighter Aircraft Pocket Book, Jarrold and Sons, Ltd.
- Green, William; Swanborough, Gordon (1994). The Complete Book of Fighters. Godalming, UK: Salamander Books. ISBN 1-85833-777-1.
- Gunston, Bill; Spick, Mike (1983), Modern Air Combat, Crescent Books, ISBN 91-972803-8-0
- Hammond, Grant T. (2001), The Mind of War: John Boyd and American Security, Smithsonian Institution Press, ISBN 1-56098-941-6
- Huenecke, Klaus (1987), Modern Combat Aircraft Design, Airlife Publishing Limited, ISBN 0-517-412659
- Lee, John (1942), Fighter Facts and Fallacies, William Morrow and Company
- Ludwig, Paul (2003), Development of the P-51 Mustang Long-Range Escort Fighter, Classic Publications, ISBN 1-903223-14-8
- Shaw, Robert (1985), Fighter Combat: Tactics and Maneuvering, Naval Institute Press, ISBN 0-87021-059-9
- Singer, P.W. (2009), Wired for War: The Robotics Revolution and Conflict in the Twenty-first Century, Penguin Publishing Group, ISBN 978-1-440-68597-2
- Spick, Mike (1995), Designed for the Kill: The Jet Fighter—Development and Experience, Airlife, ISBN 1-85310-121-4
- Spick, Mike (2000), Brassey's Modern Fighters, Pegasus Publishing Limited, ISBN 1-57488-247-3
- Sprey, Pierre (1982), "Comparing the Effectiveness of Air-to-Air Fighters: F-86 to F-18" (PDF), U.S. DoD Contract MDA 903-81-C-0312, archived from the original (PDF) on 27 August 2021
- Stevenson, James (1993), The Pentagon Paradox: The Development of the F-18 Hornet, Naval Institute Press, ISBN 1-55750-775-9
- Stimson, George (1983), Introduction to Airborne Radar, Hughes Aircraft Company
- Stuart, William (1978), Northrop F-5 Case Study in Aircraft Design, Northrop Corp.
- Thomson, Steve (2008), Air Combat Manoeuvres: The Technique and History of Air Fighting for Flight Simulation, Ian Allan Publishing, ISBN 978-1-903223-98-7
- Wagner, Raymond (2000), Mustang Designer: Edgar Schmued and the P-51, Washington, DC: Smithsonian Institution Press
