= William Humble =

William Humble may refer to:

- William Humble (cricketer) (1846–1924), English cricketer
- Sir William Humble, 1st Baronet (1612–1686), English merchant and financier
- Bill Humble (1911–1992), British aviator
