= Trevor Sidney Wade =

RAF fighter & test pilot (1920-1951)

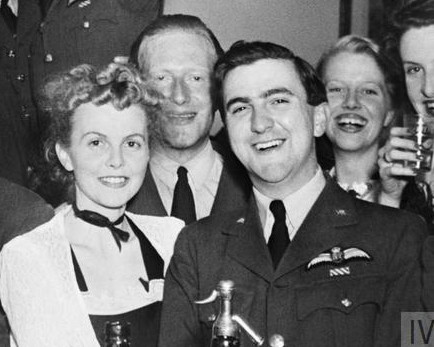
- (Right to left) Pilot Officer Trevor Wade, Flight Lieutenant Robert Holland, Mrs Josephine Wade. September 1941 Biggin Hill
- Born: 27 January 1920; Wandsworth, London
- Died: 3 April 1951 (aged 31); Ringmer, Sussex
- Military career
- Allegiance: United Kingdom
- Branch: Royal Air Force
- Rank: Squadron Leader
- Nickname: Wimpy
- Service number: 78984
- Conflicts: Second World War: Battle of Britain
- Awards: Distinguished Flying Cross; Air Force Cross
- Other work: Test pilot

Sqn Ldr Trevor Sidney "Wimpy" Wade, DFC, AFC (27 January 1920 – 3 April 1951) was a Royal Air Force (RAF) fighter ace, one of The Few and later a test pilot. He was killed test flying the Hawker P.1081 prototype fighter.

== Early life ==
Wade was born on 27 January 1920 in Wandsworth, London. He was educated at Yardley Court and Tonbridge School. In April 1938, aged 18, he joined the Royal Air Force Volunteer Reserve as an Airman u/t (under training) and learned to fly at No. 19 Elementary and Reserve Flying Training School, Gatwick. He was called to full-time service at the outbreak of war and was commissioned as a Pilot Officer (on probation) on 30 April 1940.

== Fighter pilot ==
A month later Wade was posted to No. 92 Squadron, part of No. 11 Group RAF and then based at Croydon Airport. On his first day (26 May) he borrowed Tony Bartley's Spitfire to get more flying hours on type, performing a low level roll immediately after takeoff. His nickname "Wimpy" was borrowed from the American cartoon character of Popeye fame.

In June the squadron was moved to RAF Pembrey. On 28 July Wade was flying a night patrol over Swansea Bay. As his fuel ran low, with deteriorating visibility and a failed radio he elected to bail out over Exeter. On 19 August he was in action for the first time. He shared the destruction of a Ju 88 but was hit by return fire. As a result, he had to make a forced landing, managing to escape before his aircraft ignited.

Wade was engaged in more combat in September, claiming a half share in a Do 17 on 10 September, a He 111 on 11 September, a probable Bf 109E on 15 September, damage to Bf 109Es on 18 September and 20 September, with the destruction of a Do 17 on 22 September. . On 27 September he was hit by return fire and had to force land at Lewes, his aircraft flipping over.

Wade's luck held out during the final phase of the Battle of Britain. On 12 October he claimed one Bf 109E destroyed, one probable and one damaged. On 26 October he claimed one Bf 109 probable, on 29 October a Bf 110 probable and on 26 November a Do 17 probable. On 2 December Wade was engaged in combat, he claimed one Bf 109E but yet again was hit by return fire forcing him to land at Gravesend.

In June 1941 his combat tour was over and he was sent to join No. 123 Squadron at RAF Turnhouse, which at that time was assigned operational training duties.. While there, he received notification that he had been awarded a Distinguished Flying Cross for his efforts during the first part of the war and achieving seven confirmed victories. The citation, published in the London Gazette on 15 July 1941, read:

This officer has displayed great skill and determination in his numerous engagements against the enemy and has destroyed at least six of their aircraft. His efforts have contributed materially to the success achieved by the squadron.

In September 1941 he was posted as a flight commander to No. 602 Squadron for what would be a short tour, because during a raid on the Marquise Shell factory, on 17 September, he received a wound which ended his career as a combat pilot.

After he had recovered in October 1941, he was sent to the Central Flying School on an instructors course. Following this, he became a pilot-gunnery instructor; first at the Central Gunnery School; then at 9 Group's headquarters, responsible for gunnery instruction at fighter OTUs. He was promoted to Squadron Leader (temporary) on 30 October 1942 and in late 1943 he was made the Officer Commanding at the Air Fighting Development Unit (AFDU). For his service at the AFDU he was awarded the AFC in September 1944. Early in 1945 he was sent to USA to test captured Japanese aircraft and also to gain experience of early jets.

== Test pilot ==
Wade was demobilised in 1946 and joined the staff of The Aeroplane magazine, testing and reporting on new civil light aeroplanes. Within a year (October 1947) he had joined Hawker Aircraft as an assistant to the Chief Test Pilot Bill Humble. He was initially tasked with the production testing of Furies and Sea Furies, but also assisted with the development flying of the N.7/46 (P.1040). When Humble became a sales manager in June 1948, Wade became Chief Test Pilot and focussed on the development flying of the latest Hawker jets. In August 1948 Wade made the first public demonstration of the P.1040, flying it from Langley Airfield (Hawker's flight test centre). Later in that month he competed in the 1948 S.B.A.C. air race at Lympne, flying a Hawker Fury.

Hawker's first swept wing jet was the P.1052; Wade made the maiden flight of the first of the two prototypes (VX272) on 19 November 1948. On 13 May 1949, (Note: The same day as the first flight of the Canberra prototype.) he set up a new record for the London-Paris flight, flying 221 miles (356 km) in 21min 28s, an average speed of 618 miles per hour (995 km/h). In August 1949 he won the S.B.A.C. Challenge Cup race in the P.1040 (competing against John Cunningham in a D.H Vampire F3 and John Derry in the D.H.108). He averaged 510 miles per hour (820 km/h) over the course, with one lap at 584 miles per hour (940 km/h), thereby gaining the Geoffrey de Havilland Trophy for the fastest racing time of the year.

The rear fuselage of the second P.1052 prototype (VX279) was rebuilt to use a straight-through jet pipe and a swept tailplane. Thus modified it was re-designated as P.1081. On 19 June 1950 Wade flew the P.1081 on its maiden flight from RAE Farnborough. He was satisfied with its behaviour and put in approximately six hours flying over the following three days prior to flying it to the Antwerp international air display, successfully demonstrating it on 25 June. Testing VX279 was not without incident, during one test flight in 1950, a main wheel failed to lower but Wade managed to land the aircraft without serious consequences. Wade surpassed his performance at Antwerp at the S.B.A.C. Display in September 1950, when he demonstrated its high roll rate and speed in level flight.

In January 1951 Wade was the first of a group of British test pilots to go to the United States on an exchange scheme. There he gained experience of supersonic flight in the F86 Sabre. The prototype Hawker P.1081 was transferred from Hawkers to RAE Farnborough for high speed research. On 3 April 1951 Wade was testing it when the aircraft entered an unrecoverable flight regime. It has been suggested that he was attempting a transonic dive and had inadvertently gone supersonic. (Note: Bill Bedford has suggested that Wade may have tried to go supersonic using a vertical dive as was the technique with the F86 Sabre. However, because the P.1081 lacked powered flying controls (unlike the F86) Wade could not recover.) Wade elected to eject, jettisoning the canopy at 9,000 feet (2,700 m) and ejecting at 2,000 feet (610 m). While the ejection was successful, he failed to separate from the seat and was killed on impact with the ground. (Note: The reason for the crash and the seat failure was not determined at the time or subsequently. Wade's death resulted in Percy ('Laddie') Lucas, MP for Brentford and Chiswick, questioning the Minister of Supply on 30 April 1951 about the types of ejector seat fitted to British aircraft, how they were tested and the insurance of British test pilots. While at the time the RAF used Martin Baker ejection seats, the Hawker P.1081 was fitted with an ML seat. Flight 11 May 1951, p. 547)

== Personal life ==
Trevor Wade married Josephine Clow Gibbins on 2 August 1940 at Oxted, with many of his 92 Squadron colleagues attending the service and the reception, which was held at the White Hart in Brasted, Kent. Trevor and Josephine had three children: two sons and a daughter.

== See also ==
- List of RAF aircrew in the Battle of Britain
- List of World War II aces from the United Kingdom
