= Roy Chaplin =

Aeronautical engineer (1899–1988)

Roy Chaplin OBE, FRAeS
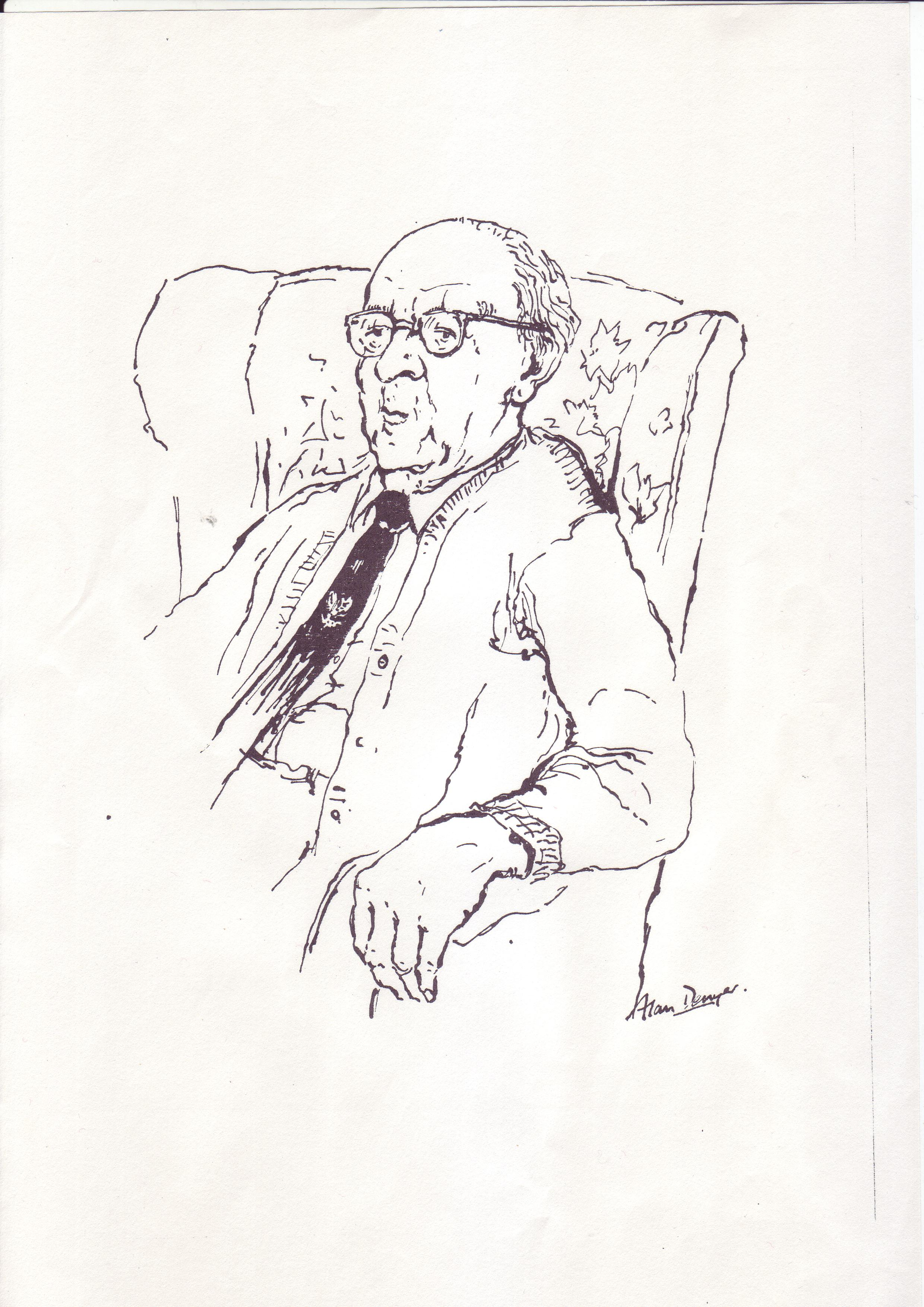
- Roy Chaplin (1899–1988) around 1985
- Born: Roland Henry Chaplin; 16 May 1899; Kingston upon Thames, England
- Died: 13 December 1988 (aged 89); Charlton, England
- Education: Tiffin School
- Spouse: Madge Macey
- Children: 2
- Engineering career
- Discipline: Aeronautics
- Institutions: FRAeS
- Employer: Hawker Aircraft
- Significant design: Hawker Hurricane
- Awards: RAeS Silver Medal (1960)

Roland Henry Chaplin, OBE, FRAeS (16 May 1899 – 13 December 1988), known as Roy Chaplin, was an aeronautical engineer who worked with Sydney Camm at Hawker Aircraft Limited from 1927 to 1962. He helped design the Hawker Fury biplane, the Hurricane monoplane, and the Harrier jump jet. He graduated with a degree in engineering from London University and retired in the 1960s.

== Early life ==
Chaplin was educated at Tiffin Boys School, Kingston upon Thames. He studied engineering at London University. The First World War interrupted his studies, when he was commissioned into the Royal Engineers, serving in France and Belgium until 1919. Chaplin was then obliged to repeat his second year at London University, graduating with an honours degree in engineering (BSc) in 1921. In 1922, Chaplin started his first job at pump manufacturer Gwynnes of Hammersmith.

== Hawker ==
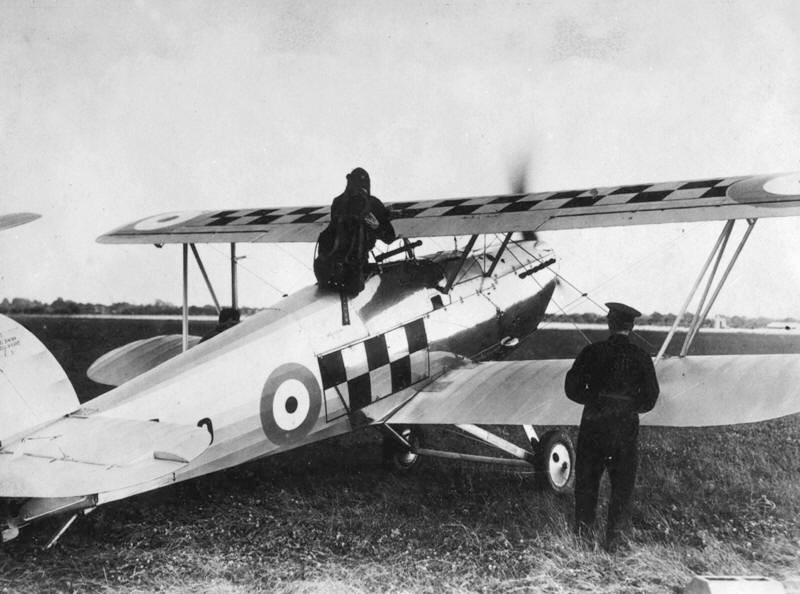
Chaplin worked on the Hawker Fury. This No. 43 Squadron RAF example is c. 1931.

In 1926, Chaplin joined Hawker Aircraft at Kingston, when it had fewer than forty design staff. Chaplin worked on the Hawker Fury biplane design. He recalled that, in 1933, many Air Ministry diehards believed that the monoplane structure was unsuitable and dangerous for use as a military aircraft. Hawker's developed the idea of a monoplane version of the Fury biplane fighter with other refinements, such as an enclosed cockpit. Chaplin played a role in the 1934 development of the 'Hawker Fury Monoplane', which became the 'Hurricane'. The Hurricane prototype first flew from Brooklands on 6 November 1935.

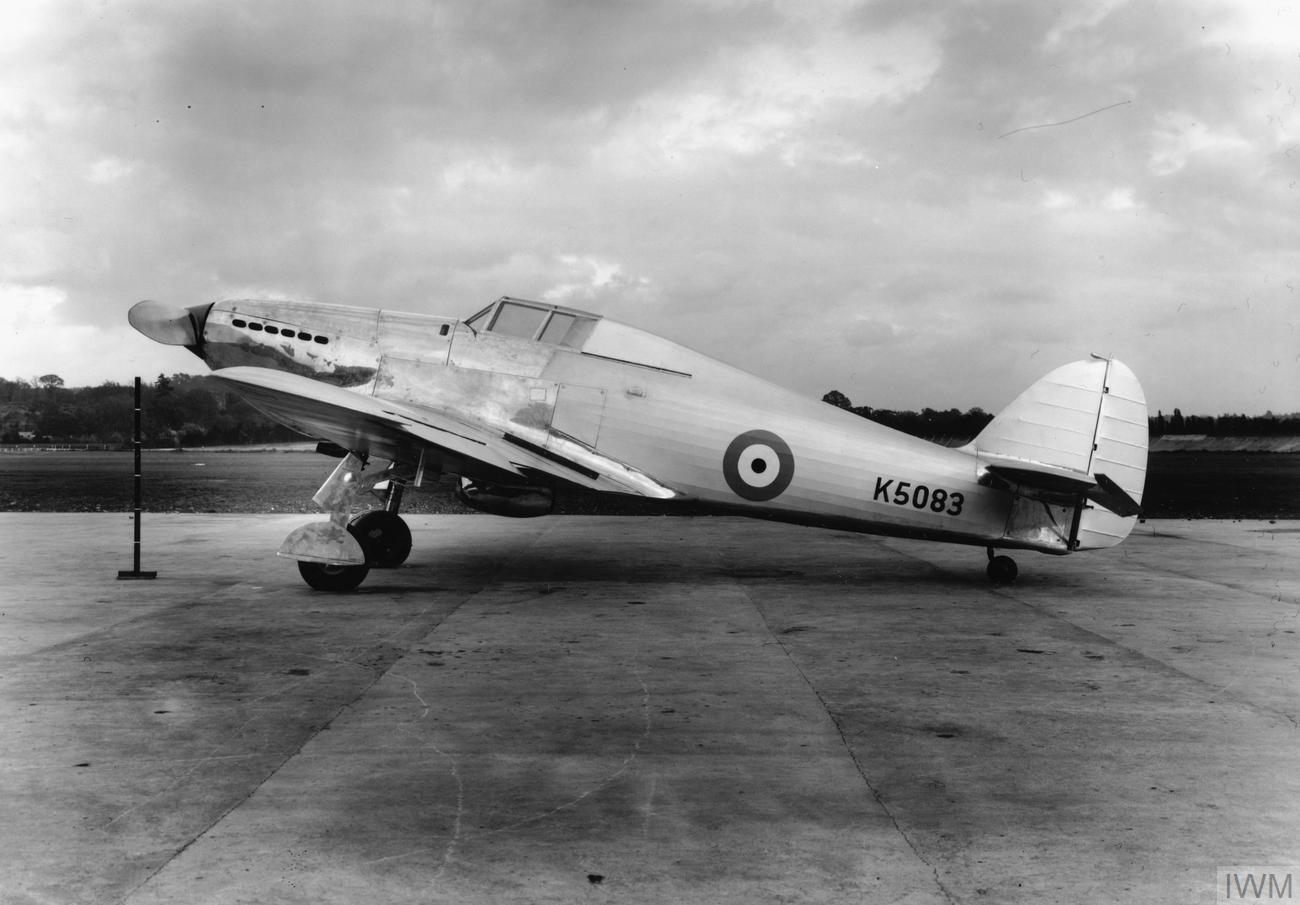
Chaplin's contributions to the design of the Hurricane were rewarded in 1946 with an OBE. Pre-production version at Brooklands, 6 November 1935.

By March 1936, test flying of the prototype was completed. The Hawker Board issued instructions planning, jigging, and tooling for the production of one thousand aircraft. The official contract followed three months later. According to Chaplin, "The Hurricane brought down more enemy aircraft in the Battle of Britain than all the Spitfires, Blenheims, Defiants, and ground defences put together."

In 1939, Chaplin was promoted to assistant chief designer. Ralph Hooper recalled during an interview with Thomas Lean in 2010 that "Sydney Camm used to reduce his secretaries to tears from time to time and Roy Chaplin who was his number two used to come in and cheer them up again". In 1940, Chaplin and most of the Hawker Design Office moved down the Portsmouth Road from Kingston to Claremont, an 18th-century mansion at Esher. From 1937 until after the Second World War, he was involved with the design of the Typhoon, Tempest and Sea Fury aircraft. In 1946 Chaplin's role in the design and development of the Hurricane was acknowledged when he was appointed an Officer of the Order of the British Empire.

== Jets ==
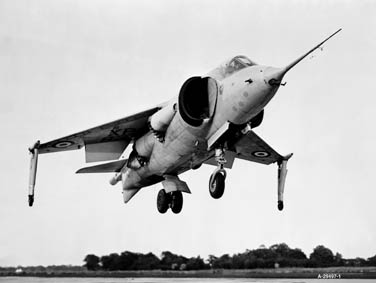
Undated image from NASA. Chaplin was proud of his work on the Harrier jump jet (P.1127).

Less than twenty years after Chaplin joined Hawker's, the company moved into the jet era when work was started on the P.1040 in 1944.

The 1957 Defence White Paper contained the pronouncement that the defence of the country would in the future be achieved with guided weapons, rather than piloted fighters. Hawker's were then proceeding with a private venture design of a Mach 2+ fighter designated P.1121. The cancellation of the P.1121 led to increased emphasis on another project which soon became the P.1127.

In 1957, Chaplin became chief designer and in 1959 an executive director on the Hawker Board. That year an order for two prototypes of the P.1127 was placed, with first flights of this revolutionary machine in 1960. It was eventually developed into the operational Harrier jump jet which was notable for its role in the Falklands conflict. In 1960, the Royal Aeronautical Society awarded Chaplin its Silver Medal "for his achievements in the design and development of military aircraft". In mid-1961 Chaplin suffered a heart attack; he retired in 1962.

== Retirement ==
Hawker's had full UK government support for the supersonic vertical and/or short take-off and landing (V/STOL) P.1154 while its competitor, the British Aircraft Corporation, was building the TSR2. In 1965, Harold Wilson's government realised that the country could afford neither of these aircraft, and abruptly cancelled them.

The 1982 Falklands conflict might not have been won by Britain but for the Harrier, in the opinion of Admiral of the fleet Terence Lewin, Baron Lewin. Libby Fawbert interviewed Chaplin in his quiet Wiltshire home for PM on BBC Radio 4.

1985 was the fiftieth anniversary of the first flight of the Hurricane. The Royal Aeronautical Society organised a Hurricane Golden Jubilee symposium. At eighty-seven years old, Chaplin was the oldest of four speakers who had worked on the design of the aircraft.

Chaplin died on 13 December 1988 at age 89. A Harrier jump-jet flew over the village church in tribute, at the end of his memorial service.

== See also ==
- Aerospace industry in the United Kingdom
- Roy Chaplin interviewed by Geoff Meade in 1982 for Central TV (now ITV Central)

Roy Chaplin interviewed by Geoff Meade in 1982 for Central TV
