= Snarler =

Snarler may refer to:

- Armstrong Siddeley Snarler - a British rocket engine
- A character in the Pretenders (Transformers) toy line
