= Humbel =

Humbel is a surname. Notable people with the surname include:

- Dominik Humbel, Swiss orienteer
- Ruth Humbel (born 1957), Swiss politician and orienteer

== See also ==
- Humble (disambiguation)
