= Humble (surname) =

Humble is a surname. Notable people with the surname include:

- Ben Humble (1903–1977), Scottish author
- Bill Humble (1911–1992), British aviator
- David Humble (born 1967), retired Canadian badminton player
- Deborah Humble (born 1969), Welsh-born Australian operatic mezzo-soprano
- Derek Humble (1931–1971), English jazz saxophonist
- Gwen Humble (born 1953), American actress, spouse of actor Ian McShane
- Jack Humble (1862–1931), English football player
- John Humble, multiple people
- Jim Humble, originator and promoter of Miracle Mineral Supplement which is falsely claimed to cure various diseases
- Joan Humble (born 1951), British Labour Party MP
- John Samuel Humble (born 1956), "Wearside Jack", the Yorkshire Ripper hoaxer
- Kate Humble (born 1968), British television presenter
- Robert Alfred Humble (1864–1929), British priest
- Rod Humble (born 1964), executive producer of video game company Electronic Arts
- Susan Lipanova, née Humble (born 1978), British ice skater
- Tom Humble (born 1988), Australian Rugby League player
- Weldon Humble (1921–1998), American footballer
- William Humble (cricketer) (1846–1924), English clergyman
