= CA-24 =

CA-24 may refer to:

- California State Route 24, a state highway in California
- California's 24th congressional district, a congressional district in California
- USS Pensacola (CA-24), a World War II heavy cruiser
- CAC CA-24, a prototype aircraft
