= Humble =

Humble may refer to:

- Humility, the quality of being humble

== Places ==
- Humble, Denmark
- Humble, Texas, US
  - Humble Civic Center Arena
  - Humble High School
- Humble Island, Antarctica

== People ==
- Humble (surname)
- Humble Howard, Howard Glassman, one half of the Toronto morning radio show duo Humble & Fred
- Humblus, or Humble, a legendary Danish king

== Music ==
- "Humble" (song), by Kendrick Lamar, 2017
- "Humble", a 2020 song by Lil Baby from My Turn
- "Humble", a 2012 song by Soluna Samay

== Other uses ==
- Humble (production studio), an American film and video production company
- Humble baronets, two titles in the baronetage of England, one in the baronetage of the United Kingdom, all extinct
- Humble Building, now the ExxonMobil Building, a skyscraper in Houston, Texas, US
- Humble Oil, a Texas company that became part of Exxon
- Humble Bundle, a digital video game storefront
