= CA-23 =

CA-23 may refer to:

- California State Route 23, a highway in the U.S. state of California
- California's 23rd congressional district, a congressional district in California
- CAC CA-23, a planned all-weather fighter
