= Hawker P.1052 =

Experimental swept wing aircraft by Hawker

P.1052
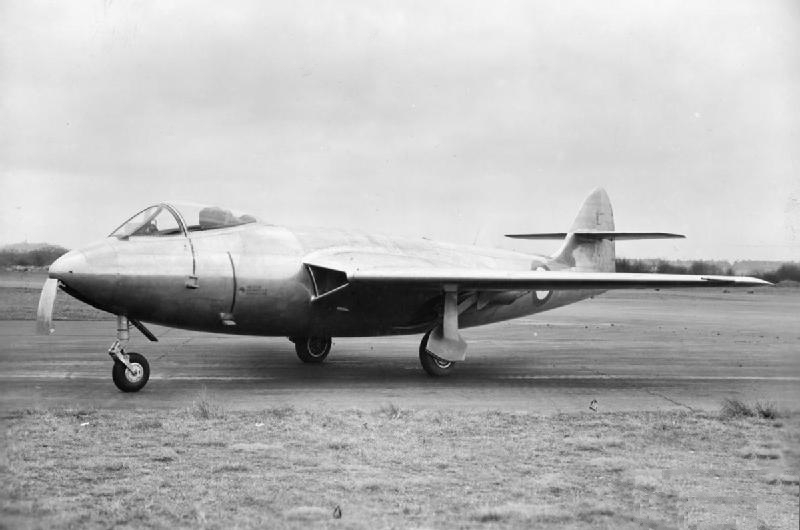
- The first Hawker P.1052, in 1949

General information
- Type: research aircraft
- Manufacturer: Hawker Aircraft Limited
- Status: Experimental
- Primary user: Royal Aircraft Establishment
- Number built: 2

History
- First flight: 19 November 1948
- Developed from: Hawker Sea Hawk
- Variants: Hawker P.1081

The Hawker P.1052 was a British experimental aircraft built by Hawker Aircraft Limited for trials with swept wings.

== Design and development ==
The origins of the P.1052 were in a 1945 design study by the Hawker design team for a development of the P.1040 using swept back wings. Interest was not shown by the Ministry of Supply until the spring of 1946 when Air Ministry specification E.38/46 (to undertake studies into the aerodynamic properties of swept wings) was issued, and a contract awarded in May 1947 for Hawker to supply two prototypes.

A 35 degree sweep in the wings was the most significant aerodynamic innovation in the P.1052, relative to the P.1040. This feature was developed in conjunction with the RAE at Farnborough. In addition, the tailplane was cropped to a shorter span (by removing the rounded tips on the P.1040) and was adjustable in incidence to allow changes in trim at the anticipated higher speeds.

The first prototype (VX272) was ready in time for static exhibition at the 1948 S.B.A.C Farnborough display, but permission was withheld on grounds of secrecy. It first flew on 19 November 1948, with the second prototype (VX279) flying on 13 April 1949.

In late 1949 or early 1950, following tests on a third, non-flying airframe, VX272 had both wings and fuselage strengthened. At around the same time, VX279 was fitted with a variable incidence tailplane.

During 1950, VX279 was significantly rebuilt, with a single jet outlet and swept empennage; it was subsequently given a separate designation, as the Hawker P.1081.

VX272 was retro-fitted with the original rear fuselage of VX279 – after strengthening and installation of an arrestor hook. VX272 was also fitted with a bullet-type fairing at the tailplane-fin intersection, which improved its high-speed behaviour.

In May 1952, with the addition of a long-stroke undercarriage (from a Sea Hawk), VX272 undertook take-off and landing trials on board HMS Eagle. In June the same year, it received a final modification: a variable incidence swept tailplane, after which it flew high-speed trials with the RAE. These were terminated and VX272 was removed from service in September 1953, following a forced landing.

The focus of research at Hawker was transferred to the P.1067, which would become better known as the Hawker Hunter. No further examples of the P.1052 were built. In hindsight, the P.1052 may be seen as part of a transition from the centrifugally powered, straight-winged Sea Hawk to the axially powered, swept-wing Hunter.

The P.1078 – a variant in which the P.1052 was to have been augmented by a small built-in rocket engine (i.e. the Armstrong Siddeley Snarler), became the subject of a design study. However, because work on another rocket-powered design – the P.1040-based Hawker P.1072 (which had un-swept wings) – was significantly advanced, the P.1078 was never built.

== Aircraft on display ==
The first prototype VX272 is displayed at the Fleet Air Arm Museum, Yeovilton.

== Operators ==
United Kingdom

- Royal Aircraft Establishment

== Specifications (P.1052) ==
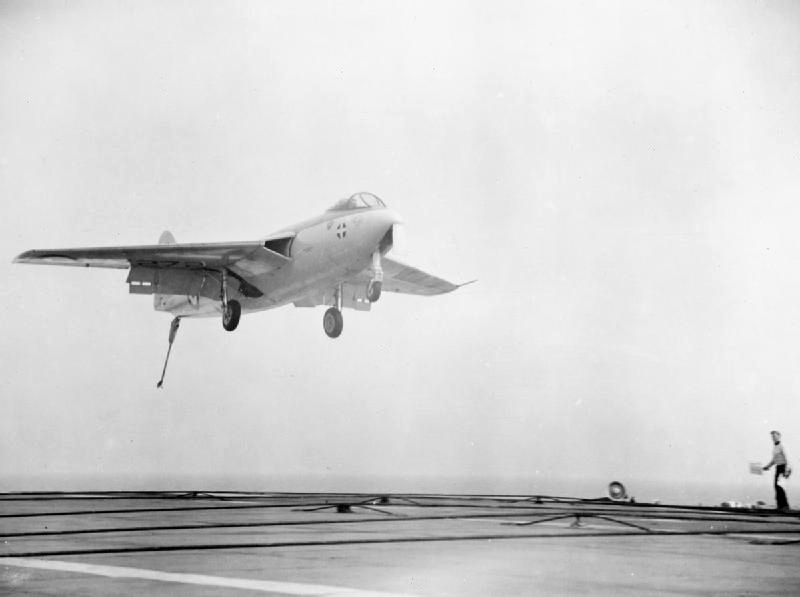
A Hawker P.1052 landing aboard HMS Eagle (R05), 1952.

Data from Hawker aircraft since 1920

General characteristics

- Crew: 1
- Length: 39 ft 7 in (12.07 m) Straight tailplane

40 ft 3 in (12 m) swept tailplane

- Wingspan: 31 ft 6 in (9.60 m)
- Height: 10 ft 6 in (3.20 m)
- Wing area: 258 sq ft (24.0 m^{2})
- Empty weight: 9,450 lb (4,286 kg)
- Gross weight: 13,488 lb (6,118 kg)
- Powerplant: 1 × Rolls-Royce RN.2 Nene centrifugal-flow turbojet engine, 5,000 lbf (22 kN) thrust

Performance

- Maximum speed: 593 mph (954 km/h, 515 kn) at sea level
- Maximum speed: Mach 0.87 (661 mph, 1065 km/h, 575 kn) at 36,000 ft (10,973 m) with swept tailplane
- Service ceiling: 45,500 ft (13,900 m)
- Rate of climb: 3,864 ft/min (19.63 m/s)
- Time to altitude: 35,000 ft (10,668 m) in 9 minutes 30 seconds

== Bibliography ==
- Buttler, Tony (2015). X-Planes of Europe. Vol. II: Military Prototype Aircraft from the Golden Age 1946–1974. Manchester, UK: Hikoki Publications. ISBN 978-1-90210-948-0.
- Mason, Francis K. (1971). Hawker Aircraft since 1920 (2nd ed.). London: Putnam. ISBN 0-370-00066-8.
- "P.1052". Flight. 9 February 1950. pp. 189–194.
- McLelland, Tim (2013). Britain's Cold War Fighters. Fonthill Media. ISBN 978-1-78155-100-4.
