= Hawker Aircraft =

British aircraft manufacturer

Hawker Aircraft Limited
- Industry: Aviation
- Predecessor: Sopwith Aviation & Engineering Company
- Founded: 1920; 106 years ago (as H.G. Hawker Engineering)
- Defunct: 1963; 63 years ago
- Fate: Merged into Hawker Siddeley Group
- Successor: Hawker Siddeley Aviation
- Headquarters: Kingston upon Thames, Greater London, UK
- Number of locations: Langley, Dunsfold, Blackpool
- Key people: Harry Hawker; Thomas Sopwith; Sydney Camm
- Products: Aircraft
- Subsidiaries: Gloster Aircraft Company (1934)

Hawker Aircraft Limited was a British aircraft manufacturer that was responsible for some of the most famous products in British aviation history.

== History ==
Hawker had its roots in the aftermath of the First World War, which resulted in the bankruptcy of the Sopwith Aviation Company. Sopwith test pilot Harry Hawker and three others, including Thomas Sopwith and Frederick Sigrist, bought the assets of Sopwith and formed H. G. Hawker Engineering in 1920.

In 1933, the company was renamed Hawker Aircraft Limited, and it took advantage of the Great Depression and a strong financial position to purchase the Gloster Aircraft Company in 1934. The next year, it merged with the engine and automotive company Armstrong Siddeley and its subsidiary, Armstrong Whitworth Aircraft, to form Hawker Siddeley Aircraft. This group also encompassed A. V. Roe and Company (Avro).

The company continued to produce designs under the "Hawker" name as part of Hawker Siddeley Aircraft, which from 1955 was a division of Hawker Siddeley Group. In 1963, the "Hawker" brand name was dropped, along with those of the sister companies; the Hawker P.1127 was the last aircraft to carry the brand name.

The Hawker legacy was maintained by the American company Raytheon, which produced business jets (including some derived from the 125, whose original design dated back to de Havilland days) under the "Hawker" name. This was the result of purchasing British Aerospace's product line in 1993. The name was also used by Hawker Beechcraft after Raytheon's business jet interests (Hawker and Beechcraft) were acquired by investors and merged.

== Products ==
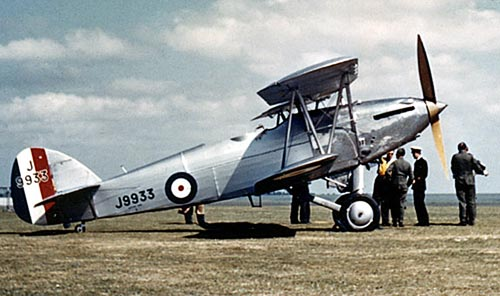
Hawker Hart G-ABMR

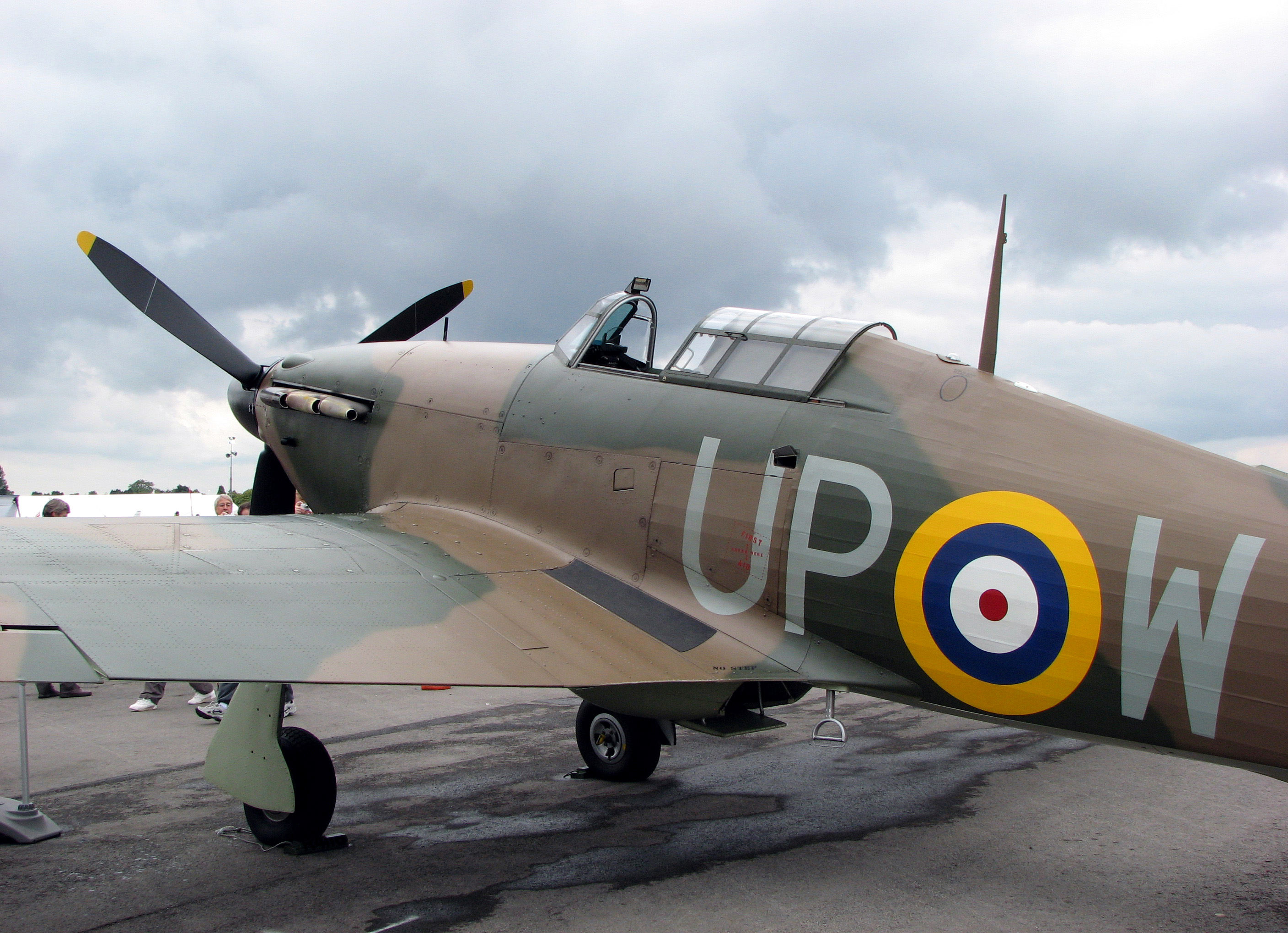
Hurricane Mk.I

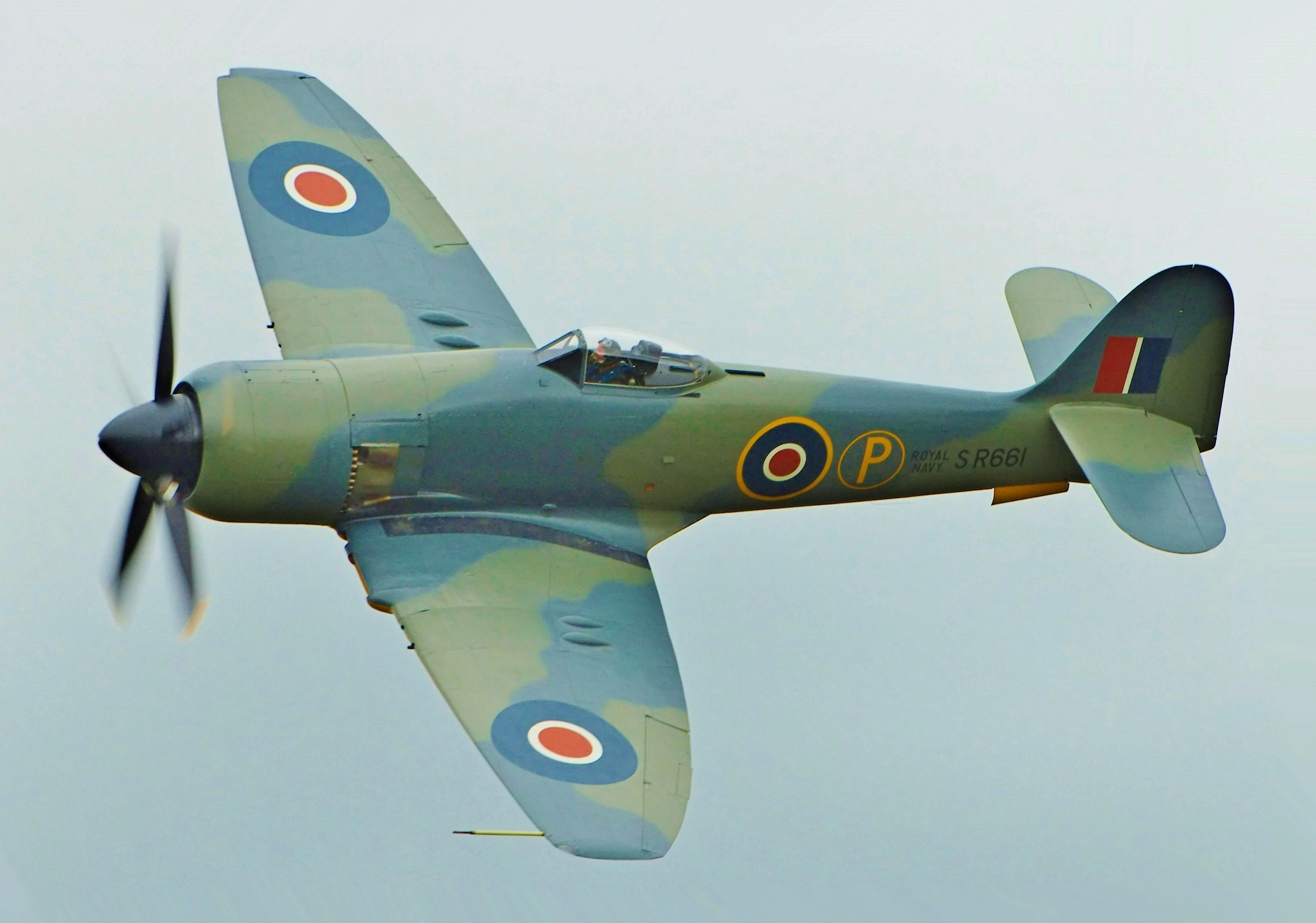
Sea Fury

The first Hawker design was the unbuilt Hawker Humpback of December 1920. This was soon followed by the Hawker Duiker, the first prototype, which flew in July 1923. In the interwar years, Hawker produced a successful line of bombers and fighters for the Royal Air Force, the product of Sydney Camm (later Sir Sydney) and his team. These included the Hawker Hind and the Hawker Hart, which became the most produced UK aeroplane in the years before the Second World War.

During the Second World War, the Hawker Siddeley company was one of the United Kingdom's most important aviation concerns, producing numerous designs including the famous Hawker Hurricane fighter plane that, along with the Supermarine Spitfire, was instrumental in winning the Battle of Britain. During the battle, Hawker Hurricanes in service outnumbered all other British fighters combined, and were responsible for shooting down 55 per cent of all enemy aircraft destroyed.

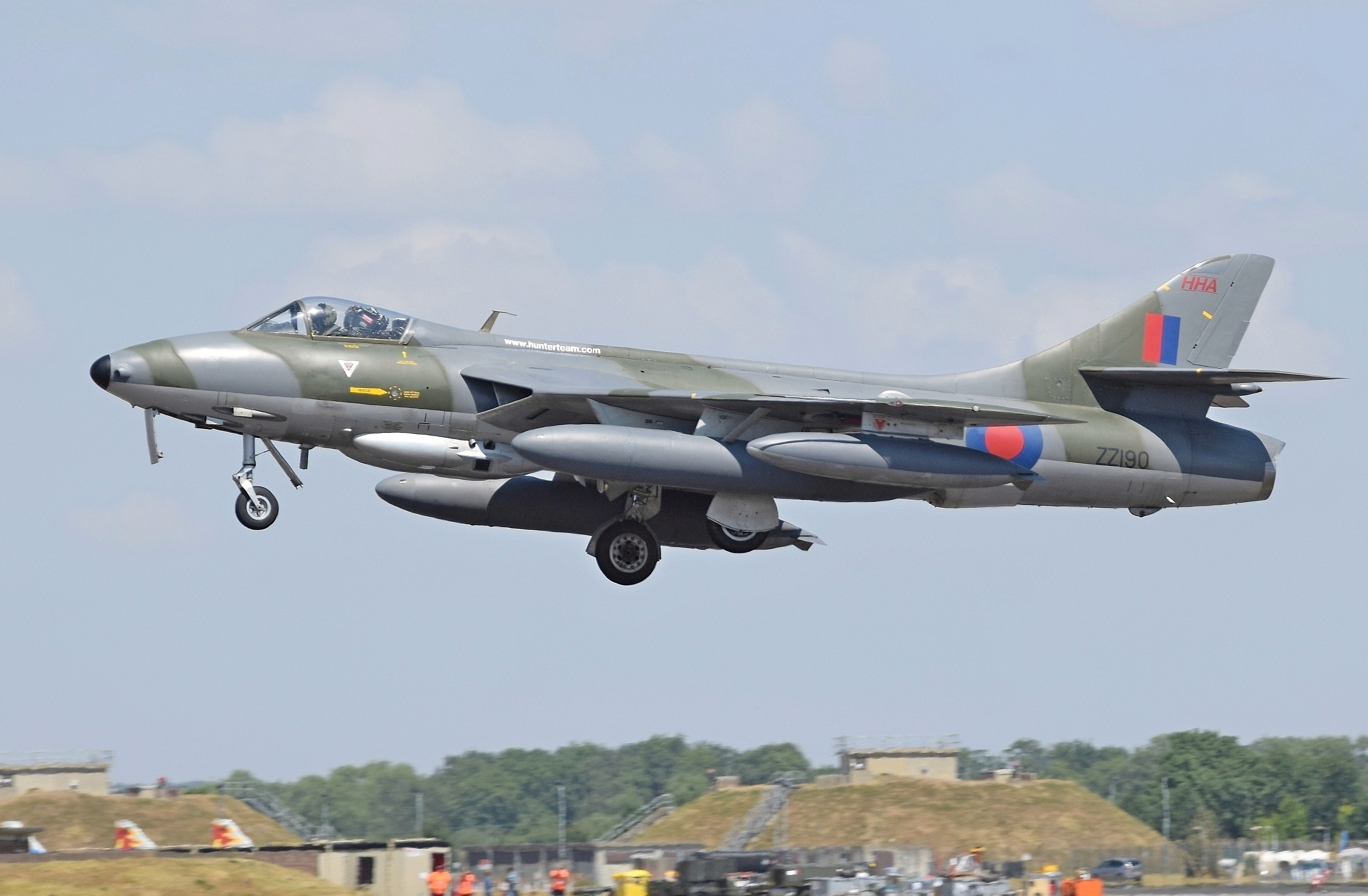
Hawker Hunter F.58 (ZZ190, ex-Swiss Air Force)) of Hawker Hunter Aviation arrives at the 2018 RIAT, England

=== Aircraft ===
- Hawker Duiker 1923 prototype – first original design by Hawker, 1 aircraft built, J6918
- Hawker Woodcock 1923
- Hawker Cygnet 1924
- Hawker Hedgehog 1924 prototype
- Hawker Horsley 1925
- Hawker Heron 1925
- Hawker Hornbill 1925
- Hawker Danecock 1925
- Hawker Harrier 1927 prototype
- Hawker Hawfinch 1927
- Hawker Hart 1928
- Hawker F.20/27 1928 prototype
- Hawker Hoopoe 1928
- Hawker Tomtit 1928
- Hawker Hornet 1929
- Hawker Osprey 1929
- Hawker Nimrod 1930
- Hawker Fury 1931
- Hawker Audax 1931 - army cooperation derivative of Hart
- Hawker Dantorp 1932- biplane bomber developed from Horsley for Royal Danish Navy
- Hawker Demon 1933 - fighter developed from Hart
- Hawker Hardy 1933 - general purpose aircraft variant of Hart
- Hawker P.V.3 1934 prototype
- Hawker Hind 1934 - developed from Hart
- Hawker P.V.4 1934 prototype
- Hawker Hartbeest 1935
- Hawker Hurricane 1935
- Hawker Sea Hurricane
- Hawker Hector 1936 - army cooperation aircraft developed from Hind, used Napier Dagger engine
- Hawker Henley 1937
- Hawker Hotspur 1938
- Hawker Tornado 1939
- Hawker Typhoon 1940
- Hawker Tempest 1942
- Hawker F.2/43 Fury 1943 prototype
- Hawker Sea Fury 1944
- Hawker P.1040 1947 prototype leading to Sea Hawk
- Hawker Sea Hawk 1947
- Hawker P.1052 1948 prototype
- Hawker P.1072 1950 prototype
- Hawker P.1078 prototype
- Hawker P.1081 1950 prototype
- Hawker Hunter 1951
- Hawker P.1127 1960 experimental V/STOL aircraft

=== Projects ===
Source: Hannah (1982)

- Hawker P.1000
- Hawker P.1004
- Hawker P.1005 - high speed unarmed bomber, to be powered by two Napier Sabre engines, to Specification B11/41
- Hawker P.1007
- Hawker P.1008
- Hawker P.1014
- Hawker P.1017
- Hawker P.1021
- Hawker P.1025
- Hawker P.1027
- Hawker P.1028
- Hawker P.1029
- Hawker P.1030
- Hawker P.1031
- Hawker P.1037
- Hawker P.1140 Sea Hawk
- Hawker P.1041
- Hawker P.1044
- Hawker P.1146 Swept delta wing idea for P1040
- Hawker P.1048 Straight wing twin engine (like Me 262)
- Hawker P.1049
- Hawker P.1050
- Hawker P.1051
- Hawker P.1052 Swept wing Sea Hawk prototype
- Hawker P.1056 Night fighter variant of P1048
- Hawker P.1053
- Hawker P.1054
- Hawker P.1055
- Hawker P.1056
- Hawker P.1057 Swept wing idea
- Hawker P.1058
- Hawker P.1061 dual engine straight wing
- Hawker P.1062 swept wing derivative of P1040
- Hawker P.1063
- Hawker P.1064 swept wing idea with high tailplane
- Hawker P.1065 swept wing with rocket boost
- Hawker P.1067 idea for swept wing with Avon engine Hunter prototype
- Hawker P.1069
- Hawker P.1070
- Hawker P.1071
- Hawker P.1072 Version Sea Hawk with rocket
- Hawker P.1073
- Hawker P.1077
- Hawker P.1079
- Hawker P.1081 Second prototype derived from P1052
- Hawker P.1082
- Hawker P.1084
- Hawker P.1083 4th prototype Hunter
- Hawker P.1085
- Hawker P.1088
- Hawker P.1089
- Hawker P.1090 drawing for Gyron engined Hunter
- Hawker P.1091 drawing for tail less delta Hunter
- Hawker P.1092
- Hawker P.1093 drawing for supersonic delta
- Hawker P.1096
- Hawker P.1098
- Hawker P.1099 Avon engined Hunter
- Hawker P.1100 drawing for thin wing Hunter
- Hawker P.1101 Dual seat hunter
- Hawker P.1103 1950s interceptor project
- Hawker P.1104
- Hawker P.1106
- Hawker P.1107
- Hawker P.1108
- Hawker P.1109 Hunter variant
- Hawker P.1121 late 1950s supersonic fighter project evolved from P1103
- Hawker P.1124 Drawing Mach 2 target aircraft
- Hawker P.1125
- Hawker P.1126 VTOL double delta wing fighter
- Hawker P.1128 Drawing for Executive jet version of Hunter
- Hawker P.1129
- Hawker P.1131
- Hawker P.1132
- Hawker P.1134
- Hawker P.1136
- Hawker P.1137
- Hawker P.1139
- Hawker P.1141
- Hawker P.1143
- Hawker P.1149
- Hawker P.1152
- Hawker P.1154 1960s design for a supersonic VTOL
- Hawker P.1182 Hawk trainer
- Hawker P.1214 1980s X wing VTOL design
- Hawker P.1216 1980s swept wing VTOL design of P1214

== Key people ==
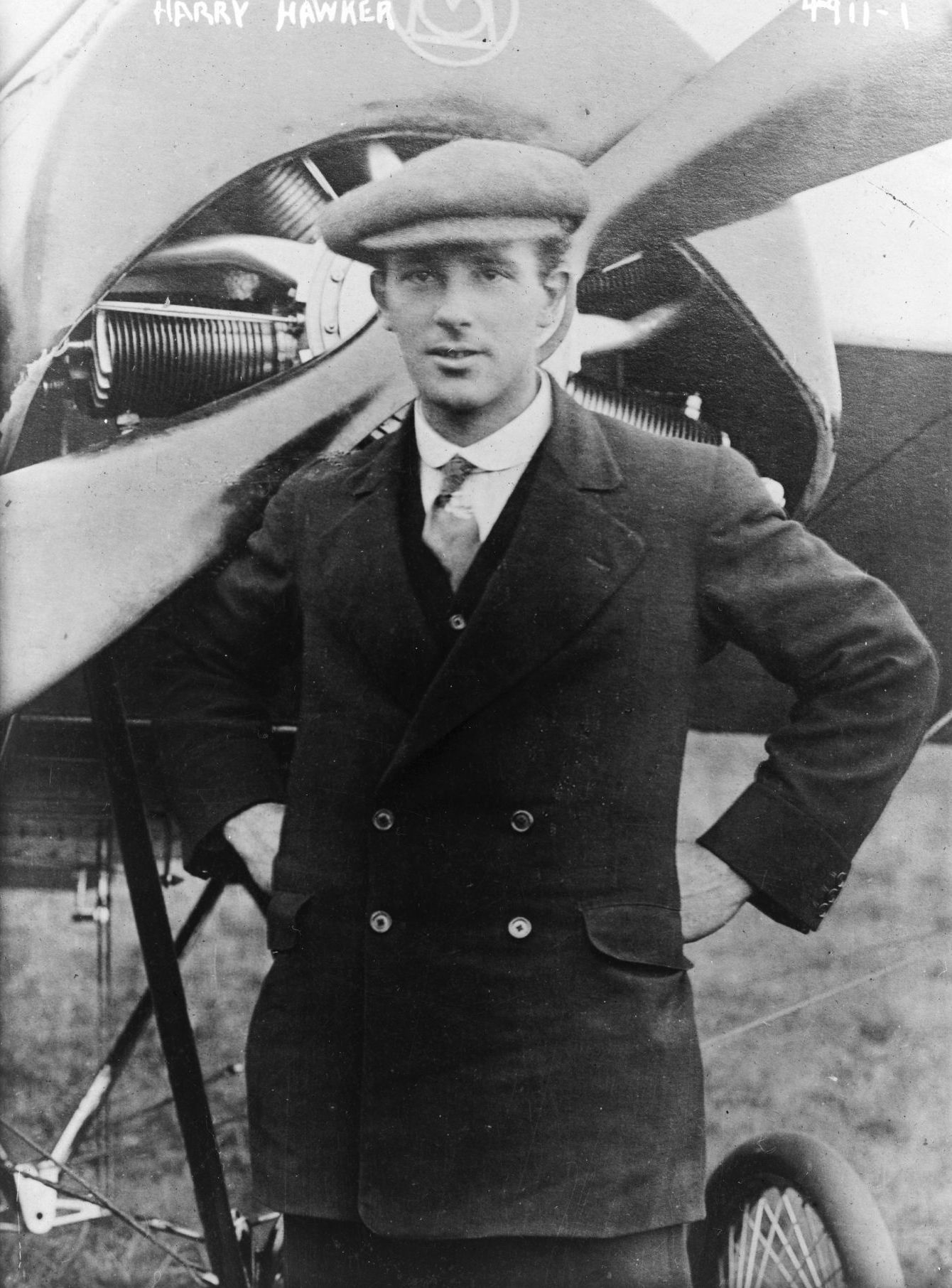
Harry Hawker in May 1919

- Harry Hawker
- Thomas Sopwith

=== Aircraft designers and engineers ===
- Sydney Camm
- Roy Chaplin
- Robert Lickley
- Richard Walker

=== Chief test pilots ===
- George Bulman
- Bill Humble
- Wimpy Wade
- Neville Duke
- Bill Bedford
- Frank Murphy

== See also ==
- Aerospace industry in the United Kingdom
