= Philip Lucas =

English aviator and test pilot

- Born: Philip Gadesden Lucas; 3 September 1902; Bexleyheath, Kent, England
- Died: 18 December 1981 (aged 79); Crawley, Sussex, England
- Occupation: Test Pilot
- Years active: 1926–1967
- Awards: George Medal

Philip Lucas GM (1902–1981) was an English aviator and test pilot who was awarded the George Medal for his courage and skill landing a damaged Hawker Typhoon prototype.

Philip Gadesden Lucas was born on 3 September 1902 at Bexleyheath, Kent and was educated at Epsom College before starting an apprenticeship with Vickers. He joined the Royal Air Force in 1926 and by 1931 had joined Hawker Aircraft as a test pilot. In 1939 he became Hawker's Chief Experimental Test Pilot operating from Brooklands in Surrey and Langley in Buckinghamshire. He flew the Hawker Hurricane, Hawker Typhoon and Hawker Tempest straight from the production line and for development flying.

In 1941 Lucas was flying a Hawker Typhoon prototype that he managed to land safely after it suffered a structural failure during flight. For his courage and skill he was awarded the George Medal:

Test Pilot Lucas displayed great courage and presence of mind during a test flight and, by his skill and coolness, saved an aircraft from destruction.

— London Gazette

Lucas retired from test flying in 1946 and became general manager of Hawker Aircraft, which by the time he retired in 1967 had become Hawker Siddeley Aviation. He died in Crawley, West Sussex on 18 December 1981, aged 79.
