= John Humble =

John Humble may refer to:

== Baronets ==
- Sir John Humble, 4th Baronet (1680–1724) of the Humble Baronets
- Sir John Humble, 6th Baronet (c. 1739–1745) of the Humble Baronets
- Sir John Nugent Humble, 1st Baronet (1785–1834) of the Nugent baronets
- Sir John Nugent Humble, 2nd Baronet (1818–1886) of the Nugent baronets
- Sir John Nugent Nugent, 3rd Baronet (1849–1929) of the Nugent baronets

== Others ==
- John Humble (artist), American photographer (1944–2025)
- John Humble (footballer)
- John Humble (hoaxer), also known as Wearside Jack, British man who pretended to be the Yorkshire Ripper (Peter Sutcliffe)
