= Sir William Humble, 1st Baronet =

English leather merchant

Sir William Humble, 1st Baronet (1612 – 26 December 1686) was an English merchant and financier.

== Biography ==
Humble was the son of George Humble, a London stationer. Humble became a prominent and successful leather seller, and in 1653–54 he served as master of the Worshipful Company of Leathersellers. He was an ardent Royalist, and during the exile of Charles II, Humble lent £20,000 to the king in the hope of facilitating his return to England. Upon the Stuart Restoration, on 21 June 1660 Humble was created a baronet, of London in the Baronetage of England in recognition of his loyalty to Charles II. He later served as High Sheriff of Surrey in 1664 and High Sheriff of Lincolnshire in 1672. He died in 1686 and was succeeded in his title and estates by his grandson, William.

Honorary titles
Preceded by Sir Edmund Winn, Bt	High Sheriff of Lincolnshire; 1672	Succeeded by John Luddington
Preceded by Sir Walter Plomer	High Sheriff of Surrey; 1664	Succeeded by Sir John Evelyn, Bt
Baronetage of England
New creation	Baronet (of London); 1660–1686	Succeeded by William Humble
