= CAC CA-23 =

Cancelled Australian fighter aircraft

CA-23
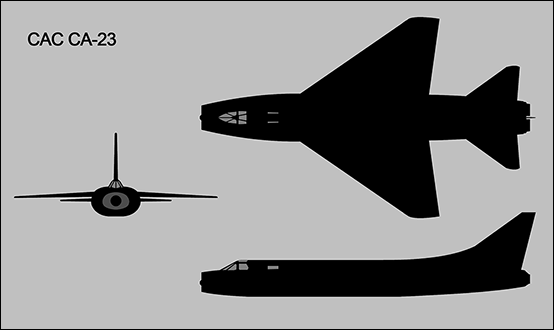

General information
- Type: All-weather fighter
- National origin: Australia
- Manufacturer: Commonwealth Aircraft Corporation
- Status: Cancelled
- Primary user: Royal Australian Air Force (intended)

The CAC CA-23 was a planned supersonic, twinjet, two-seat, all-weather fighter aircraft designed by the Commonwealth Aircraft Corporation of Australia.

== Design and development ==
In 1949, the Royal Australian Air Force (RAAF) began assessing replacements for its locally-built Commonwealth Aircraft Corporation (CAC) Mustangs and De Havilland Australia (DHA) Vampires. US and British designs were considered, including the Hawker P.1081 (which had been developed with the RAAF in mind) and the Grumman F9F Panther. The Commonwealth Aircraft Corporation (CAC), which had developed an extensive and proven in-house design capability during World War II, submitted a detailed proposal for a twin-jet, all-weather fighter with a two-seat cockpit, the CA-23. On the basis of CAC's track record, the Department of Defence Production granted funds to CAC for further development of its concept.

The CAC CA-23 concept included two then-unconventional features. Firstly, its planform combined a delta wing with low-set horizontal stabilisers. Secondly, a distinctive, wide nose air intake for the jet engines. It was originally conceived as powered by two Rolls-Royce Tay engines; the final version was however designed for the more powerful Rolls-Royce Avon turbojet engines. The aircraft was to be fitted with the most up to date radar and electronic equipment. Its anticipated top speed was to be about Mach 1.5, which was much faster than any then-existing aircraft.

Over the life of the project, many mock-up models were made at different scales, with hundreds of detailed drawings, plus wind tunnel tests proving the delta wing was more than satisfactory. The program was described by a contemporary British visitor to CAC as "a most ambitious design for a fighter and as advanced as anything yet seen in any other part of the world."

The four-year project was cancelled in 1953 after the expenditure of £163,195 with extensive aeronautical R&D testing in wind tunnels in Australia and at the Royal Aircraft Establishment (RAE) in the UK. The testing results were so promising and ground breaking for a delta wing design that RAE requested permission to distribute the data to major UK aircraft manufacturers and Avro Canada.

== Controversy and cancellation ==
The decision to cancel the CAC CA-23 project was controversial at the time among the Australian political elite and aircraft industry insiders. The official reason given for the cancellation for the project was that it had failed to meet key design criteria as an all-weather jet fighter, in failing to incorporate a working radar design into the nose cone. However, the change of the Federal Australian Government had brought about a significant change in policy and priorities around indigenous aircraft design and production. This new policy arose from the November 1951 British mission to Australia on developing aircraft (Aircraft Development Mission) design and cooperation. Further, the appointment of a British officer, Sir James Donald Hardman, as Chief of the Air Staff for the Royal Australian Air Force on 14 January 1952, with supervision of aircraft procurement, saw a fundamental policy shift occur. Hardman deemed that aircraft design costs were prohibitive and advanced aeronautical R&D design work should be centralised and resources pooled with Britain, in Britain. From this point forward the policy was to adapt proven aircraft for Australian conditions, not start from scratch. Along with this decision, a series of negative reports by the U.K. Ministry of Supply were cited about the CA-23, which contained false assumptions and data comparisons, that led to terse rebuttal letter from Sir Lawrence J Wackett to U.K. Govt. However, in time, the preference for British designed aircraft was subsequently overturned by the following Australian Chief of Air Staff John McCauley, who once again switched back to American designed and Australian built aircraft.

The CA-23 design work was abandoned in the early 1950s by the Commonwealth Aircraft Corporation, after the government asked CAC to produce an up-engined variant of the North American F-86 Sabre: the CAC Sabre was also powered by the Rolls-Royce Avon. In correspondence CAC stated "It is not possible to make significant changes to the Sabre for installation Avon engine area without a team of engineers that has been extended to work on a long-range fighter aircraft". The CAC Sabre used a British jet engine that required extensive redesign work beyond what had been originally expected.

== Similarities with other aircraft ==
The similarities between the CA-23 and later designs – including production fighter aircraft – developed outside Australia, have led to conjecture and conspiracy theories, suggesting that CAC's detailed concept and test data, may have directly influenced other designers.

While no conclusive proof has been made public, some circumstances are suggestive of such links. During the CA-23's development, wind tunnel tests were carried out on the CA-23 in collaboration with the UK Royal Aircraft Establishment – which had been reportedly compromised at the time by at least one Soviet agent (i. e. Wilfred Vernon). In addition, the UK Swept Wing Advisory Committee (with the permission of the Australian Department of Defence Production) distributed detailed design drawings and wind tunnel data relating to the CA-23, to 15 UK aircraft manufacturers and Avro Canada. Similarities have been noted to some subsequent production aircraft, both western (such as the English Electric Lightning) and Soviet aircraft (e. g. the Sukhoi Su-7).

== Specifications ==
Data from Australian Military Experimental and Prototype Aircraft

General characteristics

- Crew: 2
- Length: 54 ft (16 m)
- Wingspan: 44 ft (13 m)
- Height: 12 ft (3.7 m)
- Empty weight: 23,325 lb (10,580 kg)
- Powerplant: 2 × Rolls-Royce Avon turbojet engines

Performance

- Maximum speed: Mach 1.5
- Service ceiling: 47,500 ft (14,500 m)

Armament

- Guns: 4 x 0.5 in (12.70 mm) machine-guns with 250 rounds per gun

== See also ==
- Hawker P.1081
- CAC Sabre
- Supermarine Type 553
- English Electric Lightning
- Sukhoi Su-7
