= Hawker P.1072 =

Experimental British aircraft

P.1072

General information
- Type: experimental aircraft
- Manufacturer: Hawker Aircraft
- Number built: 1

History
- First flight: 20 November 1950
- Developed from: Hawker P.1040

The Hawker P.1072 was a 1949 experimental British aircraft acting as a test bed for the Armstrong Siddeley Snarler rocket booster engine. It was the prototype Hawker Sea Hawk modified to install the rocket in the tail.

== Development ==
After the Second World War Hawker was working on a new fighter under their internal designation P.1040 which later became the Hawker Sea Hawk.

Armstrong Siddeley had begun work in 1946 to develop a liquid-fuelled rocket motor (to be used as a booster unit for fighters) for the Ministry of Supply. To investigate the feasibility of rocket-powered fighter aircraft, the original Sea Hawk prototype, VP401, was converted into a test bed for the Armstrong Siddeley Snarler rocket motor, in addition to its normal Rolls-Royce Nene turbojet, becoming the P.1072. The P.1040 had a split exhaust which gave space in the tail free for the installation of the rocket.

The Snarler was pump fed rather than by pressurization of the fuel tanks. The installation of the rocket motor required considerable reinforcement of the fuselage as well as completely revised pneumatic and fuel systems. Jet engine fuel capacity was reduced from 395 gal (1,520 L) to 175 gal (675 L) and two tanks for rocket fuel were installed. The cylindrical liquid oxygen tank in the forward fuselage had a capacity of 75 gal (288 L), and the water-methanol tank in the rear fuselage had a capacity of 120 gal (460 L). External differences were limited to a slight bulge in the rear fuselage under the rudder and a fairing on the bottom centerline of the fuselage, covering piping between the tanks and the rocket motor in the tail.

The Rolls-Royce Nene 103 with 5,180 lbf (23.1 kN) of thrust was used for the ferry flights and for takeoff and initial climb. The Snarler rocket which developed 2,000 lbf (8.9 kN) of thrust was first used in flight on 20 November 1950. There were limitations on the six flights were made using the rocket motor before a minor explosion damaged the aircraft. Soon after, the British government decided that turbojets with reheat (afterburner) would be used instead of rocket power.

== Specifications (P.1072) ==
Data from British Aircraft Directory

General characteristics

- Crew: 1
- Length: 37 ft 7 in (11.46 m)
- Wingspan: 36 ft 6 in (11.13 m)
- Height: 8 ft 9 in (2.67 m)
- Wing area: 264.7 sq ft (24.59 m^{2})
- Empty weight: 11,050 lb (5,012 kg)
- Gross weight: 14,500 lb (6,577 kg)
- Fuel capacity: Turbine fuel: 175 imp gal (210 US gal; 800 L); Rocket oxidiser: 75 imp gal (90 US gal; 340 L); Rocket fuel: 120 imp gal (140 US gal; 550 L)
- Powerplant: 1 × Rolls-Royce Nene 103 centrifugal flow turbojet, 5,180 lbf (23.0 kN) thrust main engine
- Powerplant: 1 × Armstrong Siddeley ASSn.1 Snarler liquid-fuelled rocket, 2,000 lbf (8.9 kN) thrust endurance: 2 minutes 45 seconds

Performance

- Maximum speed: 553 mph (890 km/h, 481 kn)
- Cruise speed: 447 mph (719 km/h, 388 kn)
- Range: 350 mi (560 km, 300 nmi)
- Service ceiling: 44,500 ft (13,600 m)
- Rate of climb: 5,000 ft/min (25 m/s)
- Wing loading: 53 lb/sq ft (260 kg/m^{2})
- Thrust/weight: 0.51

== See also ==
- Saunders-Roe SR.53
