= Humble baronets =

Historical baronets of the British Isles

There have been three baronetcies created for persons with the surname Humble, two in the Baronetage of England and one in the Baronetage of the United Kingdom. All are extinct.

The Humble Baronetcy, of London, was created in the Baronetage of England on 21 June 1660 for William Humble, in recognition of the £20,000 he provided to the exiled Charles II. The third Baronet was killed in a quarrel at the Blue Posts Tavern. The title became extinct on the early death of the sixth Baronet in 1745.

The Humble Baronetcy, of Kensington in the County of Middlesex, was created in the Baronetage of England on 16 March 1687 for William Humble. He was the second son of the first Baronet of the 1660 creation. The title became extinct on Humble's death in 1709.

The Humble, later Nugent Baronetcy, of Cloncoskoran in the County of Waterford, was created in the Baronetage of the United Kingdom on 30 September 1831. For more information on this creation, see Nugent baronets.

== Humble baronets, of London (1660) ==
Escutcheon of the Humble baronets of London (1660), and of Kensington (1687)

- Sir William Humble, 1st Baronet (1612–1686)
- Sir William Humble, 2nd Baronet (c. 1667–1687)
- Sir George Humble, 3rd Baronet (c. 1670–1703)
- Sir John Humble, 4th Baronet (1680–1724)
- Sir William Humble, 5th Baronet (died 1742)
- Sir John Humble, 6th Baronet (c. 1739–1745)

== Humble baronets, of Kensington (1687) ==
- Sir William Humble, 1st Baronet (c. 1650–1709)

== Humble, later Nugent baronets, of Cloncoskoran (1831) ==
- see Nugent baronets
