= Hawker P.1081 =

Prototype British fighter aircraft

P.1081
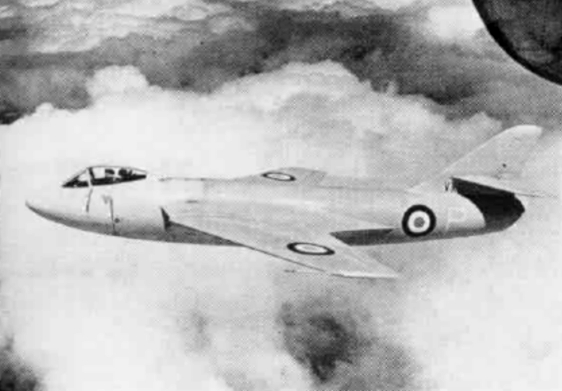

General information
- Type: Fighter aircraft
- Manufacturer: Hawker Aircraft
- Status: Destroyed in flying accident - 3 April 1951
- Primary user: Royal Aircraft Establishment
- Number built: 1

History
- First flight: 19 June 1950
- Developed from: Hawker P.1052

The Hawker P.1081, also known as the "Australian Fighter", was a prototype British jet aircraft from the mid-twentieth century. The single example built was destroyed in a crash in 1951.

== Design and development ==
In 1949, the Royal Australian Air Force (RAAF) began assessing replacements for two fighters built in Australia: the Mustangs built by Commonwealth Aircraft Corporation (CAC) and Vampires of De Havilland Australia (DHA). A series of designs were considered, including the Grumman F9F Panther and the CAC CA-23 – an unconventional, twin-jet all-weather design by CAC.

Hawker Aircraft also submitted a proposal, for a swept-wing, swept-tail fighter based on the Hawker P.1052, but using a Rolls-Royce Tay engine. Work began to modify the second prototype of the P.1052 (VX279) along these lines, although the Rolls-Royce Nene engine already fitted was initially retained. To allow an afterburner, the bifurcated tail-pipes of the P.1052 was replaced by a single tail-exit pipe.

VX279, which was now the prototype P.1081, took to the air on 19 June 1950. CAC, evidently planning to build any design accepted by the Australian government, assigned the serial number CA-24 to the P.1081.

By mid-1950, however, the RAAF urgently required a replacement for its Mustangs, some of which were in action in Korea and faced the possibility of clashes with MiG-15s. The P.1081 could not realistically become operational for at least a few years, so a ready-made fighter was required. While the North American F-86 Sabre was operational with the US Air Force in Korea, the USAF had complete priority and the F-86 could not be delivered to the RAAF for at least a few years. (After the war, CAC in Australia built a more powerful, Rolls-Royce Avon-engined variant of the F-86, known as the CAC Sabre.) To replace its Mustangs in Korea, the Australian government ordered the F.8 variant of the Gloster Meteor, which was already in service with the RAF.

In November 1950, evidently anticipating that orders for the P.1081 would not eventuate, Hawker decided to cease development. The prototype, which had remained in the UK, was handed over by Hawker to the Royal Aircraft Establishment (RAE). Its swept tail increased the Mach number above that of the P.1052 into the Mach 0.9-0.95 region, providing valuable data that contributed to the design of the axially-powered Hawker Hunter.

On 3 April 1951, the P.1081 prototype was lost with its pilot, Squadron Leader T. S. "Wimpy" Wade.

== Operators ==
United Kingdom

- Royal Aircraft Establishment

== Specifications ==
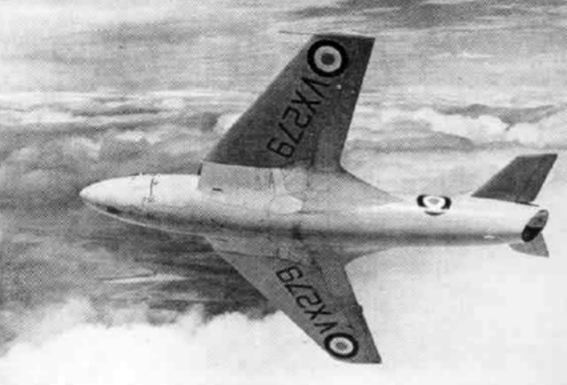
The Hawker P.1081 breaking right, in 1950.

Data from Hawker Aircraft since 1920

General characteristics

- Crew: 1
- Length: 37 ft 4 in (11.38 m)
- Wingspan: 31 ft 6 in (9.60 m)
- Height: 10 ft 10 in (3.30 m)
- Wing area: 258 sq ft (24.0 m^{2})
- Empty weight: 11,200 lb (5,080 kg)
- Gross weight: 14,480 lb (6,568 kg)
- Powerplant: 1 × Rolls-Royce RN.2 Nene centrifugal-flow turbojet engine, 5,000 lbf (22 kN) thrust

Performance

- Maximum speed: 695.9 mph (1,119.9 km/h, 604.7 kn)
- Service ceiling: 45,600 ft (13,900 m)

== See also ==
Related development

- Hawker P.1052
