= Hawker Sea Hawk =

1947 fighter aircraft family by Hawker

Sea Hawk
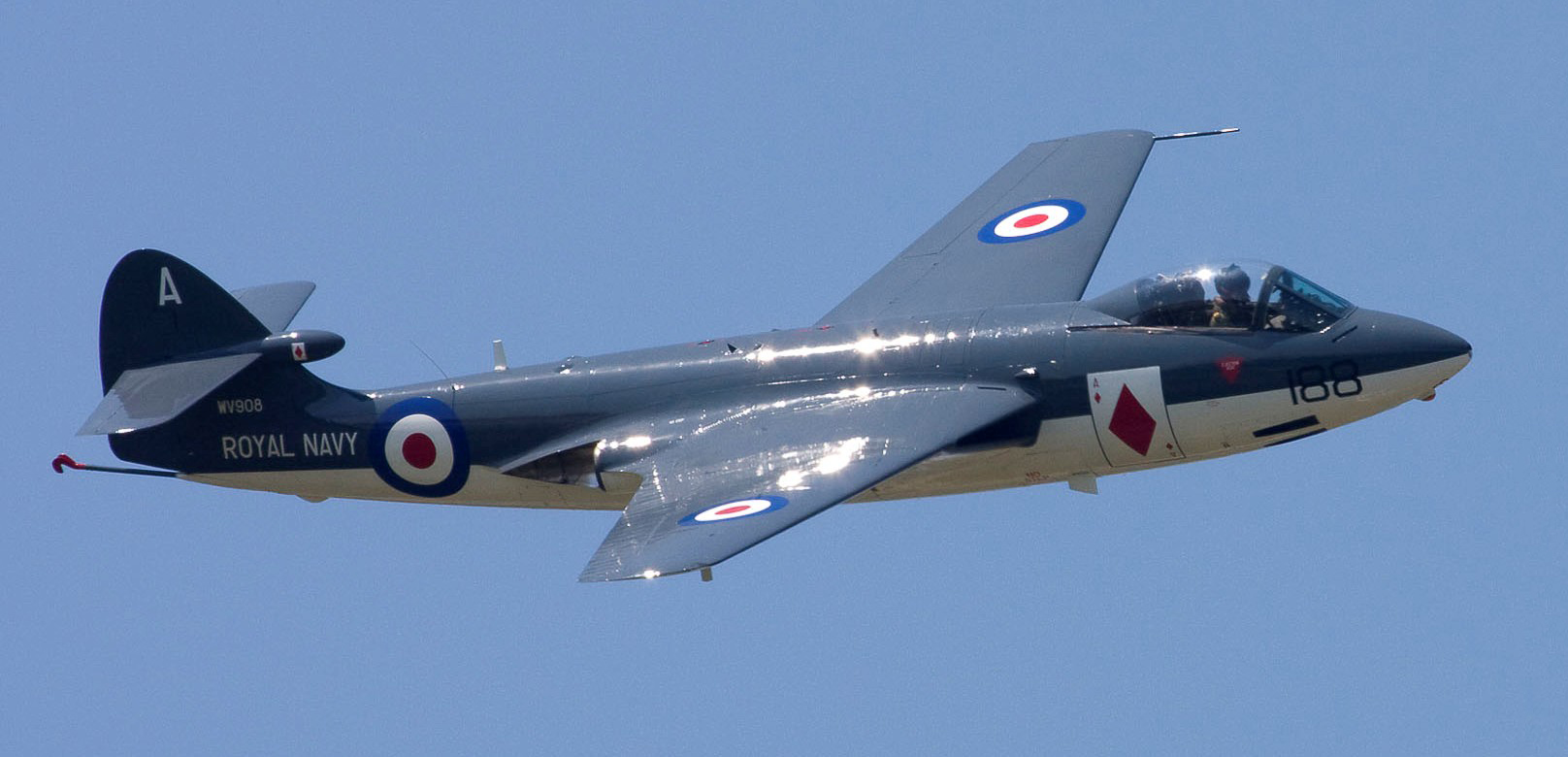
- A former Royal Navy Sea Hawk WV 908 as a warbird

General information
- Type: Naval fighter
- National origin: United Kingdom
- Manufacturer: Hawker Aircraft; Armstrong Whitworth Aircraft
- Designer: Sydney Camm
- Primary users: Royal Navy (historical) Indian Navy (historical); German Navy (historical); Royal Netherlands Navy (historical)
- Number built: 542

History
- Introduction date: March 1953
- First flight: 2 September 1947
- Retired: 1983
- Variants: Hawker P.1052; Hawker P.1072

The Hawker Sea Hawk is a British single-seat jet day fighter formerly of the Fleet Air Arm (FAA), the air branch of the Royal Navy (RN), built by Hawker Aircraft and its sister company, Armstrong Whitworth Aircraft. Although its design originated from earlier Hawker piston-engined fighters, the Sea Hawk was the company's first jet aircraft.

Following acceptance in the RN, the Sea Hawk proved to be a reliable and sturdy workhorse. A considerable number were also produced for the export market and were operated from aircraft carriers in Dutch and Indian service. The last operational Sea Hawks, operated by the Indian Navy, were retired in 1983.

== Design and development ==
=== Origins ===
Towards the end of the Second World War, Hawker's design team had become increasingly interested in developing a fighter aircraft that took advantage of the newly developed jet propulsion technology. Prior to this, Hawker had been committed until late 1944 to the production and further development of its piston-powered aircraft, such as the Hurricane, Tempest and Typhoon, to meet the wartime demands for these aircraft. On 1 September 1944, the first prototype of the company's latest fighter aircraft, the Hawker Fury/Sea Fury, conducted its maiden flight; it was this aircraft that would serve as the basis for Hawker's first jet-powered aircraft.

The design team studied the potential adaption of the aircraft, having opted to use the Rolls-Royce Griffon-powered Fury prototype as the starting point. The team started with the deletion of the piston engine, with its replacement, a single Rolls-Royce Nene turbojet engine, being fitted in a mid-fuselage position, along with lateral air intakes and a tailpipe which emerged beneath the tailplane. The prospective modifications also included "stretching" the fuselage and moving the cockpit to the extreme front of the fuselage in a re-contoured nose; this design received the internal designation P.1035. Use of the Rolls-Royce Derwent engine had been studied but quickly discarded as lacking power for an aircraft of this size. In November 1944 the P.1035 design was submitted for evaluation by the Air Ministry.

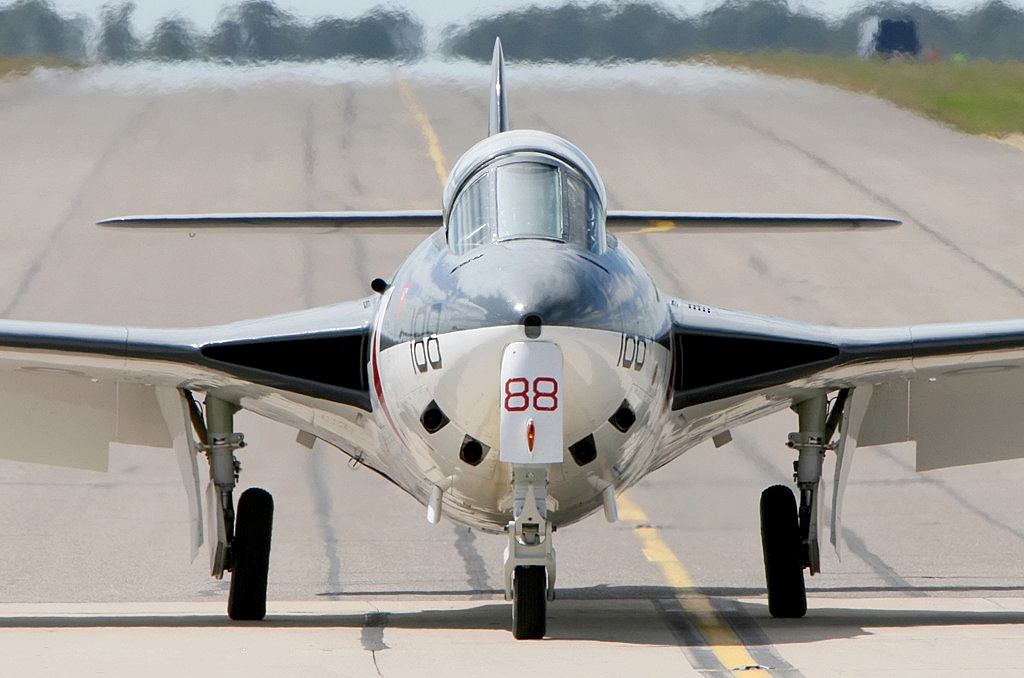
View showing wing root air intakes on a production aircraft

In December 1944 Hawker refined the proposed design substantially. The jet exhaust was moved from beneath the tail and re-designed as two short split-lateral bifurcated exhausts (which gained the name "trouser legs"), embedded in the trailing edge of the wing root, which needed a corresponding thickening of the wing root; the air intakes were moved to the wing root leading edge, similar to the contemporary de Havilland Vampire. The shorter unusual bifurcated jet pipe reduced pressure losses in the jet pipe and had the additional advantage of freeing up space in the rear fuselage for fuel tanks, which gave the aircraft a longer range than many other early jets. The absence of wing fuel tanks also meant a thinner wing could be adopted without the penalty of reduced range; to ease manufacture, the elliptical wingform of the Fury was discarded in favour of a straight tapered wing design. The fuselage fuel tanks, being fore and aft of the engine, also provided for a stable centre of gravity during flight. The tail plane was raised to clear the jet exhausts. The Sea Hawk also featured a nose wheel undercarriage arrangement, the first for a Hawker-built aircraft. The aircraft was built to accommodate four 20mm Hispano-Suiza Mk. V cannon.

The redesign had led to a new name for the project, P.1040. The Air Ministry quickly issued its encouragement for Hawker's development of the project but according to aviation author Francis K. Mason, the Air Ministry and the Admiralty had initially viewed the project with only academic interest. Official interest had also cooled by the expression of doubts voiced by Rolls-Royce Limited on the viability of the bifurcated jet pipes that the design used. Like the piston-powered Fury it had been derived from, Hawker remained keen to promote the P.1040 to the Royal Air Force (RAF) and to the Navy. The P.1040 was intended to be an interceptor, even though a top speed of only 600 mph was forecast. Shortly following the end of the war, the RAF decided to cancel several large orders for Hawker's piston-powered aircraft and to announce that the service would be taking no further interest in the P.1040 proposals.

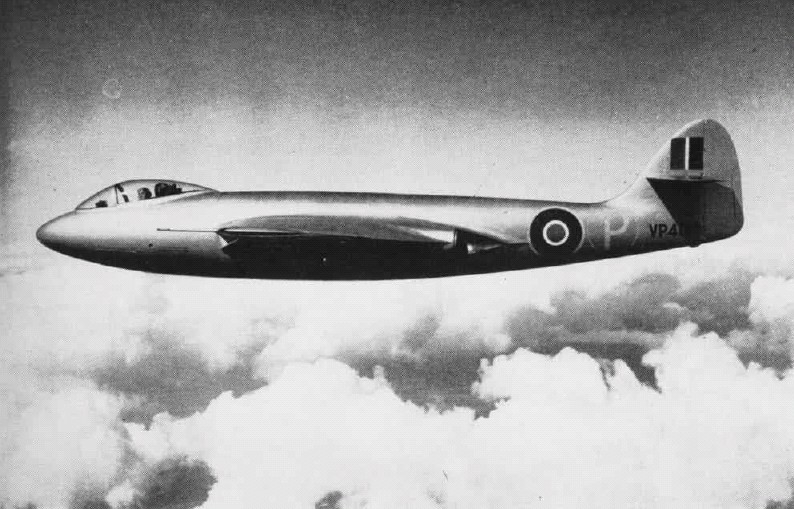
The P.1040 prototype VP401, circa 1947-1948

Hawker elected to refine the P.1040 design as a private venture, albeit being prepared with a view for service with British military customers in mind. In October 1945, Sydney Camm, Hawker's chief designer, being satisfied with the results generated from engineering mock-ups and wind tunnel testing, authorised a production order for a prototype by the company's experimental department. In light of the diminished RAF interest in the project, allegedly due to the aircraft offering insufficient advances over the jet fighters that were already in service, such as the Gloster Meteor and de Havilland Vampire, in January 1946, a naval version of the P.1040 was offered by Hawker to the Admiralty as a fleet support fighter, as the P.1046.

The Admiralty was not enthusiastic, in part due to the development of the jet-powered Supermarine Attacker aircraft. The service was however intrigued by the long-range of the P.1040 and the promise of increased power from the Nene engine. In May 1946, the Naval Staff authorised the manufacture of three prototypes and a further test specimen, one of these being the original prototype internally ordered by Hawker, in accordance with Naval Specification N.7/46. Hawker quickly found their development focus for the type being divided between the naval P.1046 and the general-purpose P.1040, which was still hoped to be viable as an RAF fighter. The P.1040 would lead to the eventual development of the land-based swept wing Hawker Hunter fighter. Swept wing versions (P.1052 and P.1081) were built and experience gained with these were instrumental in developing the design of the Hunter.

=== Prototypes ===
On 2 September 1947, the P.1040 prototype, VP401, sometimes referred to as the Hawker N.7/46 after the related naval specification, conducted its maiden flight from RAF Boscombe Down, piloted by Bill Humble. Three days later, VP401 flew to Farnborough to continue trials. A month after the first flight, the existence of the P.1040 was revealed to the general public. Early flight trials encountered aerodynamically related teething problems, such as airframe vibrations and tail buffeting, which led to a redesign of the rear jet pipe fairings and the addition of a bullet-shaped anti-shock body on the tail. Other minor issues were addressed, including high stick forces and windscreen distortion; VP401 needed long take-off runs which were attributed to the "low-thrust" Nene 1. The Nene 2/Mk.101 for production aircraft would have a higher take-off thrust.

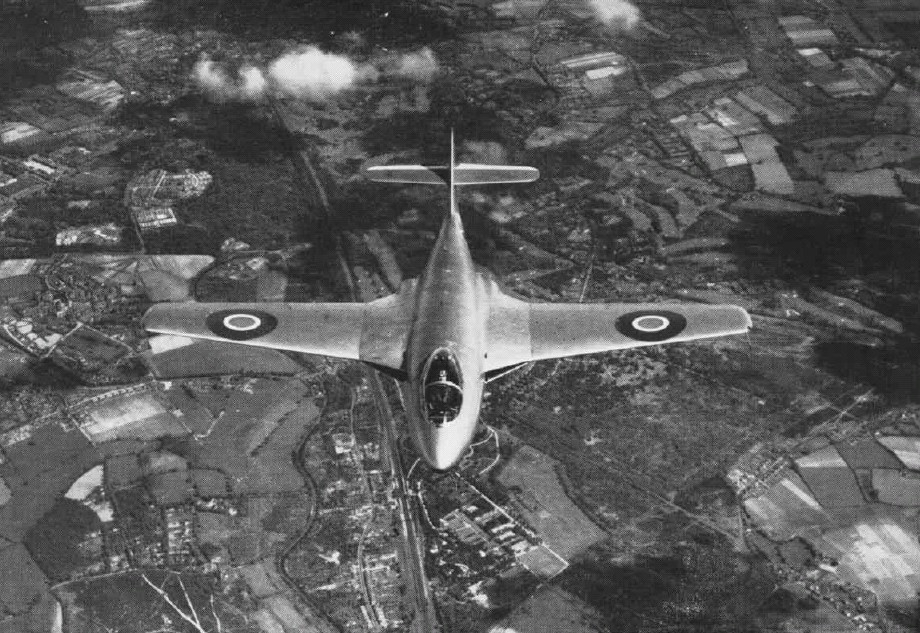
Forward view of a P.1040 prototype VP401, 1947–1948

On 31 August 1948, a naval prototype, VP413, equipped with folding wings, catapult spools and armament, conducted its first flight. VP413 was quickly subjected to a series of deck assessment trials using a mock-up deck at Boscombe Down. In April 1949, VP413 was transferred to the aircraft carrier HMS Illustrious to conduct general deck and handling trials at sea. These trials revealed the need for the wing span to be increased by 30 inches, the low-speed handling of the prototype having been found to be lacking. In November 1949, VP413 returned to Illustrious, performing around 25 deck landings without issue.

On 17 October 1949, the third prototype, VP422, made its maiden flight. Being representative of the production aircraft, VP422 incorporated a number of modifications as a result of experience gained from trials with the second prototype, these alterations included the fitting of a longer arrester hook when a number of "bolters" were experienced during the early dummy deck trials. After the longer hook was incorporated, this modification was carried though the remaining production runs. Other changes included the addition of fixtures for rocket-assisted take-off gear (RATOG) and hard points plumbed for external drop tanks. On 22 November 1949, Hawker received an initial production contract for 151 aircraft named Sea Hawk. Throughout 1950, both VP413 and VP422 were used for preliminary service trials.

VP422, the third prototype, later joined a specially-prepared Vampire Mk 21 in testing the feasibility of operating without an undercarriage, using a flexible deck. Flying from Farnborough, VP413 made the only flight with undercarriage raised from catapult launch to arrested landing on 12 November 1953. This flight was the final phase of the flexible deck project and was the only launch of an aircraft from the slotted tube catapult developed from the slotted tube launchers used for the V-1 flying bomb. Although the trials were successful, the project was abandoned when the introduction of more powerful engines obviated the need radically to adapt the design to the concept of combat aircraft without undercarriages.

VP401, the first prototype, had continued to serve in the flight test programme and was involved in two significant events prior to its retirement. On 1 August 1949, the Royal Navy entered VP401 in the National Air Races, in which it won the Society of British Aircraft Constructors (SBAC) Challenge Cup Race, beating a Vampire 3 and de Havilland DH.108. VP401 was later converted into a further prototype, the Hawker P.1072, the principal addition being in the form of an auxiliary rocket engine; configured as such, it became the first British rocket-powered aircraft. After a few flights were made in 1950, the rocket engine blew up during a test and although repaired, the airframe was scrapped soon after.

=== Production ===
Immediately following the receipt of the first order in November 1949, Hawker set about establishing a manufacturing line for the Sea Hawk at their Kingston facility. Shortly after the outbreak of the Korean War, an urgent operational demand for aircraft carriers and aircraft became apparent. The rate of production was substantially increased and more orders for the Sea Hawk were placed. The issuing of a 'Super-Priority' status for the Sea Hawk by Prime Minister Winston Churchill in 1951, served to speed up production considerably as well as aid the supply of vital materials for its manufacture.

To cope with demand, address production shortcomings and cope with the parallel pressure that Hawker was facing for the development of another aircraft, the newer Hunter, it was decided that production would be transferred to a new assembly line run by Armstrong Whitworth Aircraft, part of the Hawker group, at Coventry. Prior to the transfer, 35 Sea Hawk F1, the initial production standard, were completed at Kingston. On 14 November 1951, the first production Sea Hawk F1, WF143, conducted its maiden flight. It possessed a 39 ft (12 m) wingspan and a tailplane of increased area. The first Coventry-built Sea Hawk F1 made its first flight prior to the end of 1953; a total of 60 would be produced.

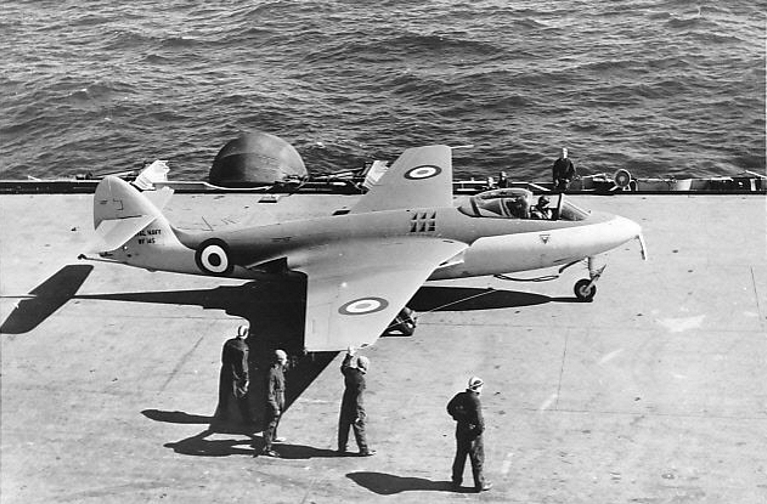
A Sea Hawk F1, WF145, aboard the aircraft carrier HMS Eagle, 1952

While some of the initial batch of Sea Hawks would see operational service, many of the F1s would be used for various service trials. Amongst these, WF143 would later be rebuilt as the prototype for the Sea Hawk F2, featuring power-assisted ailerons in place of their unpowered counterparts on the F1, to which flight trials had demonstrated a weakness in lateral control leading to instances of oscillation. On 24 February 1954, the first production Sea Hawk F2, WF240, conducted its maiden flight at Bitteswell. A total of 40 F2 aircraft would be produced.

Another Sea Hawk F1, WF157, was developed into a prototype for the FB 3 standard, the initial fighter bomber variant of the type and later most common of the Sea Hawk variants. To suit this role, much of the development work went into its range of external stores, although the clearance of these for service was disrupted by a lack of Royal Navy personnel. On 13 March 1954, the first production Sea Hawk FB 3, WF280, made its first flight. A more refined Sea Hawk FGA 4 variant followed, partially to remedy stores handling problems that had been experienced with the FB 3 variant; the first FB 4 aircraft, WV792 conducted its first flight on 26 August 1954.

In 1950, it was acknowledged that the Nene 101 engine was transitional powerplant; upon availability of the 4 per cent more powerful Nene 103, the Admiralty quickly ordered many of its Sea Hawk FB 3 and FGA 4 to be re-engined. Another two Sea Hawk variants were developed; the first of these, the FB 5, was more or less identical to the FB 3 apart from the newer, more powerful Nene 103 engine, which greatly improving the aircraft's low-speed handling and take-off performance. The final Sea Hawk standard, FGA 6, was a fighter ground-attack variant, the same as its FB 5 predecessor, though they were new-build aircraft rather than re-engined ones. A total of just under 90 FGA 6s were completed.

== Design ==
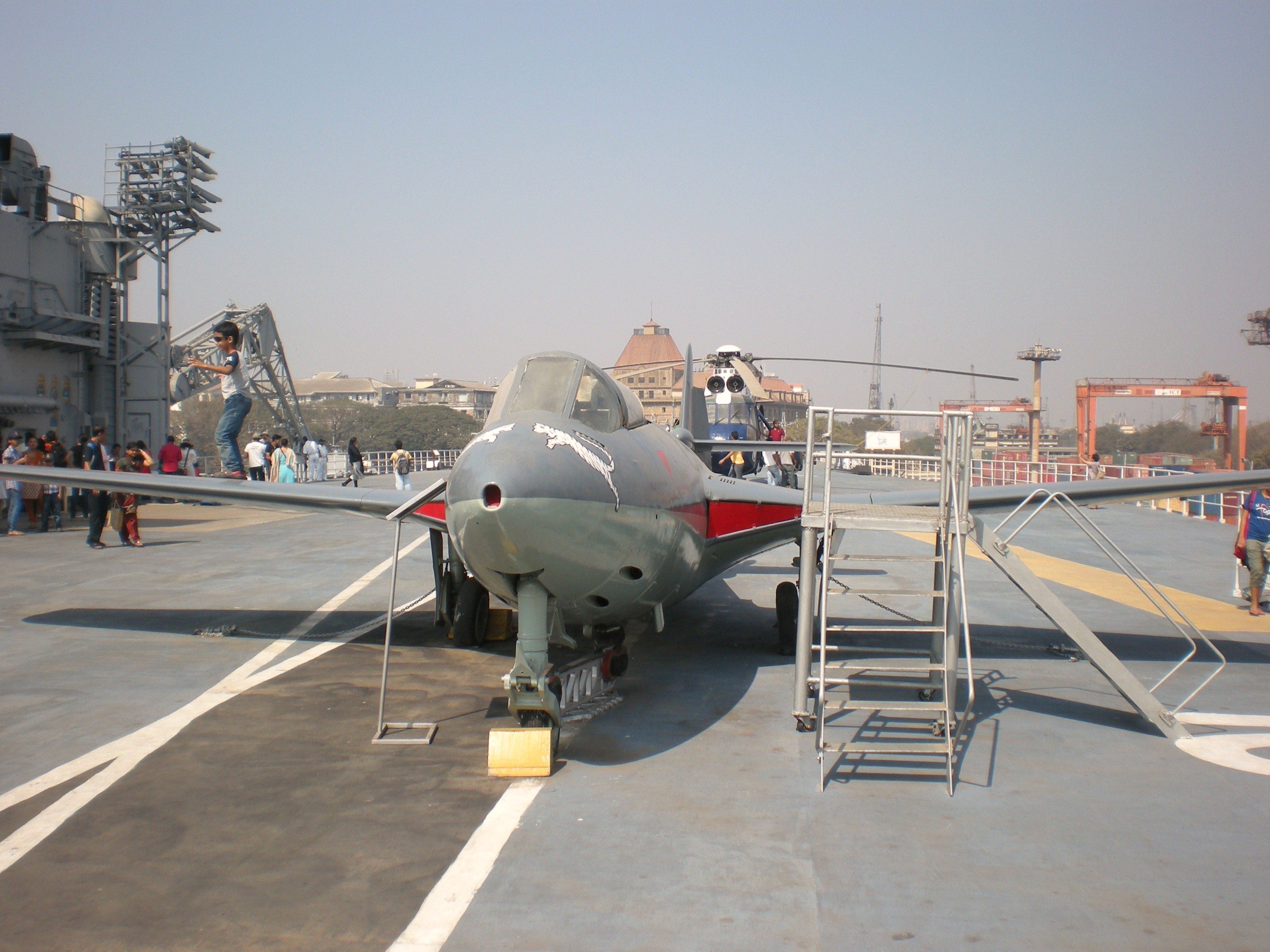
An Indian Sea Hawk on the flight deck of INS Vikrant

The F 1 was armed with four 20 mm (.79 in) Hispano Mk V cannons. It was powered by a 5,000 lbf (22 kN) thrust Rolls-Royce Nene 101 centrifugal flow turbojet engine. The Nene engine was viewed as underpowered; in 1950, the government had cancelled development of the Rolls-Royce Tay, an afterburner-equipped development of the Nene, leaving no more powerful engines to equip the Sea Hawk. More minor developments of the Nene engine were developed and were adopted on the aircraft, providing for some increase in power.

The F 1 had a maximum speed of 599 mph (964 km/h) at sea level and a range of 800 mi (1,287 km) on internal fuel. A more refined fighter variant was the F 2, which introduced power-boosted aileron controls as well as other modifications, including to its structure. The next variant of the Sea Hawk was developed into a fighter-bomber, the FB 3, and differed only slightly from its predecessors; its structure being strengthened to allow it to carry a wider array of equipment and weaponry on its four hard points, these included rockets, bombs, napalm, mines, reconnaissance cameras, external drop tanks and fixtures for RATOG.

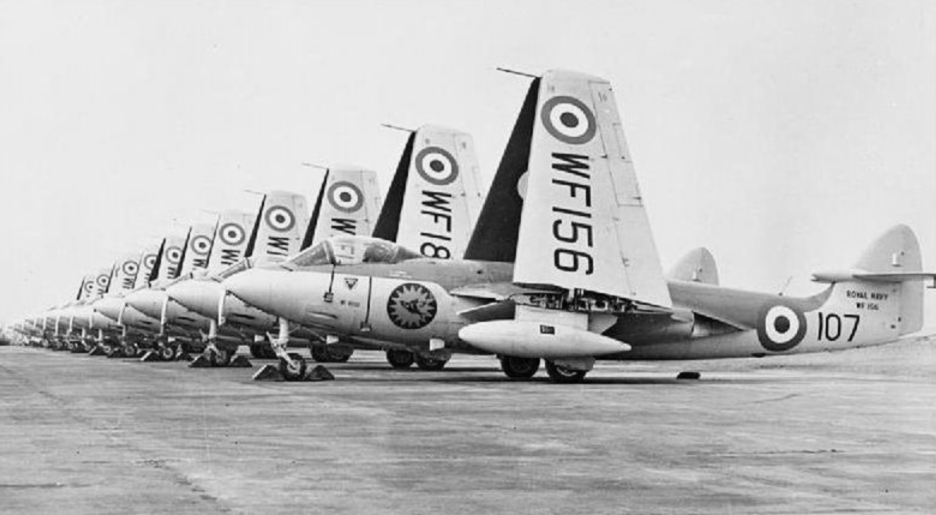
Sea Hawks of 898 Squadron at RNAS Brawdy, in 1954.

Unlike its rival, the Supermarine Attacker, which had been the first jet aircraft to enter service with the FAA, the Sea Hawk had a tricycle undercarriage rather than a tail-wheel, making it easier to land on carriers, it was also Hawker's first aircraft to incorporate a nose-wheel undercarriage. The Sea Hawk had adopted a fairly conventional design, being built with straight wings while a number of other contemporary aircraft, such as the F-86 Sabre, had adopted swept wings. The Sea Hawk was a reliable and elegant aeroplane, though its cautious design meant it would only be attractive on the export market and be in production for only a short period before being superseded by more advanced aircraft.

== Operational history ==
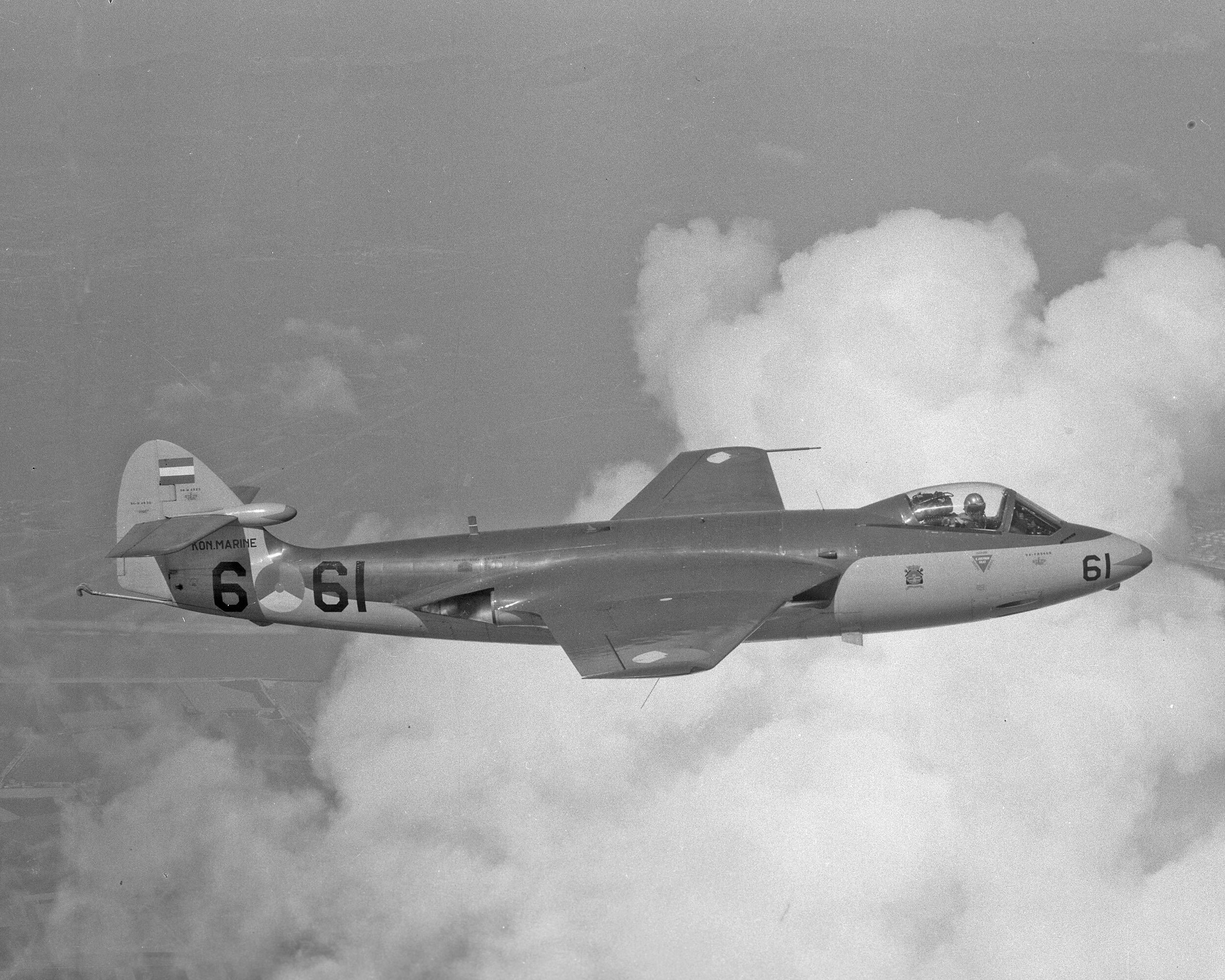
Royal Netherlands Navy Sea Hawk Mk 50

The first production Sea Hawk was the F 1, which first flew in 1951, entered service two years later with 806 Squadron, first based at Brawdy, then transferred to HMS Eagle. All Sea Hawks were in service by the mid-1950s and eventually over 500 were built.

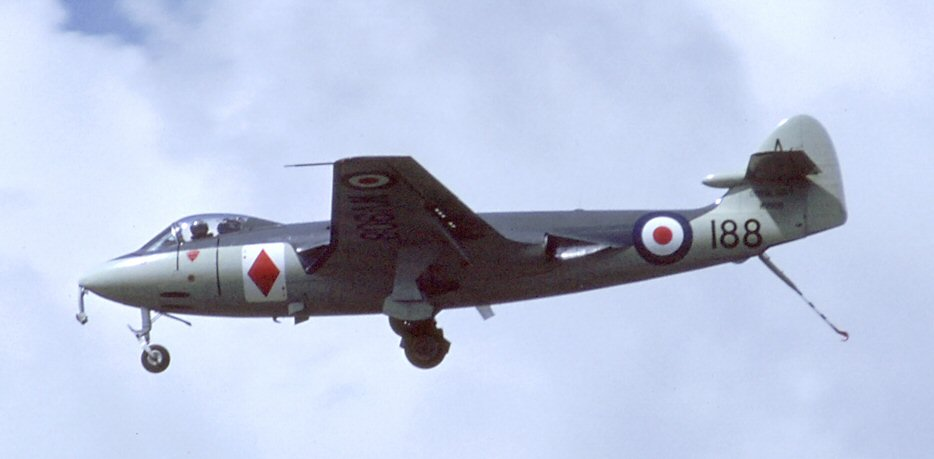
A Royal Navy Sea Hawk with Tailhook extended in 1985

During service evaluations of the Sea Hawk, Australian and Canadian naval pilots flew the aircraft leading to official suggestions that the aircraft would be chosen by the two countries. Both nations were also interested in new American-built naval aircraft; only a handful of Sea Hawks were transferred to either nation, some operating from the flight deck of the Australian Majestic-class aircraft carrier HMAS Sydney, though these did not enter full squadron service. In 1956, shortly after the termination of the Sea Hawk production line, the Federal Republic of Germany placed an order for 68 aircraft to equip the Bundesmarine, the West German navy, considering them good value for money. The Bundesmarine had a requirement for a day fighter-bomber and one with an all-weather capability; 34 aircraft of each variant were ordered, the Mk 100 limited to good weather, and the Mk 101 equipped with a pod-based EKCO-built search radar for sea reconnaissance in all weathers. The German Sea Hawks served into the mid-1960s, until replaced by the F-104 Starfighter.

The Netherlands placed an order for 30 aircraft, as the Sea Hawk Mk 50, a ground-attack variant for the Royal Netherlands Navy, which was financed by NATO funding. The Mk 50 was externally similar to the Royal Navy aircraft, differing in its use of a Philips-built ultra high frequency (UHF) radio; Dutch Sea Hawks were later equipped to each carry a pair of AIM-9 Sidewinder infrared-guided air-to-air missiles. Between 1957 and 1964, the Dutch Navy operated 22 aircraft. The last export customer was India which ordered 24 new Sea Hawks and 12 refurbished ex-FAA Mk 6s in 1959, following up with 30 additional airframes reconstructed from West German stocks, among others.

=== Combat record ===
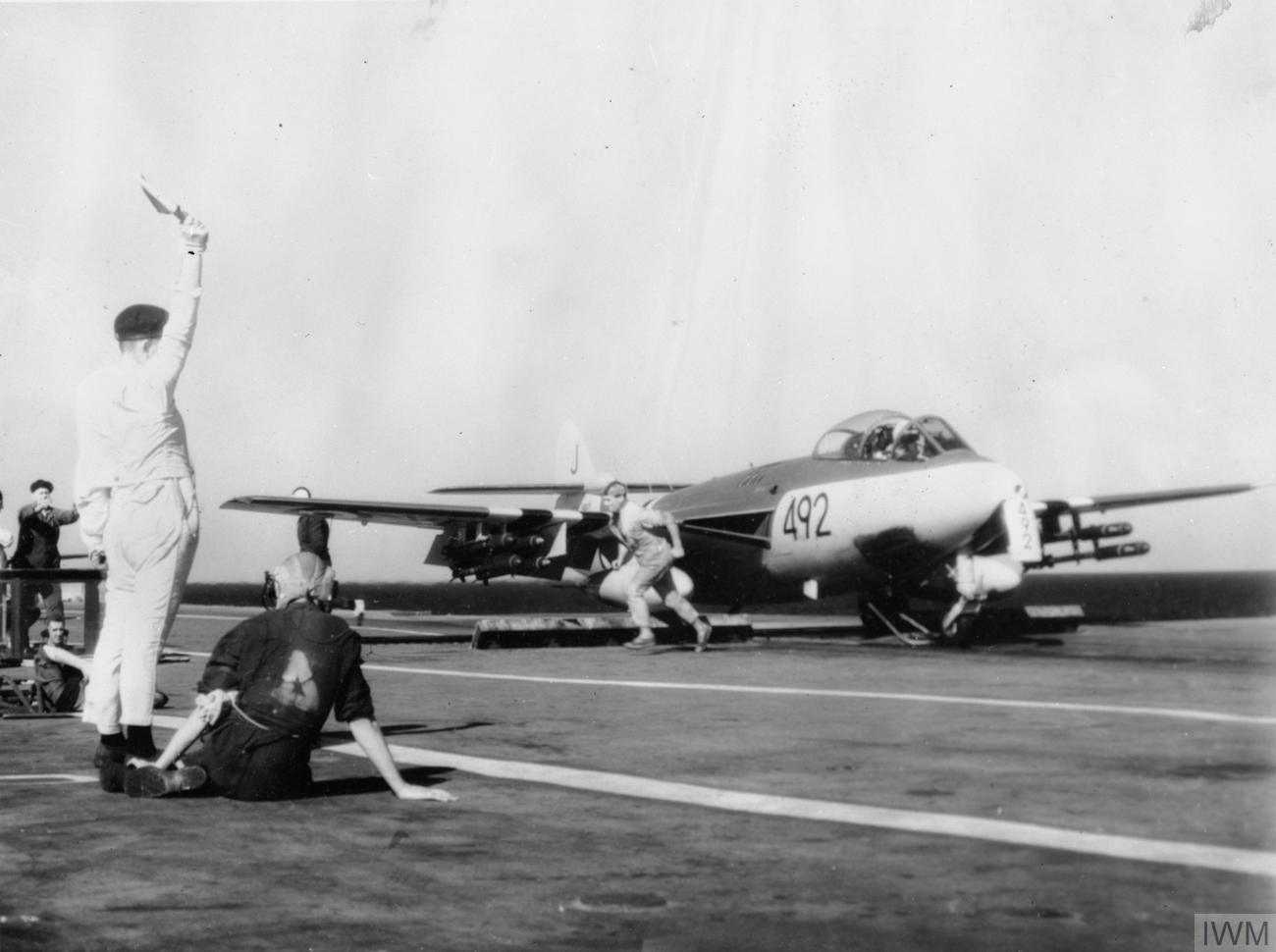
A Sea Hawk of 899 Squadron on HMS Eagle during the Suez Crisis.

The Sea Hawk saw extensive service during the Suez Crisis, when joint Anglo-French forces invaded Egypt on 31 October 1956 in Operation Musketeer. Six Sea Hawk squadrons took part, two aboard the fleet carrier HMS Eagle and two each aboard the light fleet carriers HMS Albion and HMS Bulwark. The Sea Hawks were primarily used for ground attack. Due to aircraft such as the Hunter lacking the range or clearance to deliver munitions, the British ground attack capability during the conflict comprised the navy Sea Hawks and the Westland Wyverns of 830 Squadron, typically being escorted by de Havilland Sea Venom fighters.

Sea Hawks launched many attacks upon Egyptian shore-based targets, often against massed anti-aircraft fire, resulting in several aircraft being severely damaged. The Suez Crisis was to be the last Sea Hawk combat operation with the Royal Navy, as new strike aircraft such as the de Havilland Sea Vixen and the Supermarine Scimitar were introduced after the conflict.

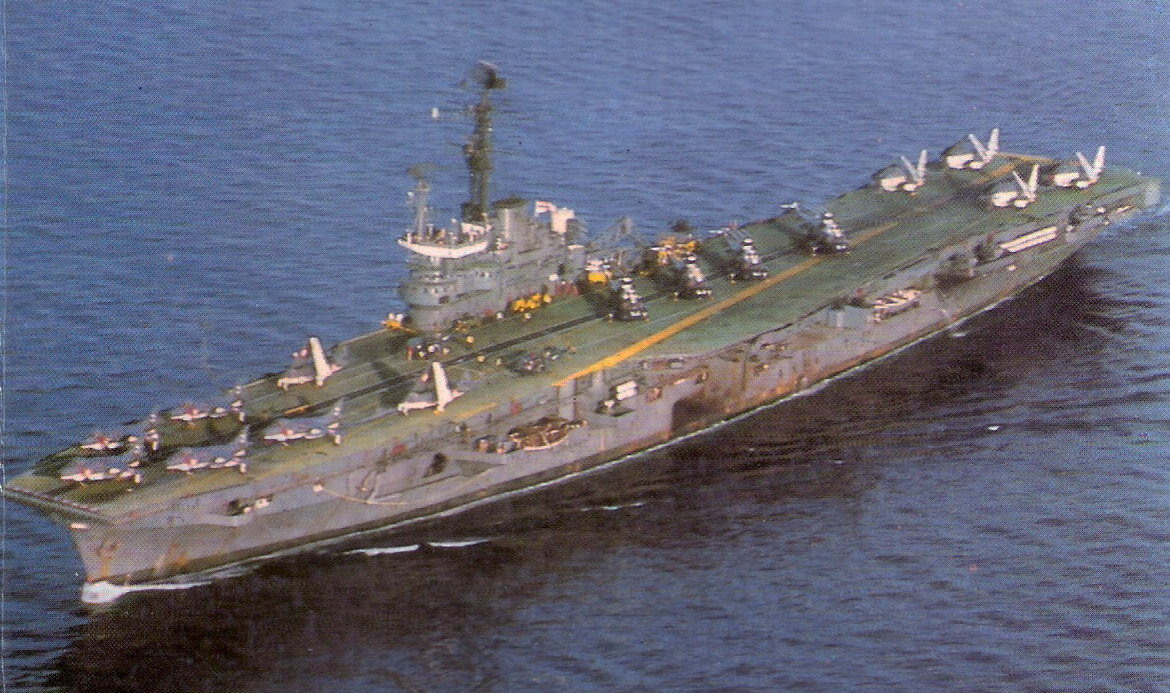
The Indian aircraft carrier INS Vikrant in the early 1980s, carrying Sea Hawks, Sea Harriers, Alouette and Sea King helicopters and Alizé ASW aircraft.

In the Royal Netherlands Navy, the Sea Hawk served aboard the Dutch aircraft carrier HNLMS Karel Doorman, ex-HMS Venerable, including the decolonization operations guarding against Indonesian threats in the area. From 1959 they were equipped with Sidewinder missiles significantly enhancing their air-to-air combat capabilities. In 1961, the Sea Hawks that served on her were moved ashore when the Dutch commitment to NATO was changed to maritime patrol using ASW aircraft; by October 1964 they had been taken out of service.

In Indian Navy service (beginning in 1960) Sea Hawks were used aboard the aircraft carrier INS Vikrant, ex-HMS Hercules and saw service during the Indo-Pakistani War of 1965 and the Indo-Pakistani War of 1971. In the latter war, Sea Hawks sank about a dozen vessels, comprising Pakistan Navy gunboats and cargo ships, in East Pakistan waters (now Bangladesh) without losing an aircraft. They were supported by Breguet Alizé aircraft which sank three gunboats. The Sea Hawk was withdrawn from Indian Navy service in 1983, being replaced by the far more capable BAE Sea Harrier.

=== Retirement ===
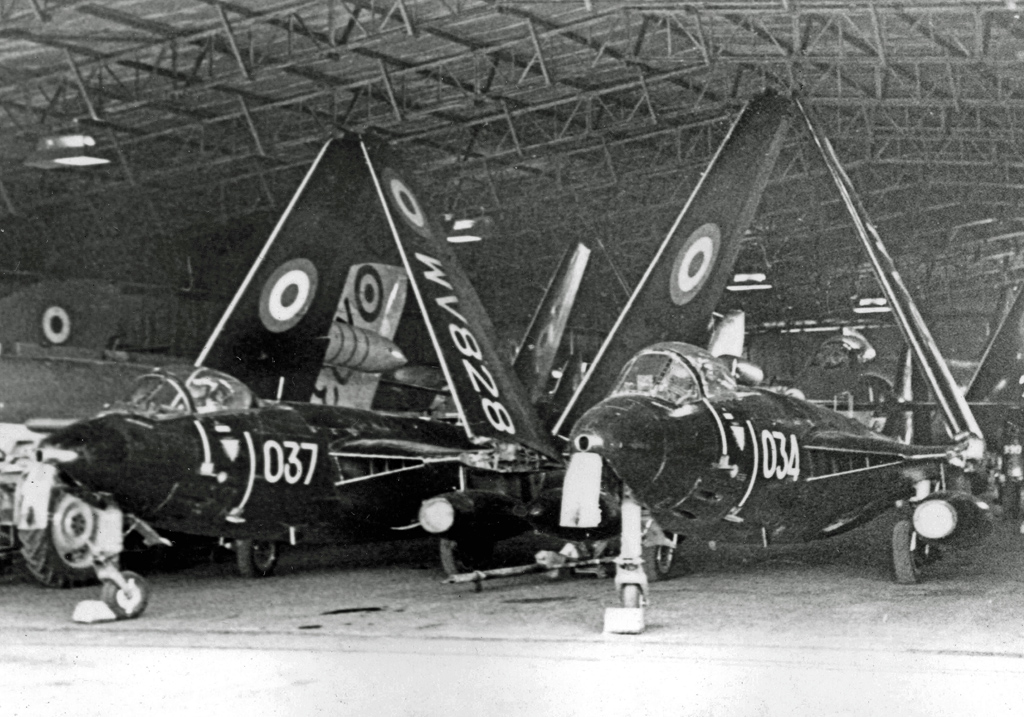
Two Sea Hawk FGA.6 of the Fleet Requirements Unit at Bournemouth (Hurn) Airport in 1967

The Sea Hawks in Fleet Air Arm service began being removed from first line service in 1958, the year in which the Supermarine Scimitar and de Havilland Sea Vixen entered service, both of which types would eventually replace the Sea Hawk. The last front line Sea Hawk squadron, No. 806, disbanded at RNAS Brawdy on 15 December 1960, ending a very brief operational career for the Sea Hawk. Most Sea Hawks in second line service were withdrawn by the mid-1960s. The last operational Royal Navy Sea Hawks were FGA.6 flown by the Airwork Limited managed "black" Fleet Requirements Unit based at Bournemouth (Hurn) Airport which retired the type in 1969.

== Variants ==
P.1040

- VP401 prototype first flown at Boscombe Down on 2 September 1947, later converted to a P.1072
- VP413 navalised prototype to specification N.7/46 first flown at Farnborough 3 September 1948.
- VP422 second-naval prototype first flown at Farnborough 17 October 1949.

Sea Hawk F1
Production fighters powered by a Rolls-Royce Nene Mk 101 engine; 95 built (35 by Hawker Aircraft at Kingston upon Thames, the remainder and all subsequent production by Armstrong Whitworth Aircraft at Baginton, Coventry)
Sea Hawk F2
Production fighter with powered ailerons; 40 built by Armstrong Whitworth.
Sea Hawk FB 3
Fighter-bomber variant with stronger wing for external stores; 116 built.
Sea Hawk FGA 4
Fighter/Ground attack variant; 97 built.
Sea Hawk FB 5
FB3 fitted with the Nene Mk 103; 50 conversions.
Sea Hawk FGA 6
FGA4 with the Nene Mk 103; total of 101 (86 new-build, the remainder converted from FB3 and FGA 4 examples).
Sea Hawk Mk 50
Export variant based on the FGA 6 for the Royal Netherlands Navy; 22 built.
Sea Hawk Mk 100
Export variant for the West German Navy, similar to FGA 6 but fitted with taller fin and rudder; 32 built
Sea Hawk Mk 101
All-weather export variant for the West German Navy, as Mk 100 but fitted with a search radar in an underwing pod; 32 built.

== Operators ==
- West Germany
- India
- Netherlands
- United Kingdom

== Surviving aircraft ==
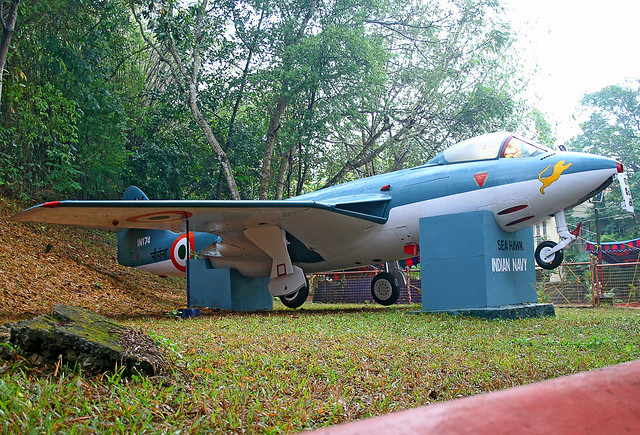
A Sea Hawk on static display at Jawahar BalBhavan, Trivandrum

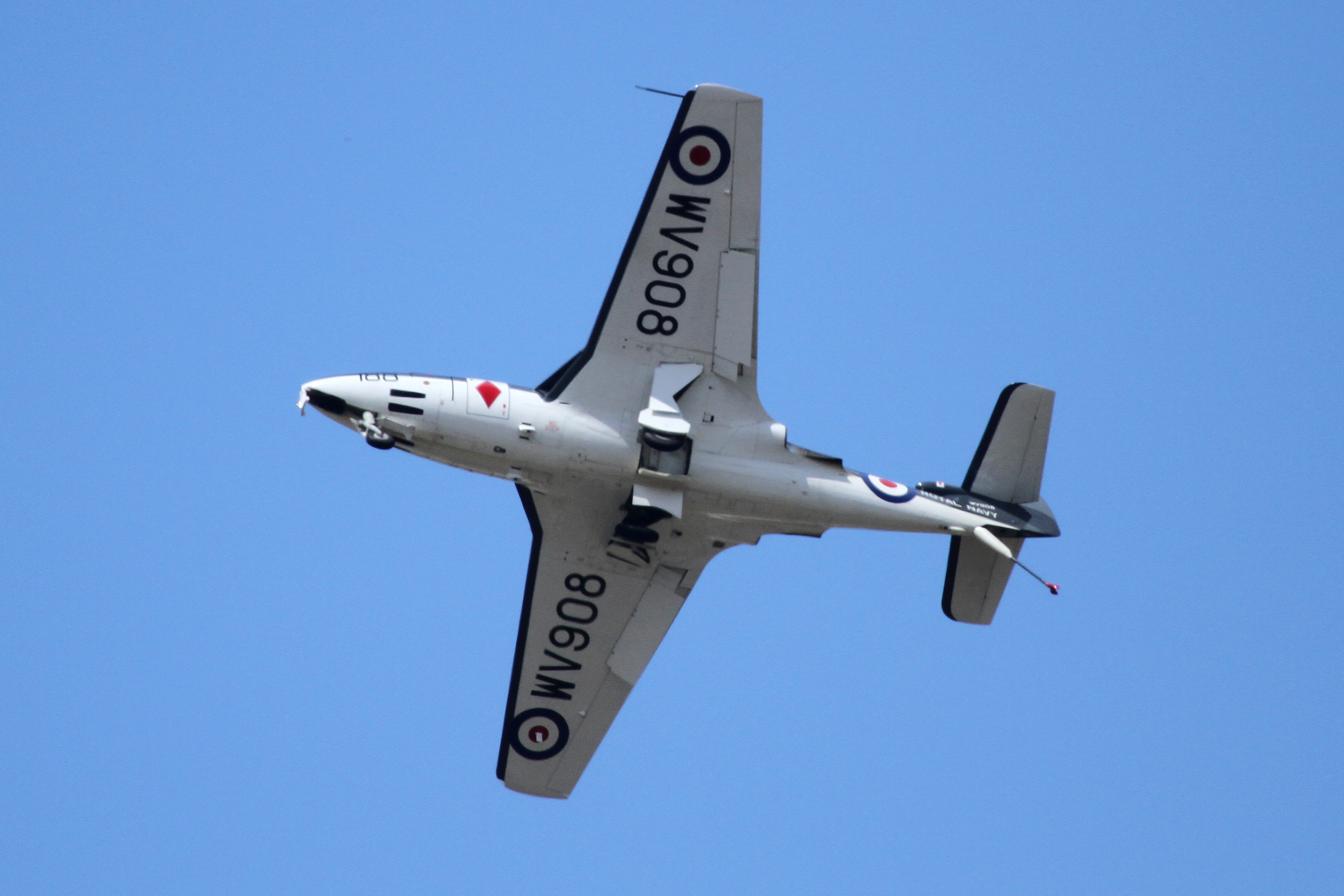
WV908 in flight, 2010

WV908 on landing approach

Thirty-six complete Sea Hawks (plus eight cockpit sections) are known to survive as of 2011, mainly in a variety of locations in the United Kingdom, though others are located abroad, including in Germany, Malta, the Netherlands and India. One Sea Hawk, WV908, remained airworthy as part of the Royal Navy Historic Flight until 2010. In June 2022, it was announced that, after several years in storage at RAF Shawbury, WV908 would be restored to flying condition at Yeovilton.

- WF225 (Sea Hawk F 1) is displayed as 'gate guardian' at RNAS Culdrose (HMS Seahawk), England.
- WF259 (Sea Hawk F 2) is stored at the National Museum of Flight, East Fortune, Scotland.
- WM913 (Sea Hawk FB 5) is displayed at the Newark Air Museum, Newark, England.
- WM961 (Sea Hawk FB 5) is displayed at Caernarfon Air World, Caernarfon, Wales.
- WM969 (Sea Hawk FB 5) is displayed in Hangar 3 at the Imperial War Museum, Duxford, England.
- WN108 (Sea Hawk FB 5) is displayed by the Ulster Aviation Society at Maze Long Kesh, Lisburn, Northern Ireland.
- WV797 (Sea Hawk FGA 6) is displayed at the Midland Air Museum, Coventry, England.
- WV826 (Sea Hawk FGA 6) is displayed at the Malta Aviation Museum, Ta'qali, Malta.
- WV856 (Sea Hawk FGA 6) is displayed at Fleet Air Arm Museum, Yeovilton, England.
- WV865 (Sea Hawk FGA 6) is displayed at the Luftwaffe Museum, Gatow, Germany.
- WV908 (Sea Hawk FGA 6) was airworthy with the Royal Navy Historic Flight, Yeovilton, England until 2010.
- XE327 (Sea Hawk FGA 6) is displayed at Hermeskeil, Germany.
- XE489 (Sea Hawk FGA 6) is displayed at the Gatwick Aviation Museum, Charlwood, England.
- XE368 (Sea Hawk FGA 6) is located on a private farm in Market Harborough pending restoration.
- 118 (Sea Hawk Mk 50) is displayed at De Kooy, the Netherlands.
- 131 (Sea Hawk Mk 50) is displayed at the Nationaal Militair Museum, Soesterberg, the Netherlands.
- IN-154 (Sea Hawk FGA 6) is displayed in INS Garuda Naval Air Station, Cochin, Kerala, India
- IN-172 (Sea Hawk FGA 6) is displayed in Cochin, Kerala, India.
- IN-174 (Sea Hawk FGA 6) is displayed at Jawahar Bal Bhavan, Museum Road, Trivandrum, Kerala, India.
- IN-188 (Sea Hawk FGA 6) was displayed at the INS Vikrant Museum, Mumbai, India. It is currently in storage.
- IN-195 (Sea Hawk FGA 6) is stored at INS Garuda Naval Air Station, Cochin, Kerala, India
- IN-231 (Sea Hawk Mk 100) is stored at INS Garuda Naval Air Station, Cochin, Kerala, India
- IN-234 (Sea Hawk Mk 100) is displayed at the Naval Aviation Museum, Goa, India
- IN-235 (Sea Hawk Mk 100) is displayed at the Aeronautical Engineering Dept at Indian Institute Of Technology - Madras, Chennai (Madras), Tamil Nadu, India
- IN-238 (Sea Hawk Mk.100) is displayed at Aeronauticum, Nordholz, Germany
- IN-240 (Sea Hawk Mk 100) is displayed at the Victory at Sea Memorial, Beach Road, Visakhapatnam, Andhra Pradesh, India.
- IN-244 (Sea Hawk Mk 100) is displayed as a gate guardian in front of the Naval Armament Depot in the town of Marmagoa, Goa, India
- IN-246 (Sea Hawk Mk 100) was displayed at the INS Vikrant Museum, Mumbai, India. It's currently in storage.
- IN-252 (Sea Hawk Mk 100) is displayed in the Aeronautical Engineering Dept at Madras Institute of Technology, Chennai (Madras), Tamil Nadu, India
- IN-xxx "Unknown Serial" is Displayed at National Defence Academy Khadakvasla, Pune, India.

== Specifications (Sea Hawk FGA.6) ==
Hawker Sea Hawk 3-view drawing

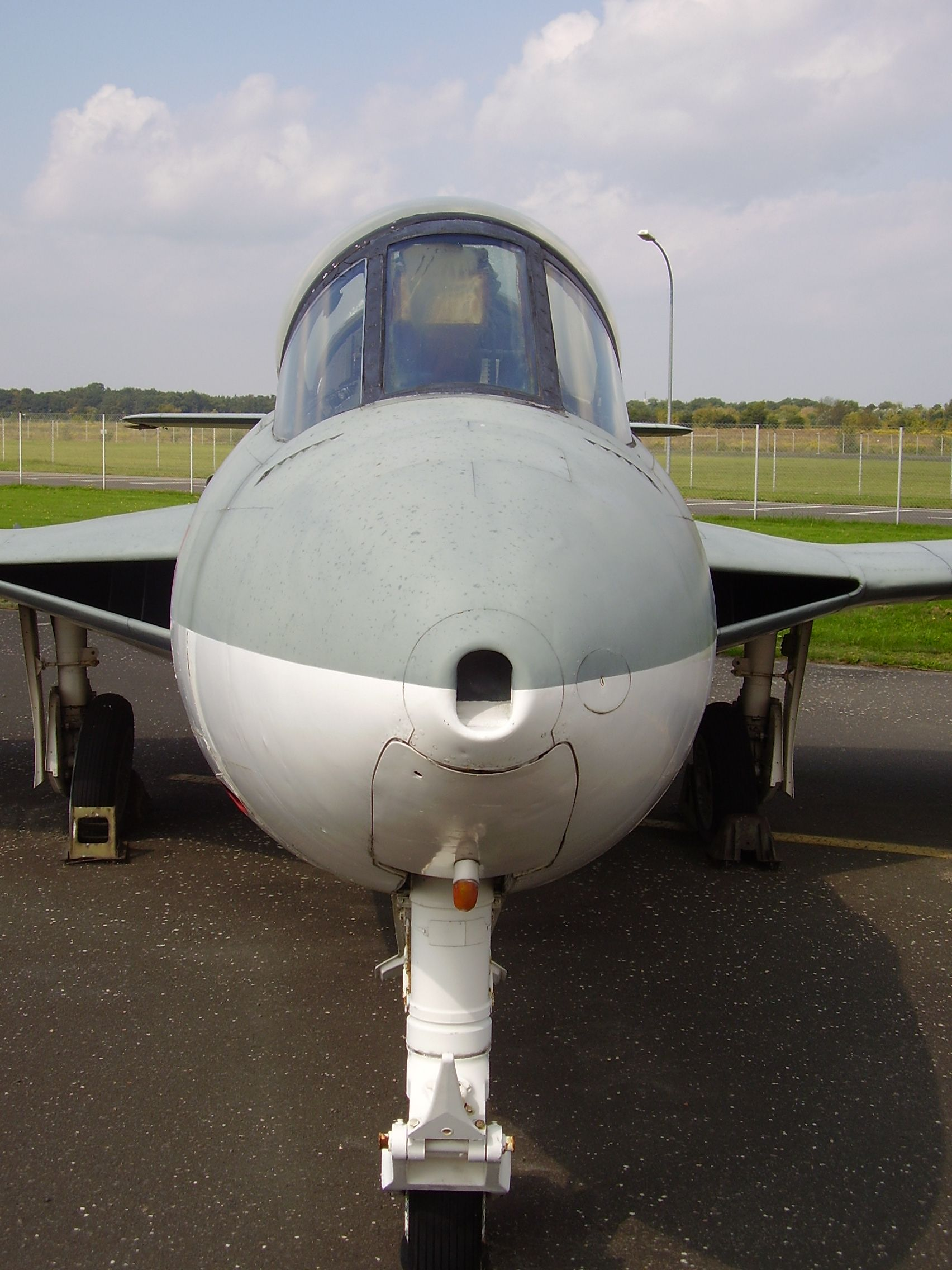
Head-on view of a Sea Hawk

Data from The Sea Hawk ...Epitome of Elegance, The Hawker Sea Hawk

General characteristics

- Crew: 1
- Length: 39 ft 8 in (12.09 m)
- Wingspan: 39 ft 0 in (11.89 m)
- Height: 8 ft 8 in (2.64 m)
- Wing area: 278 sq ft (25.8 m^{2})
- Empty weight: 9,278 lb (4,208 kg)
- Gross weight: 13,220 lb (5,996 kg)
- Max takeoff weight: 16,150 lb (7,326 kg)
- Powerplant: 1 × Rolls-Royce Nene 103 centrifugal-flow turbojet engine, 5,200 lbf (23 kN) thrust

Performance

- Maximum speed: 600 mph (970 km/h, 520 kn)
- Range: 480 mi (770 km, 420 nmi)
- Service ceiling: 44,500 ft (13,600 m)
- Rate of climb: 5,700 ft/min (29 m/s)
- Wing loading: 48 lb/sq ft (230 kg/m^{2})
- Power/mass: 0.38

Armament

- Guns: 4 × 20 mm (0.787 in) Hispano Mk.V cannon with 200 rpg
- Hardpoints: 6 underwing , with provisions to carry combinations of:
  - Rockets: 20 × RP-3 "60 lb" (27 kg) unguided rockets or 16 × .5 in (13 mm) unguided rockets
  - Bombs: 4 × 500 lb (230 kg) bombs
  - Other: or 2 × 90 imp gal (108 US gal; 409 L) drop-tanks

== See also ==
Related development

- Hawker P.1052
- Hawker P.1072
- Hawker P.1081

Aircraft of comparable role, configuration, and era

- de Havilland Vampire
- Dassault Ouragan
- Gloster Meteor
- Grumman F9F Panther
- McDonnell F2H Banshee
- Mikoyan-Gurevich MiG-15
- Mikoyan-Gurevich MiG-17
- North American FJ-1 Fury
- North American FJ-2/-3 Fury
- Republic F-84 Thunderjet
- Supermarine Attacker

Related lists

- List of aircraft of the Fleet Air Arm

== Notes ==
right
- Period footage of Sea Hawk operations on board HMS Eagle during the 1950s
- Video of a Sea Hawk performing an aerobatic display at Dunsford, 2008
- A Sea Hawk and Sea Fury of the Royal Navy Historic Flight

== Bibliography ==
- Badrocke, Mike. "Hawker's First Jet: Database, Hawker Sea Hawk." Aeroplane, September 2002.
- Brown, Eric, Captain. "The Sea Hawk ...Epitome of Elegance." Air International, Volume 23, no. 6, December 1982.
- Buttler, Tony. Hawker Sea Hawk (Warpaint No.29). Denbigh East, Bletchley, UK: Hall Park, 2001. ISSN 1363-0369.
- Buttler, Tony (2004). British Secret Projects. Midland Publishing. pp. 203–205. ISBN 1-85780-179-2.
- Green, William, ed. "Hawker Sea Hawk: Fighter A-Z." Air International, Volume 23, no. 1, July 1982.
- Green, William and Gordon Swanborough. The Great Book of Fighters. St. Paul, Minnesota: MBI Publishing, 2001. ISBN 0-7603-1194-3.
- Hannah, Donald. Hawker FlyPast Reference Library. Stamford, Lincolnshire, UK: Key Publishing Ltd., 1982. ISBN 0-946219-01-X.
- James, Derek N. Hawker, an Aircraft Album No.5. New York: Arco Publishing Company, 1973. ISBN 0-668-02699-5. (First published in the UK by Ian Allan in 1972)
- James, Derek N. "Type History: Database, Hawker Sea Hawk." Aeroplane, September 2002.
- Mason, Francis K. The British Fighter since 1912. London: Putnam, 1979. ISBN 0-85177-852-6.
- Mason, Francis K. Hawker Aircraft since 1920. London: Putnam, 1991. ISBN 0-85177-839-9.
- Mason, Francis K. The Hawker Sea Hawk. Leatherhead, Surrey, UK: Profile Publications Ltd., 1966.
- Ovčáčík, Michal and Karel Susa. Hawker Sea Hawk. Praha-Strašnice, Czech Republic: Mark I Ltd., 2001. ISBN 80-902559-3-0.
- Smith, John T. Wrath of a Mythical Monster: Westland Wyvern Operations in the Suez Campaign. Air Enthusiast No 74 Mar/Apr 1998.
- Taylor, John W.R. "Hawker Sea Hawk." Combat Aircraft of the World from 1909 to the present. New York: G.P. Putnam's Sons, 1969. ISBN 0-425-03633-2.
- Willis, Matthew (2017). "How to Build a Sea Hawk". The Aviation Historian (20): 56–63. ISSN 2051-1930.
- Wixey, Ken. "Sea Hawk" Aircraft Modelworld August 1985.
