= Bill Humble =

Pre-World War II aviator

William Humble
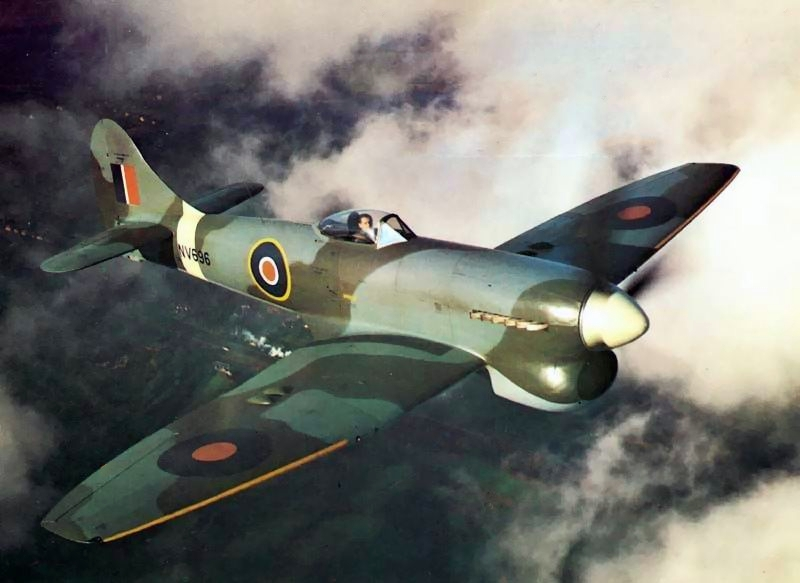
- Humble flying a Hawker Tempest Mk V
- Born: 14 April 1911; Doncaster, Yorkshire, England
- Died: 1 March 1992 (aged 80); Hampshire, England
- Relatives: Kate Humble (granddaughter)
- Military career
- Allegiance: United Kingdom
- Branch: Royal Air Force
- Service years: 1929–c. 1937
- Rank: Flying Officer
- Units: No. 504 (City of Nottingham) Squadron; No. 609 (West Riding) (Bomber) Squadron
- Awards: Member of the Order of the British Empire
- Other work: Test pilot and sales executive for Hawker Siddeley

William Humble MBE (14 April 1911 – 1 March 1992) was a well-known pre-Second World War aviator, known as an air racer and for his aerobatic displays. He was also an officer in the Royal Air Force Special Reserve, and the Auxiliary Air Force.

Although he qualified as a mining engineer the lure of flying proved too strong, and he did not enter the family mining company. During the war he became an important test pilot for aircraft manufacturer Hawker Siddeley. Having tested some of the early jet aircraft, he retired from test flying in 1948, becoming a sales executive for Hawker. He is the grandfather of British television presenter Kate Humble.

== Early life ==
Humble was born on 14 April 1911, the son of William Humble senior, a mining engineer and mine owner in the South Yorkshire coalfield, and also associated with the Staveley Coal and Iron Company. Humble was educated at Repton School and the University of Cambridge, following his father in qualifying as a mining engineer in 1930. He learnt to fly in the Auxiliary Air Force in 1929 (while still at university), and on 27 July 1930 he was commissioned as a pilot officer on probation in the Special Reserve of the Royal Air Force, his rank was confirmed on 25 October 1931, and he was promoted flying officer on 27 January 1932.

He was a founder member of No. 504 (City of Nottingham) Squadron, and during this period received flying instruction from Arthur Marshall. He transferred to the Reserve of Air Force Officers, Class A on 16 May 1932. In 1935 he entered the King's Cup Air Race, flying a Miles Hawk, he would enter again on several subsequent occasions. On 24 April 1936 he transferred to the Auxiliary Air Force, becoming a founder pilot of No. 609 (West Riding) (Bomber) Squadron, he returned to the Reserve of Officers on 31 August 1937. He married for the first time in 1936, but divorced just a few years later.

== Test pilot ==
Humble piloting the Hawker Tempest I prototype HM599

Following the outbreak of the Second World War Humble was invited to join Hawker Siddeley's team of test pilots, taking up the role on 10 October 1940. The testing team was led by George Bulman and Philip Lucas. Humble was initially involved in testing Hurricanes as they came off the production line at the rate of seven a day. Having proved his ability, he was soon assigned to help test and develop new aircraft types, initially the Hawker Typhoon, and then later types derived from it, the Hawker Tempest, Hawker Fury and Sea Fury. The Typhoon became particularly important as a "tank-buster" during the Normandy Campaign, and the Tempest in the fight against the V-1 flying bomb.

Development of the Fury was a particularly difficult experience. The aircraft could approach the sound barrier in a dive, causing unexpected handling problems; the Bristol Centaurus engine was also still relatively new and experienced many problems, on more than one occasion it was only Humble's skill as a pilot which prevented a crash. Bulman had retired towards the end of the war, Lucas then became Hawker's chief test pilot. In mid-1945, Lucas was promoted to the board of the company, and in early January 1946, Humble was appointed the new chief test pilot. Hawker now moved into the jet age, with Humble making the first test flight of the Hawker P.1040 from Boscombe Down on 2 September 1947. This ultimately entered service as the Hawker Sea Hawk.

== Later life and legacy ==
Humble retired from testing in 1948, remaining with Hawker as a sales executive. He continued to give demonstration flights, and his skill as a display pilot is credited with helping to win Hawker sales. His main sales territory was the Middle East, and he spent much time in Egypt, Lebanon and Cyprus. According to his obituary in The Times he was appointed Member of the Order of the British Empire in 1949.

He returned to the United Kingdom permanently in the late 1980s when his health began to deteriorate. He died on 1 March 1992, survived by his second wife, Georgina, his son (by his first wife) and his daughter. In an episode of the BBC television programme, Who Do You Think You Are?, first broadcast on 29 July 2009, TV presenter Kate Humble investigated her family history, starting by finding out more about her grandfather, Bill Humble. During a visit to the RAF Museum at Hendon, she was shown film footage of her grandfather flying, and spoke to one of his former colleagues, Captain Eric 'Winkle' Brown.
