= Rolls-Royce Pegasus =

1950s British turbofan aircraft engine

Pegasus / F402
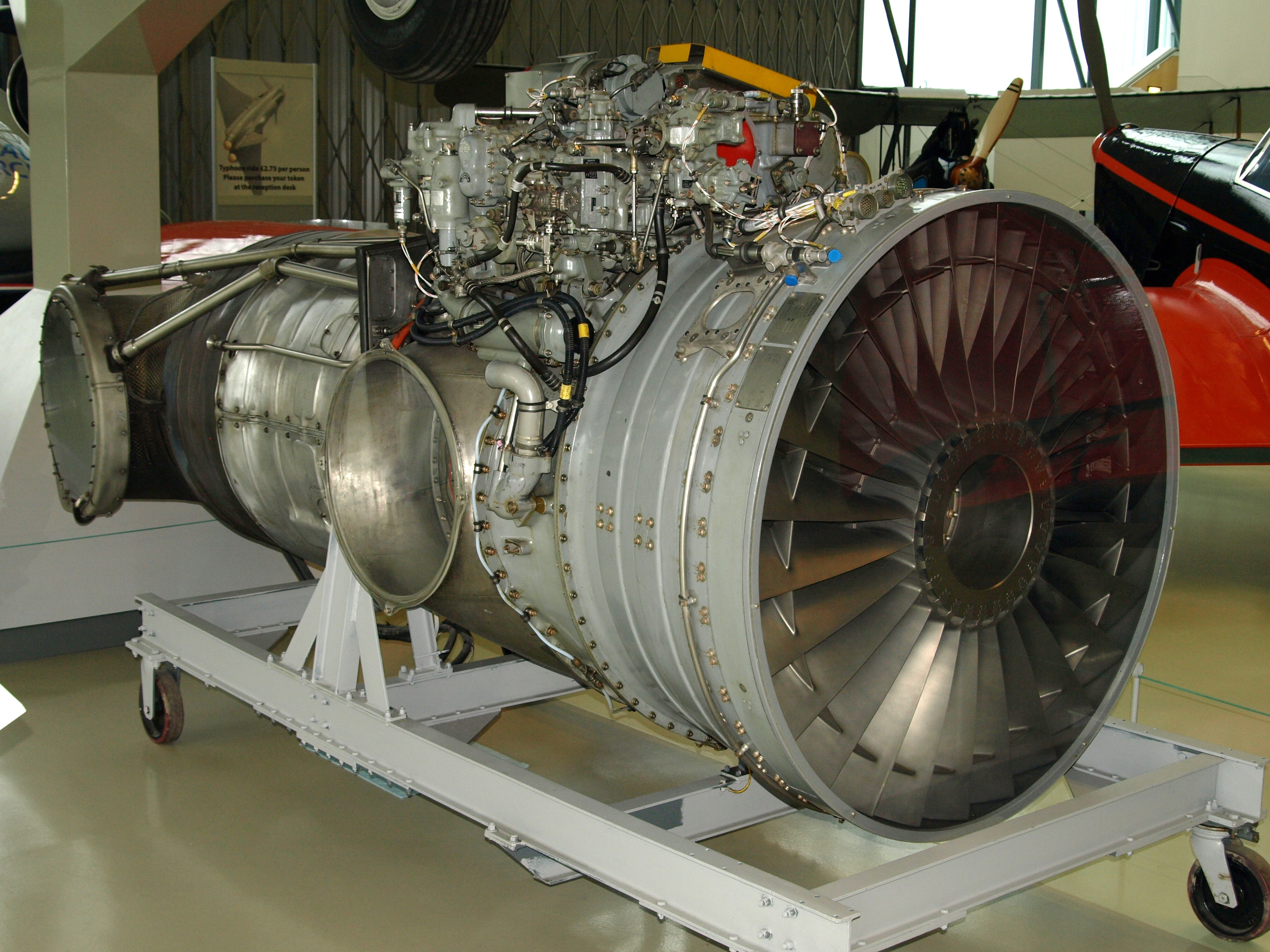
- Rolls-Royce Pegasus on display at the Royal Air Force Museum London
- Type: Turbofan
- National origin: United Kingdom
- Manufacturer: Rolls-Royce
- First run: September 1959
- Major applications: Hawker Siddeley Harrier; BAE Sea Harrier; McDonnell Douglas AV-8B Harrier II
- Number built: Over 1,200 (through 2008)
- Developed from: Bristol Siddeley Orpheus

The Rolls-Royce Pegasus, originally the Bristol Siddeley Pegasus, is a British turbofan engine used for V/STOL aircraft. Originally designed by Bristol Siddeley, it was manufactured by Rolls-Royce plc. after their takeover of Bristol Siddeley. The engine is not only able to power a jet aircraft forward, but also to direct thrust (from both the fan and the turbine) downwards via swivelling nozzles. Lightly loaded aircraft equipped with this engine can manoeuvre like a helicopter. In particular, they can perform vertical takeoffs and landings. In US service, the engine is designated F402.

The engine powers all versions of the Harrier family of multi-role military aircraft. Rolls-Royce licensed Pratt & Whitney to build the Pegasus for US built versions. However Pratt & Whitney never completed any engines, with all new build being manufactured by Rolls-Royce in Bristol, England. The Pegasus was also the planned engine for a number of aircraft projects, among which were the prototypes of the German Dornier Do 31 VSTOL military transport project.

== Development ==
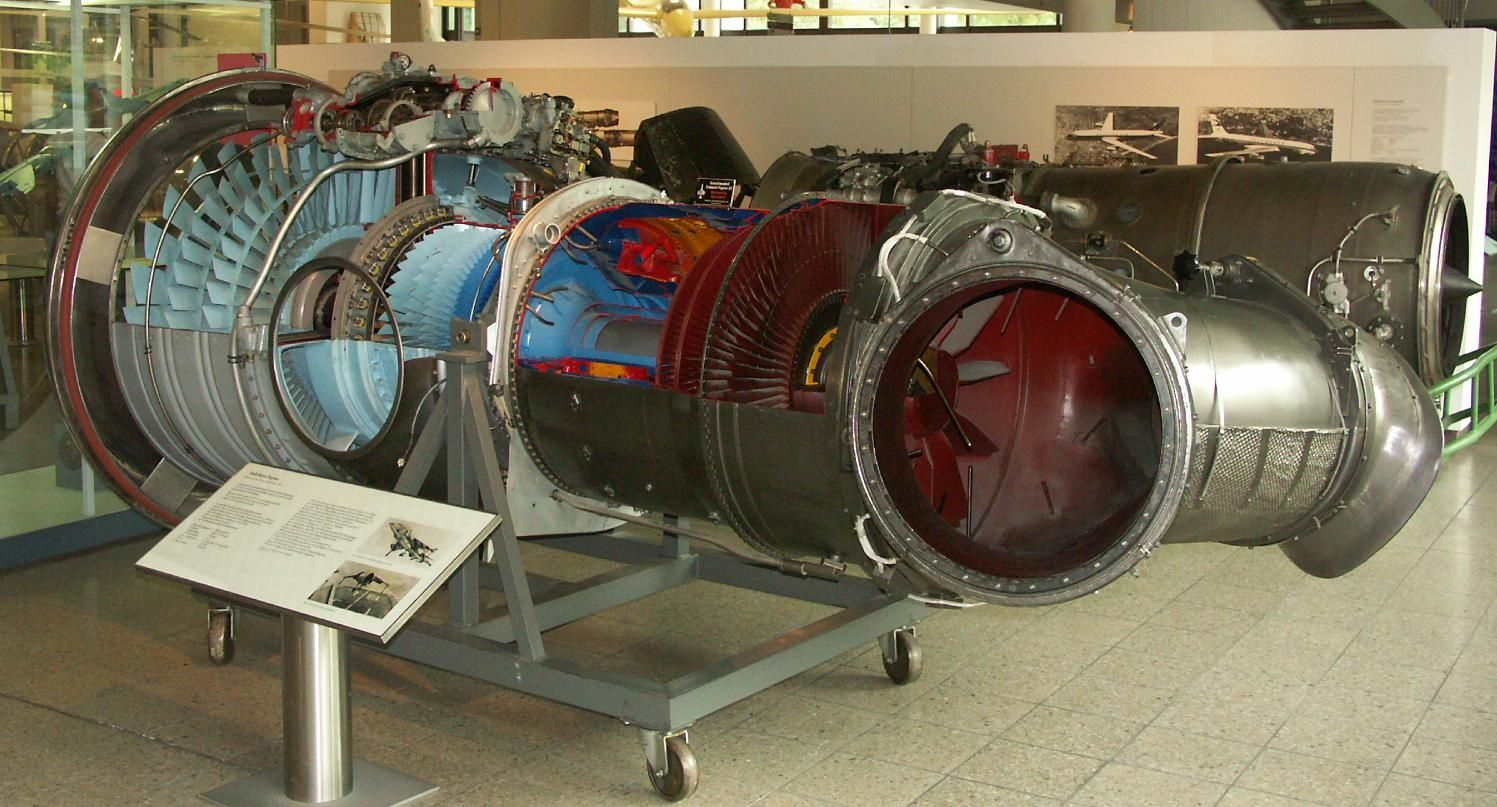
Rolls-Royce Pegasus

=== Background ===
Michel Wibault, the French aircraft designer, had the idea to use vectored thrust for vertical take-off aircraft. This thrust would come from four centrifugal blowers shaft driven by a Bristol Orion turboprop, the exhaust from each blower being vectored by rotating the blower scrolls. Although the idea of vectoring the thrust was quite novel, the engine proposed was considered to be far too heavy.

As a result, an engineer at Bristol Engine Company, Gordon Lewis, began in 1956 to study alternative engine concepts, using, where possible, existing engine components from their Orpheus and Olympus turbojet engine series. The work was overseen by the Technical Director Stanley Hooker. One concept which looked promising was the BE52, which initially used the Orpheus 3 as the engine core and, on a separate coaxial shaft, the first two stages of an Olympus 21 LP compressor, which acted as a fan, delivering compressed air to two thrust vectoring nozzles at the front of engine. At this point in the design exercise, the exhaust from the LP turbine discharged through a conventional rear nozzle. There were separate intakes for the fan and core compressor because the fan did not supercharge the core compressor.

Although the BE.52 was a self-contained power plant and lighter than Wibault's concept, the BE.52 was still complicated and heavy. As a result, work on the BE.53 concept started in February 1957. In the BE.53 the Olympus stages were fitted close to the Orpheus stages; thus simplifying the inlet ducting. The Olympus stages now supercharged the Orpheus core, improving the overall pressure ratio, creating what is now considered a conventional turbofan configuration.

For a year Bristol designed the engine in isolation, with little feedback from the various airframe manufacturers furnished with data. However, in May 1957 the team received a supportive letter from Sydney Camm of Hawker Aviation stating they were looking for a Hawker Hunter replacement. The aircraft designer, Ralph Hooper, suggested having the four thrust vectoring nozzles (originally suggested by Lewis), with hot gases from the rear two. Further joint discussions helped to refine the engine design.

The 1957 Defence White Paper, which focused on missiles, and not crewed aircraft – which were declared 'obsolete' - was not good news, because it precluded any future government financial support for development of not already extant crewed combat aircraft. This prevented any official financial support for the engine or aircraft from the Ministry of Defence. Fortunately, engine development was financially supported to the tune of 75% from the NATO Mutual Weapons Development Program, Verdon Smith of Bristol Siddeley Engines Limited (BSEL), which Bristol Engines had by then become on its merger with Armstrong Siddeley, quickly agreeing to pay the remainder.

The first prototype engine (one of two BE53/2s built), ran on 2 September 1959 and featured a 2-stage fan and used the Orpheus 6 core. Although the fan was overhung, inlet guide vanes were still incorporated. The HP spool comprised a 7-stage compressor driven by a single-stage turbine. A 2-stage LP turbine drove the fan. There was no plenum at fan exit, but 4 thrust-vectoring nozzles were fitted.

Further development of the engine then proceeded in tandem with the aircraft, the Hawker P.1127. The aircraft first flew (tethered hover) on 21 October 1960, powered by the BE53/3 (Pegasus 2). Free hover was achieved on 19 November of the same year. Transition to wing-borne flight occurred in 1961. Later versions of the P.1127 were fitted with the Pegasus 3 and eventually the Pegasus 5.

The Pegasus 5 was also used in the Kestrel FGA.1, a refinement of the P.1127, of which nine were built for a Tripartite evaluation exercise. The Kestrel was subsequently developed into the Harrier combat aircraft. By the time the Pegasus 5/2 was built, both the fan and HP compressor had been zero-staged and 2nd stage added to the HP turbine.

=== Testing and production ===
The flight testing and engine development received no government funding; the plane's funding came entirely from Hawker.

The first engines had barely enough thrust to lift the plane off the ground due to weight growth problems. Flight tests were initially conducted with the aircraft tethered, with the first free hover achieved on 19 November 1960. The first transition from static hover to conventional flight was achieved on 8 September 1961. It was originally feared that the aircraft would have difficulty transitioning between level and vertical flight, but during testing it was found to be extremely simple. Testing showed that because of the extreme power-to-weight ratio it only took a few degrees of nozzle movement to get the aircraft moving forward quickly enough to produce lift from the wing, and that even at a 15-degree angle the aircraft accelerated very well. The pilot simply had to move the nozzle control forward slowly. During transition from horizontal back to vertical the pilot would simply slow to roughly 200 knots and turn the nozzles downward, allowing the engine thrust to take over as the aircraft slowed and the wings stopped producing lift.

The RAF was not much of a convert to the VTOL idea, and described the whole project as a "toy" and a "crowd pleaser". The first prototype P1127 made a very heavy landing at the Paris Air Show in 1963.

Series manufacture and design and development improvement to the Pegasus to produce ever-higher thrusts were continued by Bristol engines beyond 1966, when Rolls-Royce Ltd bought the company. A related engine design, the 39,500 lbf (with reheat) Bristol Siddeley BS100 for a supersonic VTOL fighter (the Hawker Siddeley P.1154) was not developed to production as the aircraft project was cancelled in 1965.

A non-vectored 26,000 lb thrust derivative of the Pegasus running on liquid hydrogen, the RB.420, was designed and offered in 1970 in response to a NASA requirement for an engine to power the projected Space Shuttle on its return flight through the atmosphere. In the event, NASA chose a shuttle design using a non-powered gliding return.

== Design ==
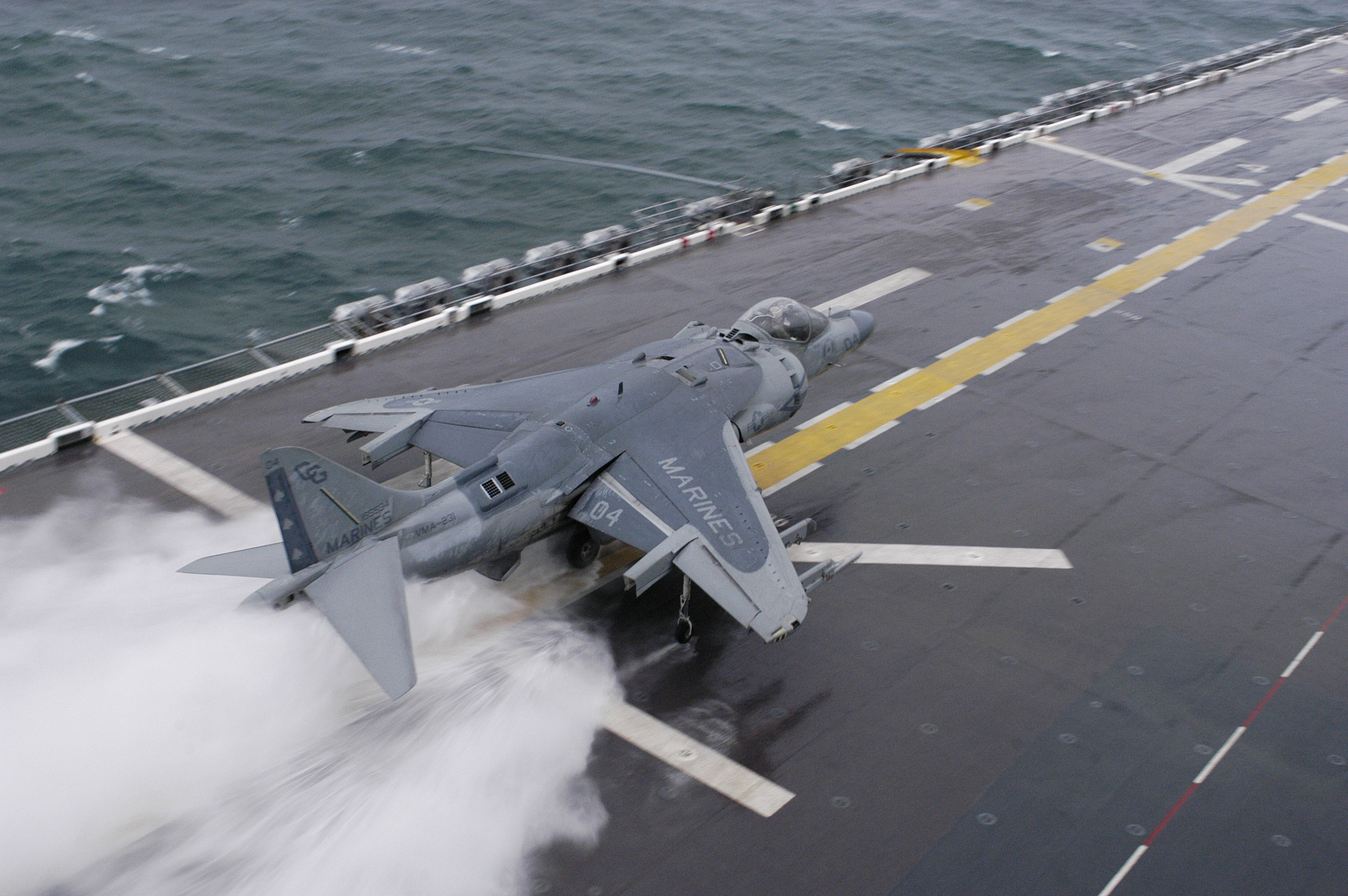
USMC Harrier short-takeoff run on wet deck.

The Pegasus vectored-thrust turbofan is a two-shaft design with three low pressure (LP) and eight high pressure (HP) compressor stages driven by two LP and two HP turbine stages respectively. It is the first turbofan to have the fan ahead of the LP shaft front bearing. This eliminated the requirement for bearing-support struts in front of the fan and the icing hazard that goes with them. Unusually the LP and HP spools rotate in opposite directions which significantly reduces the gyroscopic effects which would otherwise cause aircraft control problems at low aircraft speeds. LP and HP blades are made from titanium. The fan is a transonic design and airflow is 432 lb/s. The engine employs a simple thrust vectoring system that uses four swiveling nozzles, giving the Harrier thrust both for lift and forward propulsion, allowing for STOVL flight.

Combustion system is an annular combustor with ASM low-pressure vaporising burners.

Engine starting was by a top-mounted packaged combined gas turbine starter/APU.

=== Nozzles ===
Locations of the four nozzles on the engine.

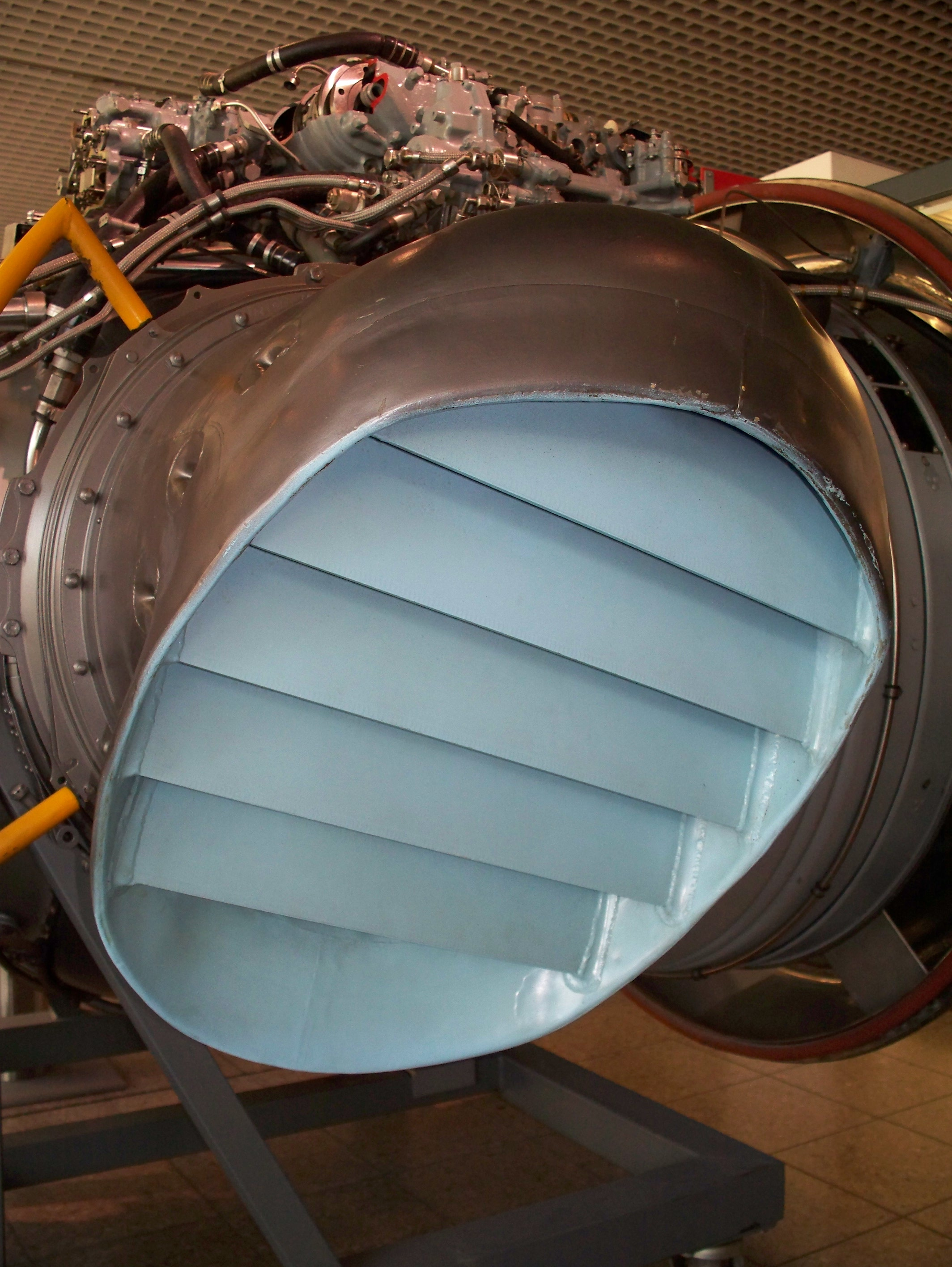
Exhaust nozzle

The front nozzles, which are made of steel, are fed with air from the LP compressor, and the rear nozzles, which are of Nimonic with hot (650 °C) jet exhaust. The airflow split is about 60/40 front/back. The nozzles are rotated using motorcycle chains driven by air motors powered by air from the HP compressor. The nozzles rotate through a range of 98.5 degrees.

=== Position of the engine ===
The engine is mounted in the centre of the Harrier and as a result, it was necessary to remove the wing to change the powerplant after mounting the fuselage on trestles. The change took a minimum of eight hours, although using the proper tools and lifting equipment this could be accomplished in less than four.

=== Water injection ===
The maximum take-off thrust available from the Pegasus engine is limited, particularly at the higher ambient temperatures, by the turbine blade temperature. As this temperature cannot reliably be measured, the operating limits are determined by jet pipe temperature. To enable the engine speed and hence thrust to be increased for take-off, water is sprayed into the combustion chamber and turbine to keep the blade temperature down to an acceptable level.

Water for the injection system is contained in a tank located between the bifurcated section of the rear (hot) exhaust duct. The tank contains up to 500 lb (227 kg, 50 imperial gallons) of distilled water. Water flow rate for the required turbine temperature reduction is approximately 35 imperial gallons per minute for a maximum duration of approximately 90 seconds. The quantity of water carried is sufficient for and appropriate to the particular operational role of the aircraft.

Selection of water injection engine ratings (Lift Wet/Short Lift Wet) results in an increase in the engine speed and jet pipe temperature limits beyond the respective dry (non-injected) ratings (Lift Dry/Short Lift Dry). Upon exhausting the available water supply in the tank, the limits are reset to the 'dry' levels. A warning light in the cockpit provides advance warning of water depletion to the pilot.

== Variants ==
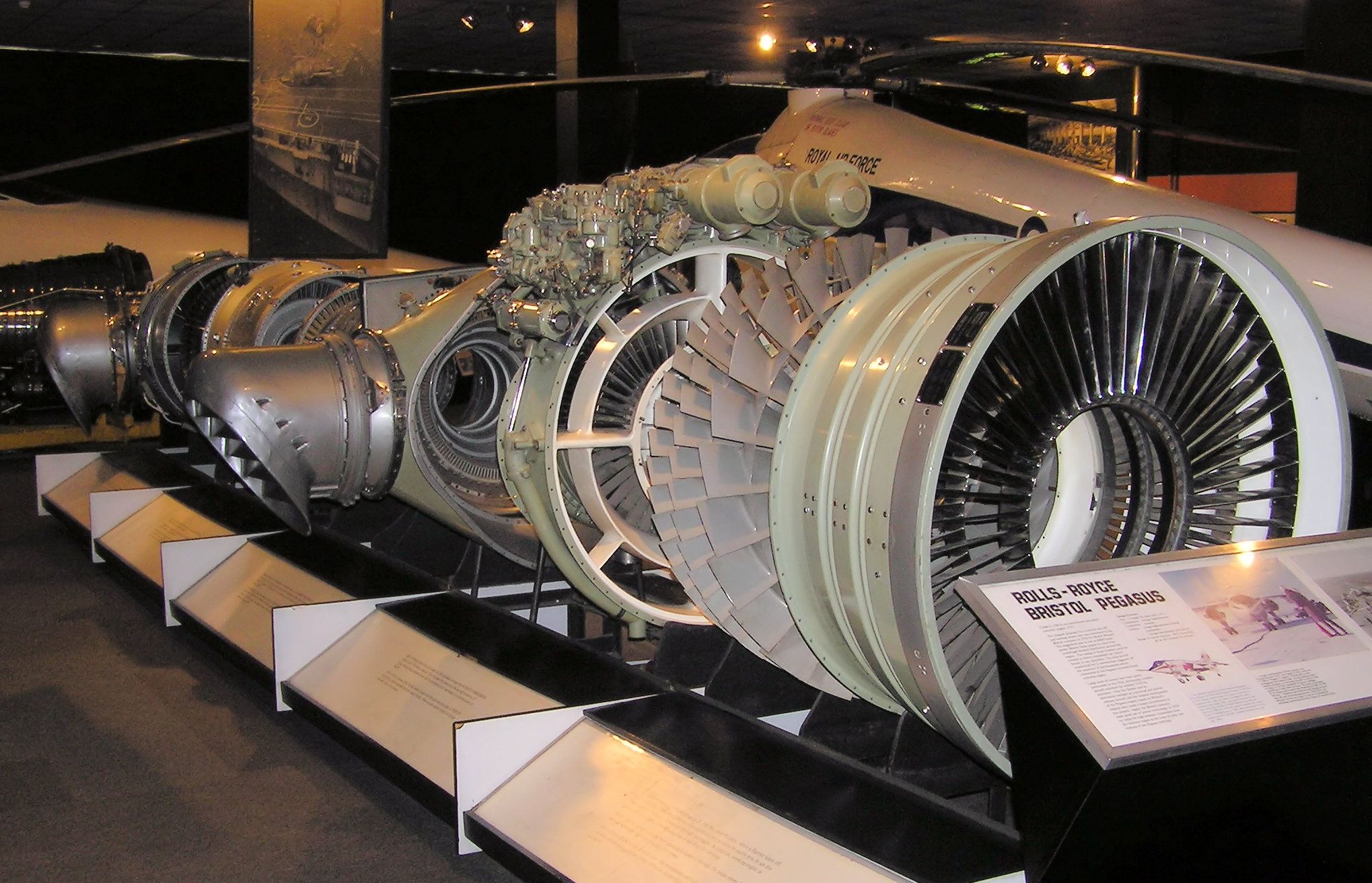
Rolls-Royce Bristol Pegasus, engine of the vertical takeoff Harrier, in the Bristol Industrial Museum, England.

Pegasus 1 (BE53-2)
The two prototype engines were demonstrator engines which developed about 9,000 lbf (40 kN) on the test bed. Neither engine was installed in a P.1127.
Pegasus 2 (BE53-3)
Used in the initial P.1127s, 11,500 lbf (51 kN)
Pegasus 3
Used on the P.1127 prototypes, 13,500 lbf (60 kN)
Pegasus 5 (BS.53-5)
Used for the Hawker Siddeley Kestrel evaluation aircraft at 15,000 lbf (67 kN)
Pegasus 6 (Mk.101)
For initial production Harriers at 19,000 lbf (85 kN), first flown in 1966 and entered service 1969
Pegasus 10 (Mk.102)
For updating first Harriers with more power and used for the AV-8A, 20,500 lbf (91 kN), entering service in 1971.
Pegasus 11 (Mk.103)
The Pegasus 11 powered the first generation Harriers, the RAF's Hawker Siddeley Harrier GR.3, the USMC AV-8A and later the Royal Navy's BAe Sea Harrier. The Pegasus 11 produced 21,000 lbf (93 kN) and entered service in 1974.
Pegasus 14 (Mk.104)
Navalised version of the Pegasus 11 for the Sea Harrier, same as the 11 but some engine components and castings made from corrosion-resistant materials.
Pegasus 11-21 (Mk.105 / Mk.106)
The 11-21 was developed for the second generation Harriers, the USMC McDonnel Douglas AV-8B Harrier II and the British Aerospace Harrier IIs. The original model provided an extra 450 lbf (2.0 kN). The RAF Harriers entered service with the 11-21 Mk.105, the AV-8Bs with F402-RR-406. Depending on time constraints and water injection, between 14,450 lbf (64.3 kN) (max. continuous at 91% RPM) and 21,550 lbf (95.9 kN) (15 s wet at 107% RPM) of lift is available at sea level (including splay loss at 90°). The Mk.106 development was produced for the Sea Harrier FA2 upgrade and generates 21,750 lbf (96.7 kN).
Pegasus 11-61 (Mk.107)
The 11-61 (aka -408) is the latest and most powerful version of the Pegasus, providing 23,800 lbf (106 kN). This equates to up to 15 percent more thrust at high ambient temperatures, allowing upgraded Harriers to return to an aircraft carrier without having to dump any unused weapons which along with the reduced maintenance reduces total cost of engine use. This latest Pegasus is also fitted to the AV-8B+. The RAF/RN was in the process of upgrading its GR7 fleet to GR9 standard, initially through the Joint Upgrade and Maintenance Programme (JUMP) and then through the Harrier Platform Availability Contract (HPAC). All GR7 aircraft were expected to have been upgraded by April 2010. Part of this process was the upgrade of the Mk.105 engines to Mk.107 standard. These aircraft were known as GR7As and GR9As.

== Applications ==
- AV-8B Harrier II
- BAE Sea Harrier
- BAE Harrier II
- Dornier Do 31
- Hawker Siddeley Harrier
- Hawker Siddeley P.1127

Intended application

- Armstrong Whitworth AW.681

== Engines on display ==
Pegasus engines are on public display at the following museums:

- Fleet Air Arm Museum, Yeovilton
- Imperial War Museum Duxford
- Royal Air Force Museum London
- Cranfield University England
- Science Museum (London)
- National Naval Aviation Museum Pensacola, Florida
- Naval Aviation Museum (India), Goa, India
- Deutsches Museum, Munich, Germany
- Universidad Politécnica de Madrid, Madrid, Spain
- Rolls-Royce Heritage Trust Allison, Indianapolis, Indiana
- Rolls-Royce Heritage Trust Collection (Derby)
- Airworld Aviation Museum, Caernarfon, Wales, UK
- City of Norwich Aviation Museum in Horsham St Faith, Norfolk.
- Wings Aviation Museum BE53-3 near Handcross, Haywards Heath, Sussex

== Specifications (Pegasus 11-61) ==
Data from

==== General characteristics ====
- Type: Twin-spool turbofan
- Length: 137 in (3.480 m)
- Diameter: 48 in (1.219 m)
- Dry weight: 3,960 lb (1,796 kg)

==== Components ====
- Compressor: 3-stage low pressure, 8-stage high pressure axial flow
- Combustors: Annular
- Turbine: 2-stage high pressure, 2-stage low pressure

==== Performance ====
- Maximum thrust: 23,800 lbf (106 kN)
- Overall pressure ratio: 16.3:1
- Specific fuel consumption: 0.76 lb/lbf-hr
- Thrust-to-weight ratio: 6:1

== See also ==
- Rolls-Royce LiftSystem

Related development

- Bristol Siddeley Orpheus
- Rolls-Royce/MAN Turbo RB193

Comparable engines

- Bristol Siddeley BS100

Related lists

- List of aircraft engines
