= Bristol Orion =

1950s British turboprop aircraft engine

Orion
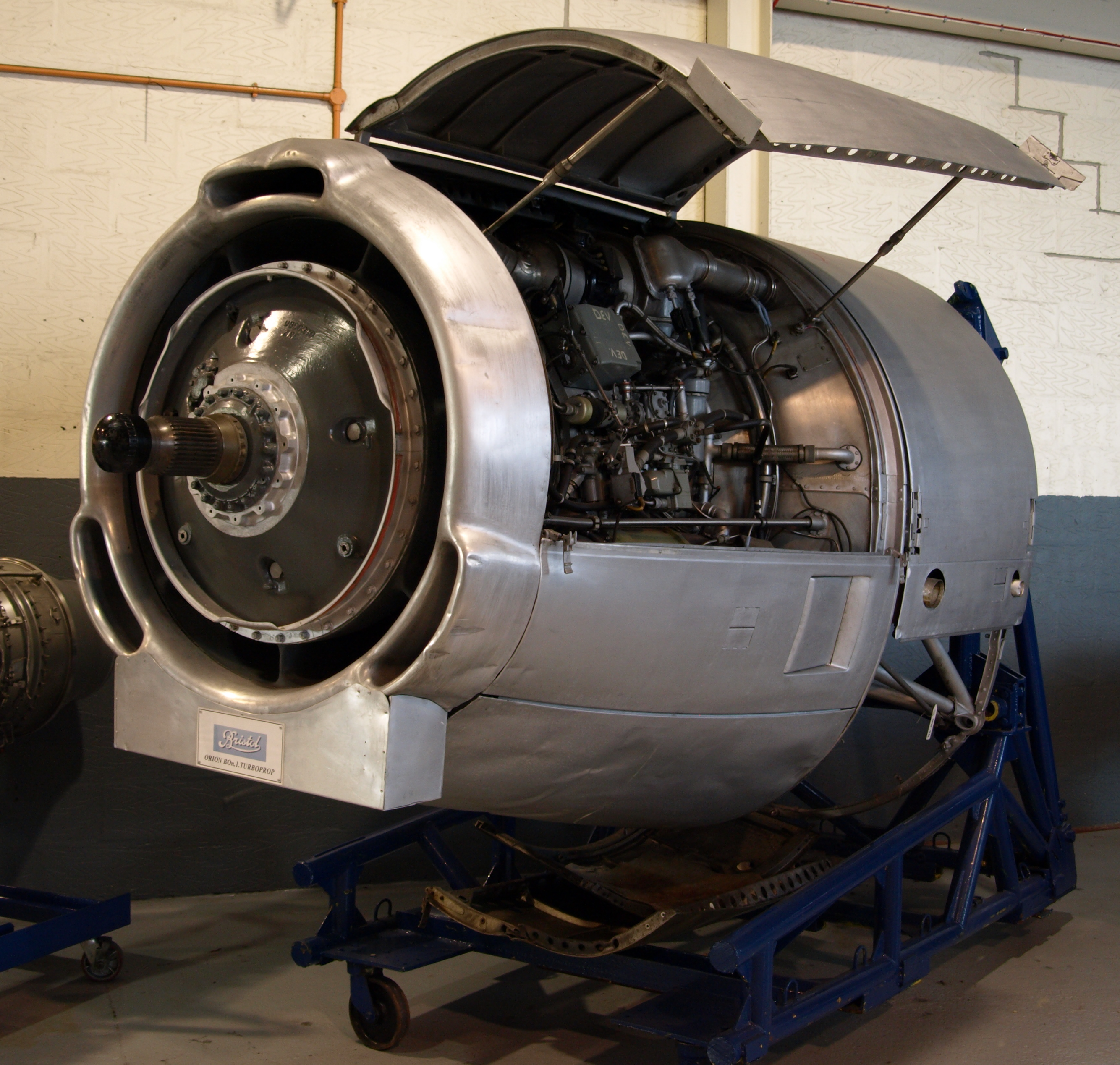
- Bristol Orion on display at the Rolls-Royce Heritage Trust, Derby
- Type: Turboprop
- Manufacturer: Bristol Siddeley
- First run: 1956
- Major applications: Bristol Britannia

The Bristol Orion aero engine is a two-shaft turboprop intended for use in later marks of the Bristol Britannia and the Canadair CL-44. Although the engine was built and underwent a development program, the BE.25 Orion project was cancelled in 1958 by the British Ministry of Supply in favour of the Rolls-Royce Tyne. In addition, interest in turboprop-powered aircraft was beginning to wane, because of the successful introduction of the Boeing 707 and Douglas DC-8 jetliners into airline service.

The Orion gas generator had been chosen by French aircraft designer Wibault to power a vectored thrust aircraft which ultimately became the Hawker Siddeley P.1127 but with a Bristol Siddeley Orpheus gas generator which had a compressor derived from the Orion low pressure compressor.

== Design and development ==
A single-stage HP turbine drove a five-stage all-axial HP compressor, while a three-stage LP turbine drove both the seven-stage LP compressor and the propeller, via a reduction gearbox. Thus the Orion used a shared-load LP turbine (like the Rolls-Royce Tyne), whereas its predecessor, the Bristol Proteus, had a free-power turbine. The combustor used separate flame cans.

One novel feature of the Orion was a derate from a thermodynamic rating of 9,000 shp at sea level, to enable a constant 5,150 ehp power level to be maintained up to 15,000 ft altitude.

The Orion project was cancelled in January 1958, at a reported total cost of £4.75 million (equivalent to $96,715,966 in 2025).

== Applications ==
- Bristol Britannia
- Canadair CL-44

== Specifications (BOn.1 Orion) ==
Data from Flightglobal archive.

==== General characteristics ====
- Type: Twin-spool turboprop
- Length: 112.3 in (2,850 mm)
- Diameter: 41.8 in (1,060 mm)
- Dry weight: 3,240 lb (1,470 kg)

==== Components ====
- Compressor: 7-stage LP axial flow compressor; 5-stage HP axial flow compressor
- Combustors: Cannular combustor with 10 flame tubes
- Turbine: Single-stage HP turbine, 3-stage LP turbine
- Fuel type: Kerosene / JP-1
- Oil system: 3 independent systems at 80 psi (550 kPa)

==== Performance ====
- Maximum power output: Take-off 5,150 shp (3,840 kW) (equivalent horsepower)
- Overall pressure ratio: 10:1
- Air mass flow: 82 lb/s (37 kg/s)
- Specific fuel consumption: 0.39 lb/hp/h (0.066 kg/kW/ks) (equivalent horsepower)
- Thrust-to-weight ratio: 1.63 hp/lb (2.68 kW/kg) (equivalent horsepower)

== See also ==
Related development

- Bristol Proteus

Comparable engines

- Rolls-Royce Tyne

Related lists

- List of aircraft engines
