= Hawker Siddeley P.1127 =

British experimental V/STOL aircraft

P.1127 / Kestrel
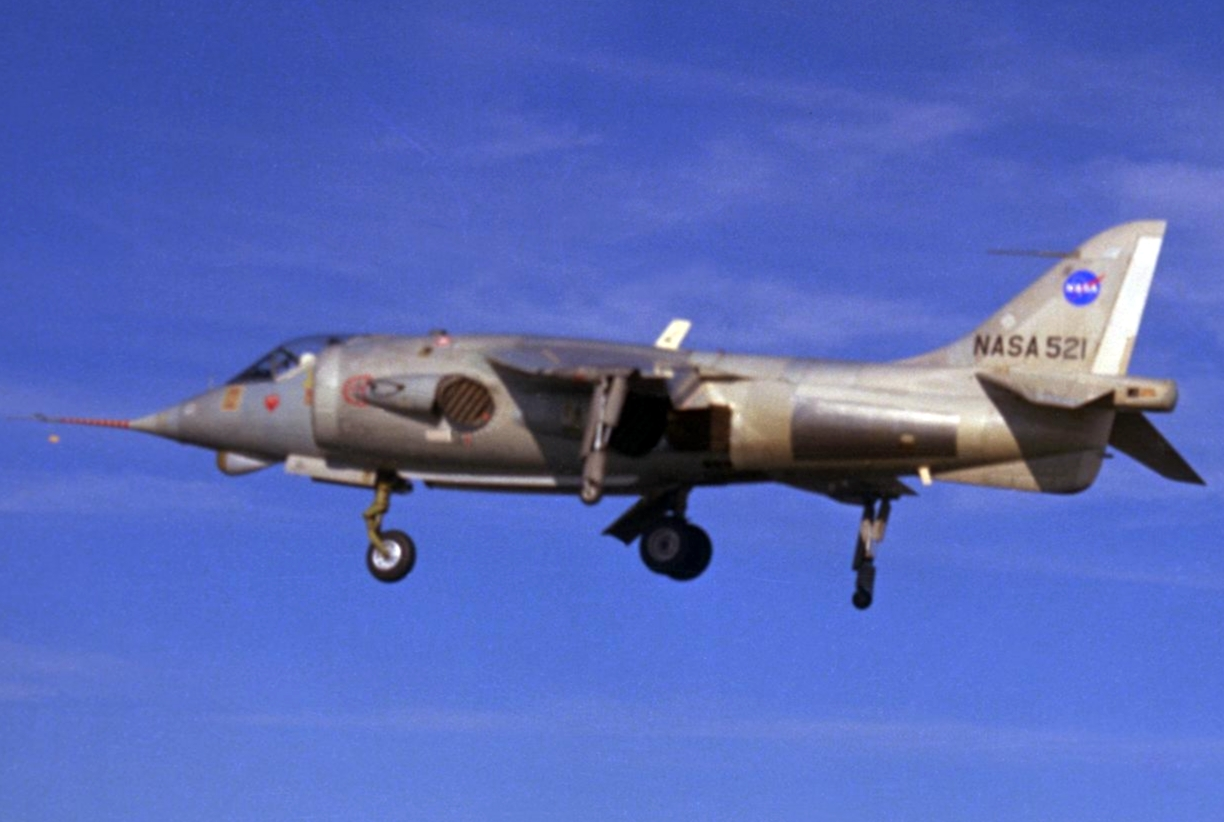
- Hawker XV-6A Kestrel in 1968

General information
- Type: Experimental V/STOL aircraft
- National origin: United Kingdom
- Manufacturer: Hawker Aviation; Hawker Siddeley
- Designer: Sydney Camm; Ralph Hooper
- Primary users: Royal Air Force US Department of Defense/NASA; German Air Force
- Number built: 6 P.1127s; 9 Kestrels

History
- First flight: 19 November 1960 (P.1127); 7 March 1964 (Kestrel)
- Developed into: Hawker Siddeley Harrier

The Hawker P.1127 and the Hawker Siddeley Kestrel FGA.1 are the British experimental and development aircraft that led to the Hawker Siddeley Harrier, the first vertical and/or short take-off and landing (V/STOL) jet fighter-bomber.

Development began in 1957, taking advantage of the Bristol Engine Company's choice to invest in the creation of the Pegasus vectored-thrust engine. Testing began in July 1960 and by the end of the year the aircraft had achieved both vertical take-off and horizontal flight. The test program also explored the possibility of use upon aircraft carriers, landing on HMS Ark Royal in 1963. The first three aircraft crashed during testing, one at the 1963 Paris Air Show.

Improvements to future development aircraft, such as swept wings and more powerful Pegasus engines, led to the development of the Kestrel. The Kestrel was evaluated by the Tri-partite Evaluation Squadron, made up of military pilots from the United Kingdom, the United States, and West Germany. Later flights were conducted by the U.S. military and NASA.

Related work on a supersonic aircraft, the Hawker Siddeley P.1154, was cancelled in 1965. As a result, the P.1127 (RAF), a variant more closely based on the Kestrel, was ordered into production that year, and named Harrier – the name originally intended for the P.1154 – in 1967. The Harrier served with the UK and several other nations, often as a carrier-based aircraft.

== Development ==
=== Background ===
Following the end of the Korean War, a number of aircraft companies in both Europe and America separately decided to investigate the prospective of vertical take-off and landing (VTOL) aircraft, which would eliminate the requirement for vulnerable runways by taking off and landing vertically as opposed to the conventional horizontal approach. In addition to military applications, the prospect of applying such technology to commercial airliners was also viewed with considerable interest by the mid-1950s, thus the value of developing viable vertical take-off systems was judged to be substantial. However, even during this era, few companies had envisioned that a VTOL aircraft would also be realistically compatible with the characteristics of high performance military aircraft.

In 1957, jet engine engineer Stanley Hooker of the Bristol Engine Company informed aeronautics engineer Sydney Camm of Hawker Aircraft that Bristol had been working a project that combined major elements of their Olympus and Orpheus jet engines to produce a directable fan jet. The projected fan jet harnessed rotatable cold jets which were positioned on either side of the compressor along with a 'hot' jet which was directed via a conventional central tailpipe. The original concept upon which the engine, which had been named Pegasus, (Note: The name "Pegasus" for the engine was in keeping with Bristol's tradition of naming engines after figures from classical mythology) was based came from Michel Wibault, a French aviation consultant. Several adaptions and enhancements were made by Bristol to reduce size and weight over Wibault's original concept.

Around the same point as Hooker's approach, Hawker had been working upon the development of a replacement fighter aircraft for the Hawker Hunter, designated as the P.1121. However, the P.1121 was cancelled shortly after the publishing of the 1957 Defence White Paper, which had advocated a policy shift away from crewed aircraft and towards missiles. (Note: The development of a V/STOL jet was not Hawker's primary objective as it had put in a joint bid with Avro to meet the GOR.339 Requirement (which resulted in the BAC TSR-2 development programme), but had been unsuccessful. The inability to obtain work on conventional aircraft in a hostile political climate was perhaps the greatest motivation for Hawker to proceed with the development of the Harrier.) In light of this cancellation, Hawker found itself with the available resources to commit to a new project, and thus decided to study the use of the projected Pegasus engine as a basis for a new military aeroplane that would be able to conform with an active NATO specification that sought a new Light Tactical Support Fighter to replace the Fiat G.91. Particular attention was paid to meeting the specification's performance and load requirements.

According to Air Chief Marshal Sir Patrick Hine, Hawker's interest may have also been stimulated by the presence of Air Staff Requirement 345, which sought a V/STOL ground attack fighter for the Royal Air Force (RAF). Aviation author Francis K. Mason expressed a contrary view, stating that Hawker's decision to proceed was independent of British government initiatives, and that the P.1127 project was primarily based upon the NATO requirement instead. Hawker had a keen ally in its development in the form of Bristol, but by that point the latter was experiencing financial difficulties, and the lack of foreseeable commercial applications for the Pegasus engine in particular, coupled with refusals from HM Treasury, meant that development would have to be financed by NATO institutions instead. The close cooperation between Hawker and Bristol was viewed by project engineer Gordon Lewis as a key factor which had enabled the P.1127's development to proceed in spite of technical obstacles and political setbacks.

=== Origins ===
Senior project engineer Ralph Hooper at Hawker promptly set about establishing an initial layout for a theoretical aircraft to take advantage of the Pegasus engine, using data provided by Bristol. This proposed aircraft soon received the internal designation P.1127. In July 1957, a modification made to the design was the incorporation of a bifurcated tailpipe, similar to the Hawker Sea Hawk, which was equipped with rotatable nozzles for the hot exhaust, similar those already used for the cold exhaust. The switch from a single tailpipe meant that the initial tailwheel undercarriage could also be discarded in favour a conventional nose wheel-led undercarriage. The design process extended throughout 1958, being financed entirely by Hawker, while approaches were made to NATO headquarters (Belgium) to better establish the tactical requirements sought, particularly between the conflicting demands for a lightly armed supersonic fighter and a simpler multipurpose subsonic one.

The development process had involved extensive use of physical models; for one series of blowing trials, mixtures of focused hot and cold air were directed onto ground platforms to simulate the ground effect upon take-off. This work was considered to be critical to the project as there was very little knowledge of the adverse effects which could influence the aircraft during the vertical takeoff process; as there was no airflow over the ailerons, tailplane, and rudder while the aircraft was held in a stationary hover, wingtip control jets were experimented with as an alternative reaction control approach. This research included the development of an all-new control response simulator which linked a series of simple flying controls to a computer. By the end of 1958, barely eighteen months after the start of the project, all the main features of the P.1127 were developed with one exception, that being the reaction control system, the development of which was completed by April 1959.

Throughout the development, Camm heavily emphasised the importance of the design's simplicity, observing that "Sophistication means complication, then in turn escalation, cancellation, and finally ruination". In 1958, the design centred around a single Pegasus engine capable of generating 13,000 lbf (58 kN) of thrust; when fully equipped, the aircraft was to weigh slightly less than the maximum thrust, thereby allowing vertical take-offs to be performed under all nominal conditions. During late 1958, the rapid progress of the P.1127 project had been noticed by technical advisors at NATO, who began promoting the acceleration of the aircraft's development and that member nations should skip over the next generation of support fighters in favour of the emergent P.1127 instead. In Britain, support for the program was also growing within the British Air Staff, from January 1959 onwards, rumours of a pair of P.1127 prototypes being ordered by the Ministry of Supply alongside those of an Air Ministry specification being drafted around the project frequently echoed.

As the P.1127 had been developed at a time of deep UK defense cuts, Hawker had to seek commercial funding, and significant engine development funding came from the U.S. Research assistance was also provided by the U.S., including a series of wind tunnel tests conducted by NASA's Langley Research Center using sub-scale models, which demonstrated acceptable flight characteristics. Hawker test pilot Hugh Merewether went to the U.S. at NASA's request to fly the Bell X-14. In March 1959, the company's board of directors (Hawker Siddeley then) decided to privately fund two P.1127 prototypes.

In February 1959, Hawker had completed practically all of the design work and thus passed the entirety of its manufacturing design work to the company's Experimental Design Office at Kingston, London. In April 1959, the Ministry of Supply formally issued a contract for the completion of a pair of P.1127 prototypes. However, there were critics amongst the Air Staff of the project, typically disliking the P.1127 for its subsonic speeds, favouring supersonic-capable aircraft instead; Mason attributes this as having caused considerable delay in the issuing of a contract to Hawker. On 23 July 1959, Hawker authorised the application of maximum effort to complete the development of the P.1127.

=== P.1127 ===
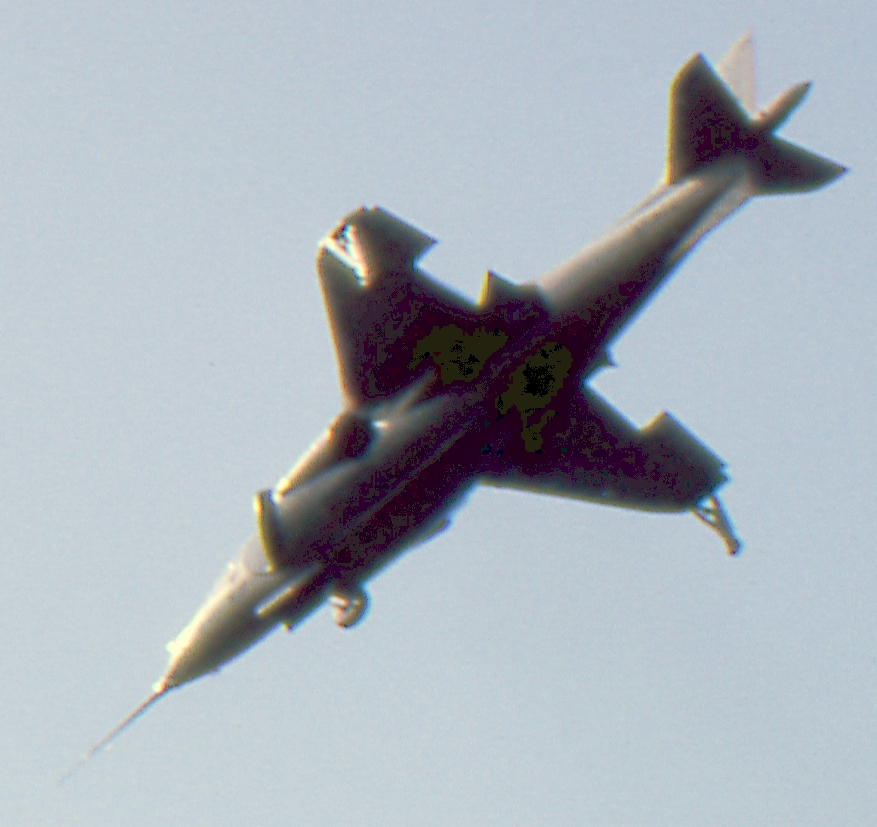
Third prototype at Farnborough 1962 with unswept trailing edges and rounded tips

On 15 July 1960, the first "P.1127 Prototype V/STOL Strike Aircraft", serial XP831, was delivered to Dunsfold Aerodrome, Surrey, to commence static engine testing. On 31 August 1960, the Pegasus engine was run for the first time while inside the airframe. Some of the tests were performed from a purpose-built platform at the aerodrome which functioned to deflect the hot exhaust gases away from the aircraft during early hovering trials while more powerful versions of the engine were developed. On 13 October 1960, the first Pegasus flight engine, capable of generating 11,300 lbf (50 kN) of thrust, was delivered to Dunsfold.

On 21 October 1960, the initial tethered flight, performed by XP831, was conducted at Dunsfold; at this stage of development, this feat had required the airframe to have been stripped of all extraneous weight and restrictions on the engine meant it could not be run at full power for more than 2.5 minutes at a time. Several tethered flights took place, partially so that the test pilots could familiarise themselves with the hovering controls; on 4 November, the first tethered flight without use of the auto-stabiliser system was accomplished. In mid-November, conventional taxying trials were performed at speeds of up to 70 knots (130 km/h).

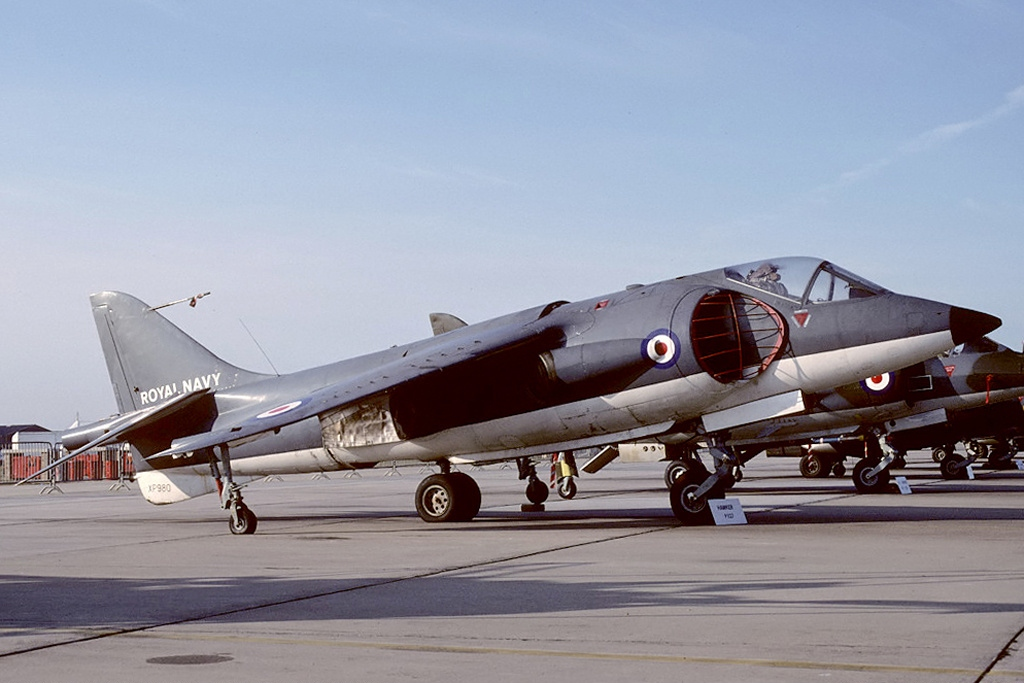
P.1127 XP980 in use as a deck handling trainer in Royal Navy markings, 1989

On 19 November 1960, the first un-tethered free-flight hover of XP831 was achieved; a week later, the first publicity photos of the P.1127 were released. Prior to the first flight, Hooker is claimed to have asked of Camm "I suppose you are going to do some conventional flying first Sydney?" and Camm replied "What for?" Hooker said "Well you know, just to make sure the aeroplane is a nice aeroplane, and everything under control." Camm replied, "Oh, Hawker aeroplanes are always beautiful, nothing wrong with a Hawker aeroplane, not going to bother with that. Vertical first time".

On 13 February 1961, XP831 performed its first conventional flight, flown by Bill Bedford and lasting for 22 minutes. Soon after this, XP831 was refitted with a new model of the Pegasus engine, capable of generating 12,000 lbf (53 kN) of thrust, prior to embarking on new hovering trials in May 1961. In June, XP831 attained another milestone in the program when it performed the first transition from vertical hover to horizontal flight, initially flying the length of Dunsfold's runway at a height of 50 meters.

On 7 July 1961, the second prototype, XP836, performed its first take off conventionally. Continuing tests of the two prototypes proceeded to close the gap between vertical take off and flight, a feat which was achieved on 8 September 1961. During September, the feat was repeated multiple times by both prototypes, transitioning from vertical to horizontal flight and vice versa, including instances in which the auto-stabiliser was intentionally disabled.

During the flight test program, the issuing of NATO Basic Military Requirement 3 (NBMR-3) did not prove to be the opportunity as envisioned by Hawker, as NBMR-3 sought performance characteristics of which the P.1127 was not only unable to meet, but unlikely to be developed to meet in its current form either. As such, in 1961, there was little military interest in the P.1127 program, although, in January 1961, Hawker was requested to provide a quote for the costs involved in a potential 100 production standard P.1127 aircraft. Meanwhile, Hawker believed that the continuing development of the P.1127 would serve a successful demonstration, acting to dissuade potential customers from pursuing competing 'paper' VTOL aircraft projects.

On 2 November 1960, the Ministry of Supply issued a contract for a further four prototypes to be produced, which were intended to develop the aircraft further towards being a realistic combat design, such as the refinement of the wing, engine improvements, and of accompanying operational equipment. Throughout this period, improved models of the Pegasus engine were rapidly developed, such as the Pegasus 3 being capable of 15,000 lbf (67 kN) of thrust. Apart from the improved powerplants, the first four P.1127 prototypes were quite similar; the fifth prototype, XP980, introduced the taller fin and tailplane anhedral which were later used on the production Harrier. The fourth machine was partially used to provide Hawker production test pilots with type familiarisation. The first carrier vertical landing was performed by the first prototype on HMS Ark Royal in 1963. The last P.1127, XP984, introduced the swept wing. It was eventually fitted with the 15,000 lbf (67 kN) Pegasus 5 and functioned as the prototype Kestrel.

The first three P.1127s crashed, the second and third occurring during development. In 1963, the first prototype, XP831, publicly crashed at the Paris Air Show; the accident had been caused by a speck of dirt in the air feed lines of the nozzle control motor, which had caused the engine nozzles to stick. XP831 was later fully repaired and resumed development flying. All the pilots involved survived.

=== Kestrel FGA.1 ===
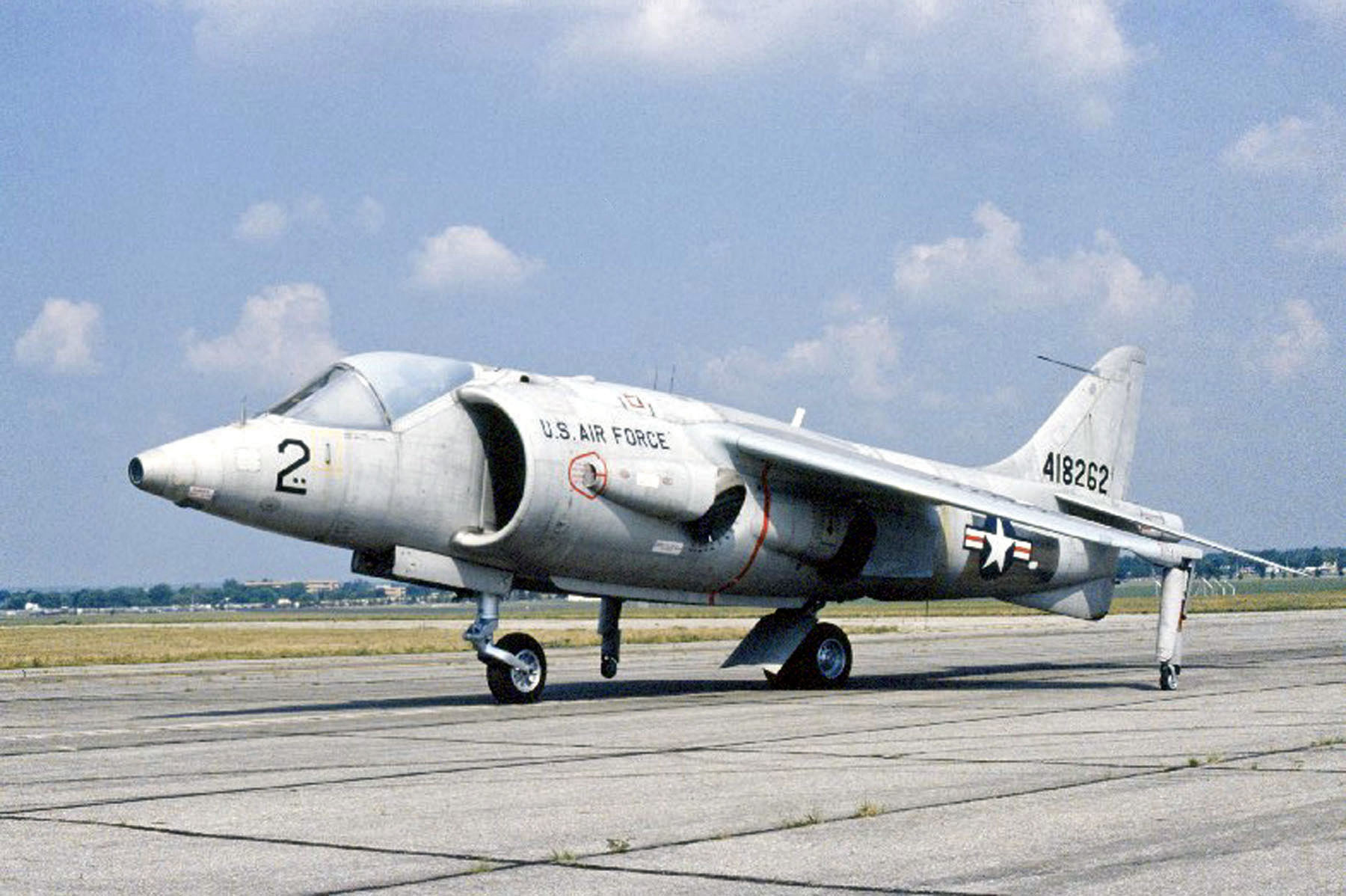
Hawker Siddeley XV-6A Kestrel in USAF livery

By late 1961, Hawker had been able to demonstrate the validity of its design concept, despite a lack of support from the RAF and little from the Civil Service. In early 1962, official support emerged in the form of the Operational Requirements branch of the Ministry of Aviation, which approached the Treasury seeking its sanction of a batch of nine production-standard aircraft to be operated by an evaluation unit to be administered by the Central Fighter Establishment at RAF West Raynham. In light of open interest expressed by figures within the U.S. and West Germany, the British government approached these nations with an offer to collaborate on the project and to seek contributions towards the cost involved. Following the acceptance of all three nations, on 22 May 1962, Hawker received a formal Instruction to Proceed with the procurement of materials for the construction of the nine aircraft.

The nine aircraft were ordered as the Kestrel FGA.1, which was essentially an improved version of the P.1127. On 7 March 1964, XS688 became the first Kestrel to conduct its maiden flight, flown by Bill Bedford. The Kestrel had fully swept wings and a larger tail than the early P.1127s, and the fuselage was modified to take the larger 15,000 lbf (67 kN) Pegasus 5 engine as in the P.1127/Kestrel prototype XP984, in addition to some other changes, such as addition of ultra high frequency (UHF) radio and assorted operational equipment in a bay house within the rear fuselage. Prior to the availability of the Kestrel for testing, a pair of NASA pilots visited Dunsfold to perform a complete set of handling trials using the earlier P.1127 in its place.

On 15 October 1964, the Tri-partite Evaluation Squadron (TES) was formed at RAF West Raynham, staffed by a diverse mix of military test pilots from Britain, the United States and West Germany. The personnel comprising the squadron were highly experienced pilots; prior to flying the Kestrel, each received a week's ground training at Bristol's in-house facility and a week's ground instruction at Dunsfold prior to a three-hour flight conversion instructed by Bill Bedford. The purpose of the squadron was to evaluate the suitability of V/STOL aircraft for field operations, compare competing styles and methods of taking off/landing, develop normal flight operating procedures, perform instrument flight assessments, conduct night flight operations, and explore jet-borne maneuvering throughout the Kestrel's flight envelope.

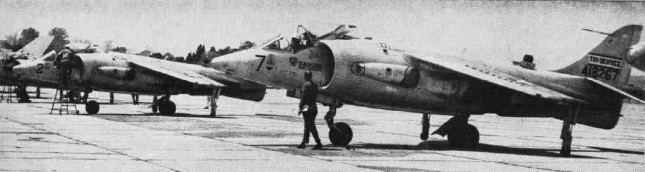
A pair of Kestrels at the Naval Air Station Patuxent River, Maryland, US, 1966

During the course of the evaluation, the Tri-partite pilots developed a typical sortie routine for the Kestrel of conducting short take-offs (STO) and returning to base on vertical landings. This manner of operation (STOVL) was judged to be the optimal practice. Operating from rough airstrips was also trialled at nearby RAF Bircham Newton, where the aircraft proved adept at traversing boggy ground and taking off from a variety of temporary ground coverings. During testing one aircraft was lost when a pilot tried to do a rolling take-off with the parking brake on; the evaluations were finalised in November 1965.

Six of the eight surviving evaluation aircraft (the three allocated to the U.S. plus those allocated to Germany) were transferred to the U.S. for evaluation by the Army, Air Force, and Navy as the XV-6A Kestrel. After Tri-Service evaluation they were passed to the USAF for further evaluation at Edwards Air Force Base, except for two that were assigned to NASA. One of the two remaining British-based Kestrels was attached to the Blind Landing Experimental Unit (BLEU) at RAE Bedford and the other, XS693, went to Blackburn for modification to take the uprated Pegasus 6 engine.

In addition to some strengthening, there were alterations to the air intake, which had throughout the P.1127 and Kestrel series featured an inflatable lip to smooth the intake airflow when the aircraft was almost stationary. There were concerns about the service life of these devices, so they were replaced with conventional suction relief doors. Experience gained during naval testing on board the commando carrier HMS Bulwark in 1966 convinced project officers that less reactive materials would be substituted for all uses of magnesium in the Kestrel's airframe, in any further prototypes and production aircraft. The Kestrel became the prototype for pre-production Harriers.

=== P.1127 (RAF) ===
In 1961, NATO issued NATO Basic Military Requirement 3 (NBMR-3) which specified a VTOL aircraft, albeit one with the supersonic performance of an aircraft such as the F-4 Phantom II, along with the VTOL capability. Recognising that the P.1127 would not satisfy this, Hawker commenced work upon a new project, designated P.1150, which was effectively a supersonic derivative of the P.1127, as well as another version, designated P.1154, which would meet the specified requirements of NBMR-3. The P.1154 was declared the winner of the NATO competition; prototype construction was already underway at the point of cancellation in 1965. The French government had withdrawn shortly after the P.1154's selection over the Dassault Mirage IIIV.

Following the termination of the P.1154, the RAF then began studying a straightforward upgrade of the Kestrel as a production aircraft; accordingly, it issued Requirement ASR 384, which sought a V/STOL ground attack jet, known as the P.1127 (RAF). In late 1965, the RAF placed an order for six pre-production P.1127 (RAF) aircraft. On 31 August 1966, the first of these P.1127 (RAF) aircraft made its maiden flight. In early 1967, an order for 60 production aircraft was formally received by Hawker Aviation; at this time the aircraft received the Harrier GR.1 designation. The Harrier went on to become a successful aircraft in British service, and was exported to several nations, often seeing usage as a carrier-based aircraft.

== Design ==
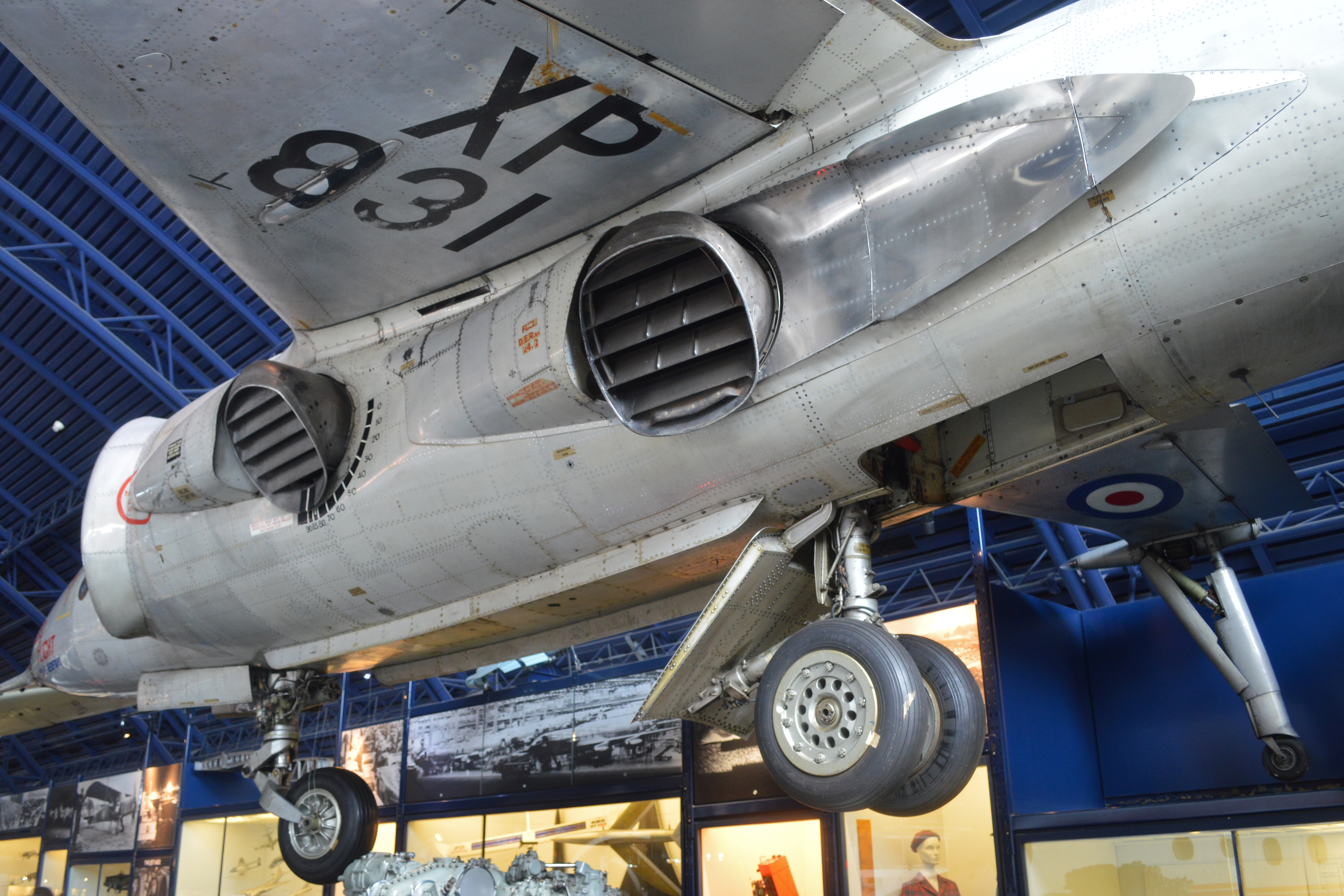
Port lower fuselage of the first prototype P.1127, showing the rotating jet nozzles

The P.1127/Kestrel was an experimental V/STOL aircraft, which served as the forerunner for the production of the Hawker Siddeley Harrier and the wider Harrier family. It served to demonstrate an entirely original technique of flight, as well as to trial a brand new type of engine in the form of the Pegasus turbofan engine. Despite this, the aircraft employed a principally conventional structure which, according to Mason, lent itself favourably to performing the intended ground attack operations envisioned for production aircraft.

The location of the large Pegasus engine, which was housed within the relatively small fuselage, meant that the cockpit was positioned directly forward of it, in between the later "elephant-ear" air intakes to the engine itself. The 'cold' jet exhaust was directed from the large fan forward of the engine compressor to rotatable fiberglass nozzles located on the sides of the main fuselage aft of the air intakes; the 'hot' jet exhaust from the rear of the engine was channeled via a bifurcated exhaust channel to two steel rotatable nozzles located somewhat aft of those used for the 'cold' jets. Additionally, bleed air was also extracted from the compressor and sent via ducts within the fuselage and wings to control nozzles, known as "puffers", located upon the aircraft's nose, tail, and wing tips, which were used for stabilisation during mid-air hovers.

The aircraft was furnished with a single-piece shoulder-mounted wing mounted across the top of the fuselage; the shape of the wing progressively alters from a clipped delta to a fully swept configuration, complete with extended leading edges and spaced out sawtooth extensions. A fully movable single-piece tailplane was also adopted, which was hinged upon the rear fuselage. The P.1127 had an atypical undercarriage arrangement, known as a "zero-track" tricycle undercarriage, which supported the majority of the aircraft's weight upon a pair of centrally mounted main wheels; steering was performed via a conventional nose wheel while balance was provided by a pair of wing tip-mounted outriggers.

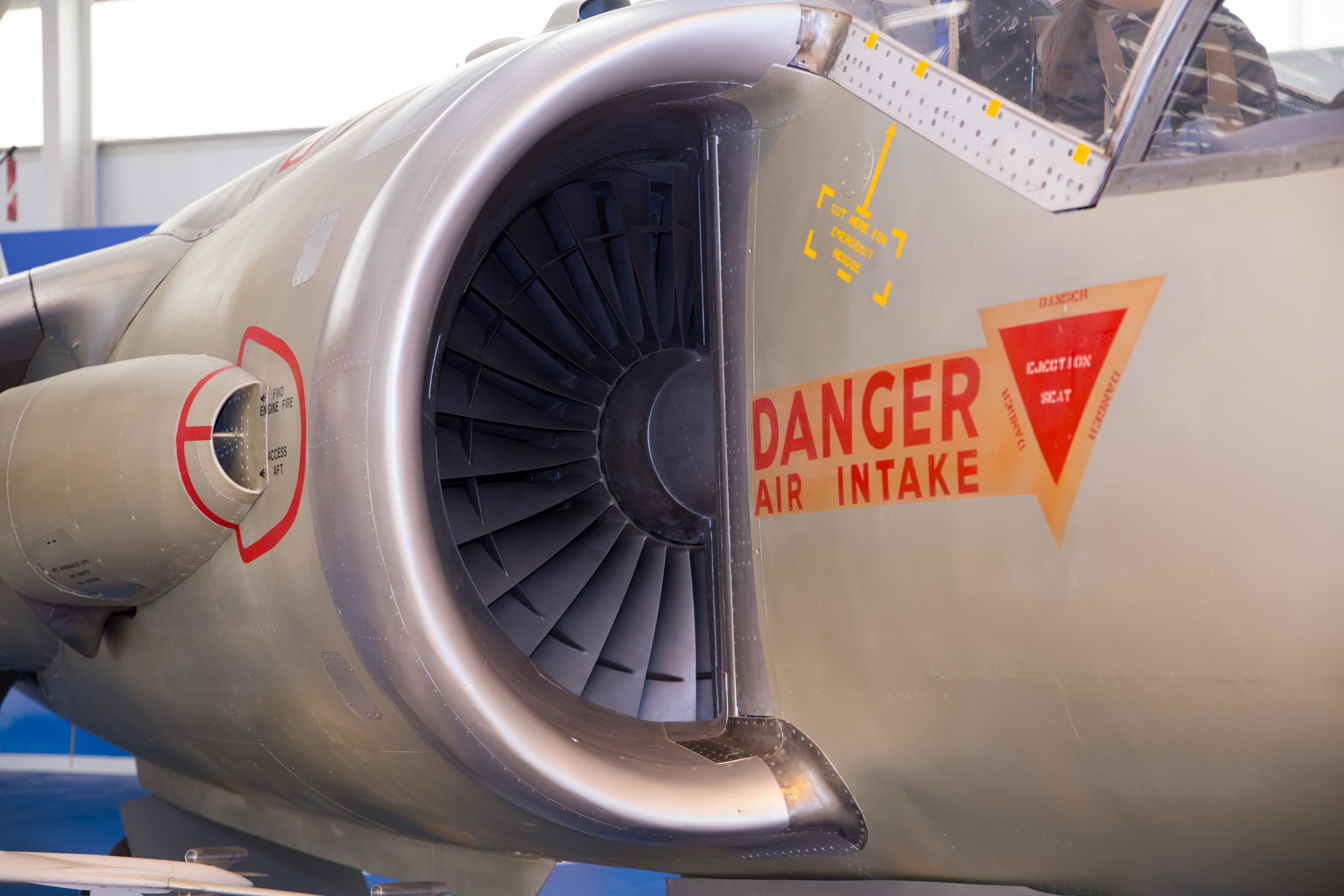
Air intake of a P.1127

The P.1127 was equipped with entirely conventional flying controls when operated within the normal flying regime; to avoid aerodynamic stall conditions when decelerating to slow speeds, control would be gradually and automatically transferred to the reaction jets, or "puffers", by bleeding more air from the compressor as the engine nozzles were moved towards the downwards position. An auto-stabilisation system was installed upon all aircraft; the necessity of such a feature is arguable, as countless transitions between vertical and horizontal flight were performed with the auto-stabiliser equipment being entirely disabled.

The P.1127 lacked any in-built armaments, the ethos of tactical flexibility meant a reliance upon underwing hard point-mounted munitions and equipment, which included multiple 2-inch (51 mm) rocket batteries, 30-mm ADEN cannon gun pods, and 1,000 lb (450 kg) bombs, napalm, and range-extending drop tanks. The prototypes were furnished with long nose-mounted instrumentation booms, which were replaced on the Kestrel with a much smaller counterpart on the fin to enable the nose to accommodate a tactical camera instead. An unusual feature of the P.1127 was the installation of a ram air turbine upon the rear fuselage just forward of the fin to provide power for ancillary services in the event of engine failure.

== Variants ==
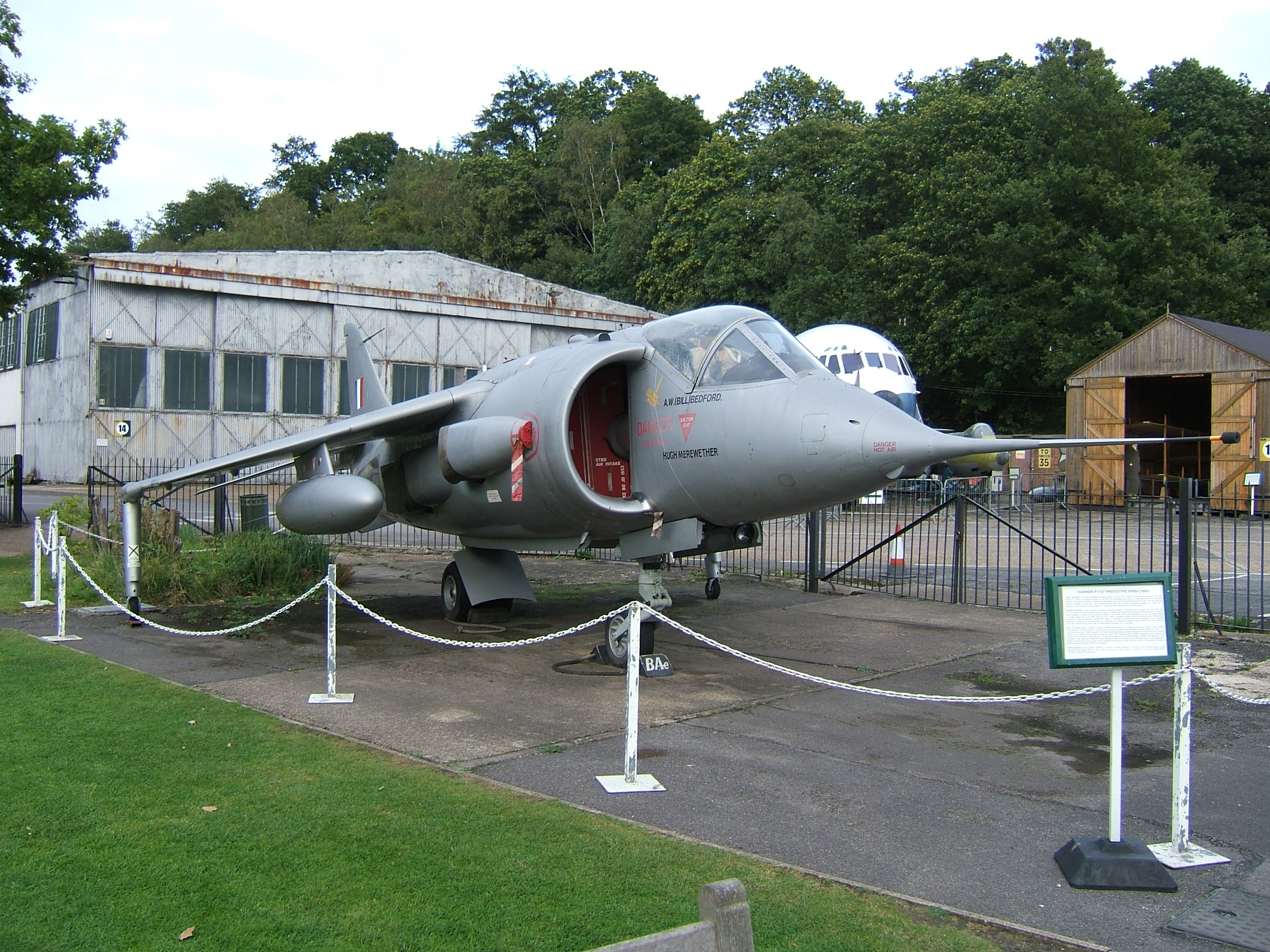
The last of the six P.1127 prototypes (XP984) and the only one retrofitted with a swept wing (seen here with an earlier straight wing). Later converted to the first Kestrel prototype with Pegasus 5 engine.

P.1127
Experimental V/STOL fighter, two prototypes and four development aircraft.
Kestrel FGA.1
Aircraft for the tripartite evaluation squadron, nine built, six later transferred to the United States where they were designated XV-6A.
P.1127 (RAF)
Development V/STOL ground attack and reconnaissance fighter, six built as pre-production evaluation aircraft before the type was ordered into production as the Harrier GR.1. First aircraft flew from Dunsfold on 31 August 1966.
XV-6A
United States military designation for the six Kestrel FGA.1 transferred to the U.S.
VZ-12
U.S. Army designation for two P.1127 development aircraft, not delivered.

== Operators ==
United Kingdom

- Aeroplane and Armament Experimental Establishment P.1127 and Kestrel trials and evaluation
- Royal Air Force
  - Central Fighter Establishment – Kestrel (P.1127) Evaluation Squadron (also known as the Tripartite Evaluation Squadron), nine Kestrel aircraft allocated for evaluation in 1965. One aircraft was lost in an accident, six aircraft later passed to the United States Army, one to the Royal Aircraft Establishment and one to Hawker Siddeley for further trials.
- Royal Aircraft Establishment P.1127 and Kestrel trials and evaluation.

United States

- United States Army (aircrew participated in both the Tri-partite Evaluation Squadron and as part of the American XV-6A Tri-service evaluation team. Had three Kestrel aircraft allocated after the evaluation at West Raynham and also acquired the three allocated to Germany. Four later transferred to the United States Air Force and two to the National Aeronautics and Space Administration).
- United States Air Force (aircrew participated in both the Tri-partite Evaluation Squadron and as part of the American XV-6A Tri-service evaluation team but had no aircraft allocated after the evaluation at West Raynham, four former United States Army aircraft operated for trials).
- United States Navy (aircrew participated in both the Tri-partite Evaluation Squadron and as part of the American XV-6A Tri-service evaluation team but had no aircraft allocated after the evaluation).
- NASA operated two former United States Army Kestrels.

West Germany

- German Air Force (Luftwaffe) (aircrew participated in the Tri-partite Evaluation Squadron, three allocated Kestrel aircraft not delivered and passed to United States Army)

== Aircraft on display ==
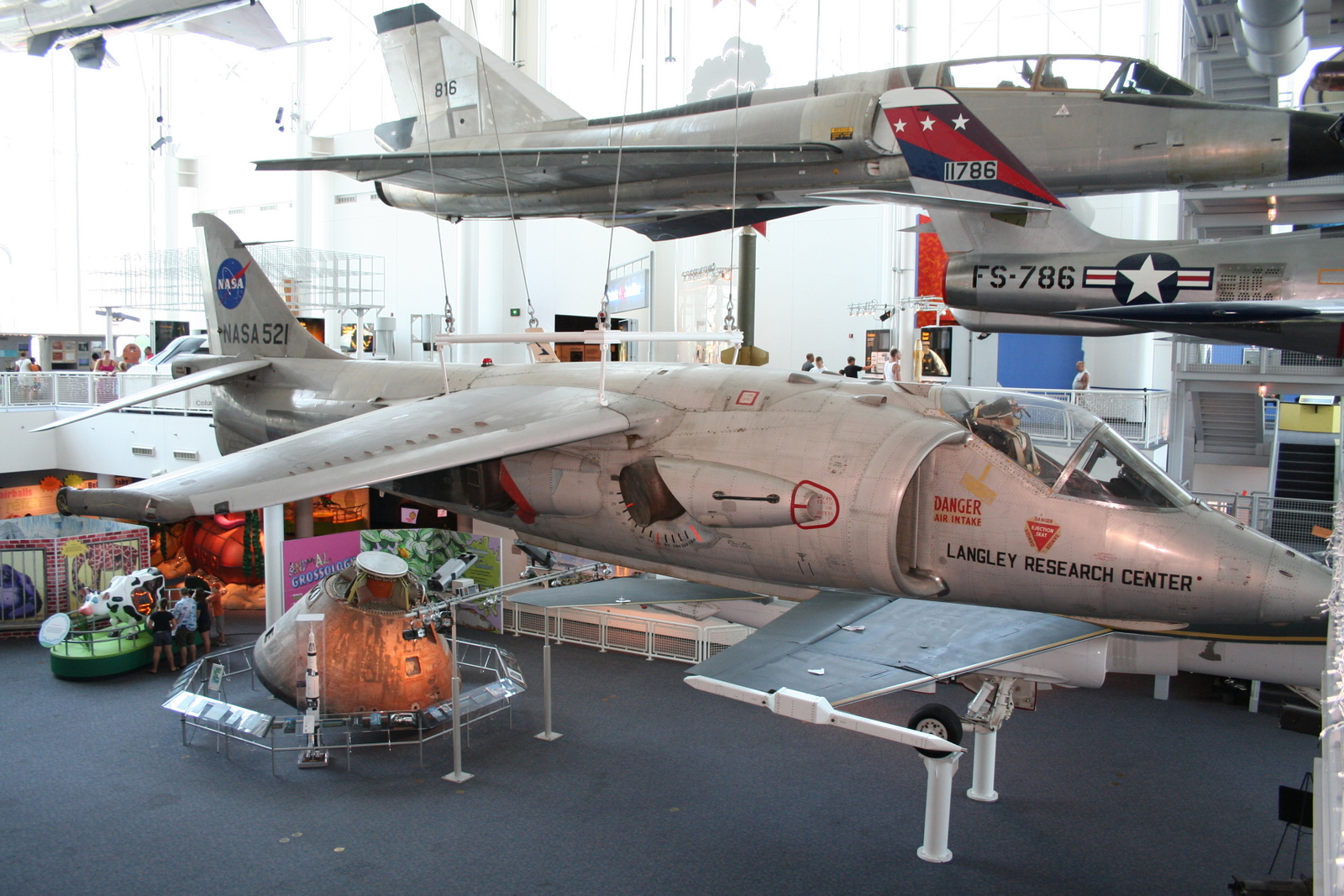
XV-6A Kestrel on display at the Virginia Air and Space Center

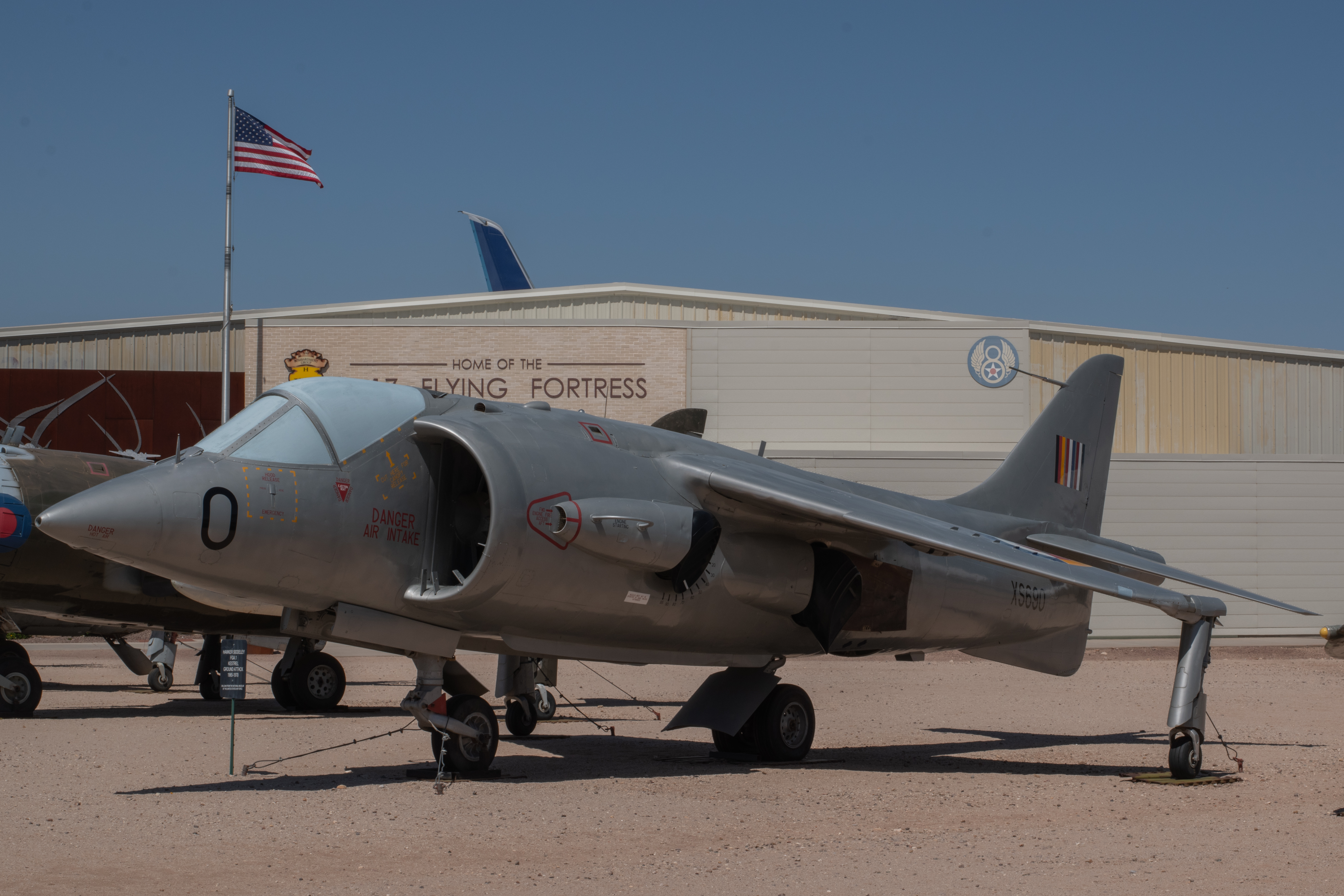
XV-6A 64-18264 at the Pima Air and Space Museum in 2026

- P.1127 XP831 on display at The Science Museum, London, England.
- P.1127 XP980 (fitted with a Harrier GR.1 wing) is on display at the Fleet Air Arm Museum, Yeovilton, England.
- P.1127 XP984 (restored with a Harrier GR.1 wing as flown in 1966 for handling and flutter checks in 2016) is on display at the Brooklands Museum, Surrey, England.
- Kestrel FGA.1 XS695 on display at the Royal Air Force Museum Cosford England.
- Kestrel FGA.1 XS694 Currently under restoration at Wings Museum England, former NASA 520 Aircraft
- XV-6A Kestrel 64-18262 on display at the National Museum of the United States Air Force at Wright-Patterson AFB, Ohio, United States.
- XV-6A Kestrel 64-18263 with NASA livery on display at the Virginia Air and Space Center, Hampton, Virginia, United States
- XV-6A Kestrel 64-18264 formerly held in storage by the United States Army Aviation Museum, Alabama, United States; now on display at the Pima Air & Space Museum in Tucson, Arizona.
- XV-6A Kestrel 64-18266 with NASA livery on display at Air Power Park, Hampton, Virginia, United States.

== Specifications (Kestrel FGA.1) ==
Data from Hawker Aircraft since 1920 The Hawker P.1127 and Kestrel

General characteristics

- Crew: 1
- Length: 42 ft 6 in (12.95 m)
- Wingspan: 22 ft 11 in (6.99 m)
- Height: 10 ft 9 in (3.28 m)
- Empty weight: 9,800 lb (4,445 kg)
- Gross weight: 14,000 lb (6,350 kg) VTO
- Max takeoff weight: 17,000 lb (7,711 kg) STO
- Powerplant: 1 × Bristol Siddeley Pegasus 5 vectored-thrust turbofan engine, 15,000 lbf (67 kN) thrust

Performance

- Maximum speed: 617 kn (710 mph, 1,143 km/h)
- Maximum speed: Mach 0.92
- Service ceiling: 55,000 ft (17,000 m)
- Rate of climb: 30,000 ft/min (150 m/s)
- Power/mass: 1.04

Armament

- Hardpoints: 2 wing pylons , with provisions to carry combinations of:
  - Rockets: 2 × 19 round 2.7" (68 mm) SNEB launchers / 2 × 32-round 2" (51 mm) Microcell launchers

== See also ==
- Harrier jump jet, an overview of the Harrier family
- Ralph Hooper

Related development

- Hawker Siddeley P.1154
- Hawker Siddeley Harrier
- Short SC.1

Aircraft of comparable role, configuration, and era

- Bell X-14
- Hunting H.126
- Ryan XV-5 Vertifan
- VFW VAK 191B
- Yakovlev Yak-36

Related lists

- List of VTOL aircraft
