= Wings Museum =

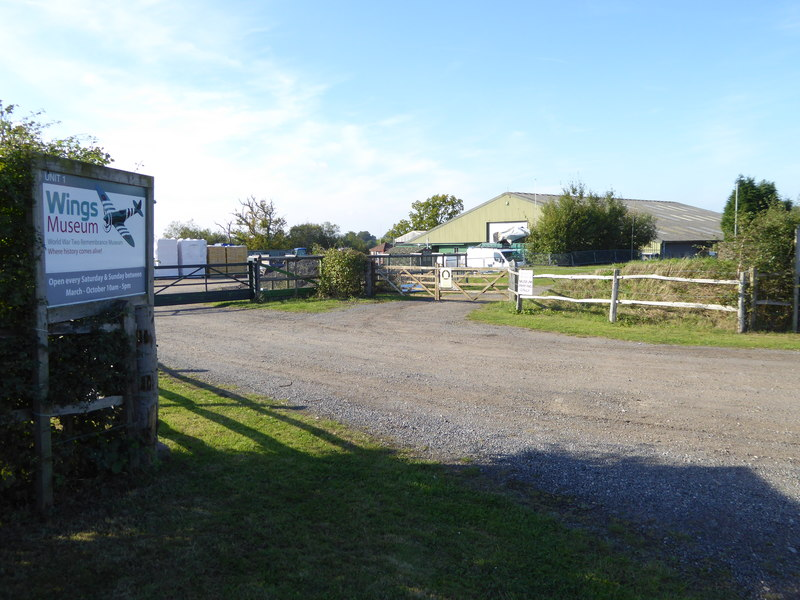
- Wings Museum entrance on Brantridge Lane
- Location: Balcombe, West Sussex
- Coordinates: 51.0603°N 0.1684°W
- Type: Aviation museum
- Website: www.wingsmuseum.co.uk

The Wings Museum is an aviation museum located in Sussex, United Kingdom. It is housed in a 12,000 square feet (1,100 m^{2}) hangar-like former farm building in Brantridge Lane, between Handcross and Balcombe. The museum displays mainly World War II-related flying memorabilia and equipment which have been donated, or which have been recovered and restored by volunteers.

== History ==
The museum was originally located at Redhill Aerodrome. By 2011 it had relocated to Brantridge Lane.

In 2013, the museum hosted a fundraiser for the upkeep of the Bomber Command Memorial in nearby Green Park.

In 2015, volunteers restored a Bristol Beaufighter Mk1f which had crashed 75 years earlier.

== Aircraft collection ==
Visitors to the museum can walk inside a complete fuselage from a Douglas C-47 Dakota which was used on D-Day and later during the filming of the television series Band of Brothers.

There are some very rare aircraft from World War II and some of them are the only ones of their type in the UK.

=== Turbine engine aircraft ===
- Hawker Siddeley Kestrel XS694 (under restoration and parts in storage)

=== Piston engine aircraft ===
- North American B-25J-25-NC 44-30861 (under restoration)
- Bell P-63 King cobra - 43-11137 (under restoration); the museum has five more in storage
- Douglas A-20 Boston (displayed as found)
- Nakajima B5N2 Kate (very large fuselage and wing section)
- Douglas C-47 Dakota (fuselage from Band of Brothers)
- Hawker Hurricane (wreck)
- Handley Page Hampden TB.1 P1273 (wreck)

=== Aircraft cockpits ===
- Douglas A-26 Invader 43–22649
- Bristol Beaufighter 1f
- Curtis Helldiver SB2C-5 (in storage)
- Jet Provost XM486 (in storage)
- English Electric Canberra (in storage)
- De Havilland Chipmunk WD377
- North American B-25 Mitchell

=== Simulators ===
- Link trainer

=== Piston engines ===
- Rolls-Royce Merlin ×5 (one running as a living memorial)
- Junkers Jumo 211
- Daimler Benz 610

== See also ==
- List of aerospace museums
