= Fokker/Republic D-24 Alliance =

Supersonic variable-sweep wing concept aircraft

D.24 Alliance

General information
- Type: VTOL strike fighter
- Manufacturer: Fokker/Republic Aviation

The Fokker/Republic D.24 was a supersonic variable-sweep wing concept aircraft designed from 1962 to 1968 by the Fokker-Republic Alliance, a coalition between Fokker and Republic Aviation. The project was based out of Schiphol, Netherlands, and led by Alexander Wadkowski of Republic Aviation.

== Design ==
The D.24 was designed to be capable of vertical take-off and landing (VTOL) and was designed in accordance with NATO Basic Military Requirement 3 and competed in NATO's BMR-3 military project bidding. Only a scale model was built and is now located at the Luchtvaartmuseum Aviodrome in Lelystad, Netherlands.

== Specifications ==
General characteristics

- Crew: 1
- Powerplant: 1 × Bristol Siddeley BS.100 vectored-thrust turbofan engine for lift/cruise

Performance

- Maximum speed: Mach 1.5 at sea level, Mach 2.4 at 70,000 feet
- Range: 4,828 km (3,000 mi, 2,607 nmi)
- Service ceiling: 21,336 m (70,000 ft)

== See also ==
- List of VTOL aircraft
