= Bristol Siddeley BS.100 =

1960s British turbofan aircraft engine

BS.100
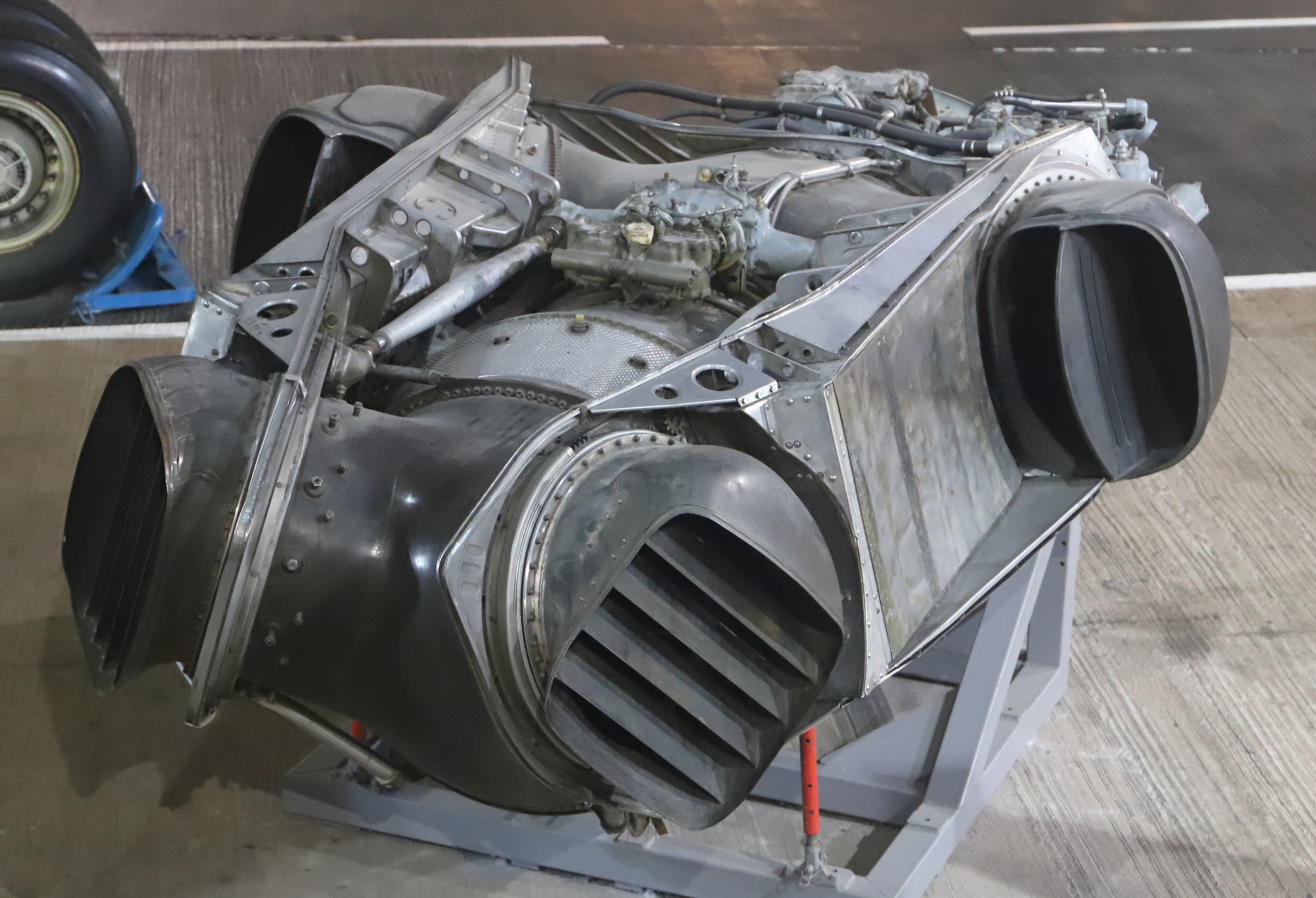
- Bristol Siddeley BS.100 on display at the Fleet Air Arm Museum.
- Type: Vectored thrust turbofan
- Manufacturer: Bristol Siddeley Engines Limited
- First run: 1960
- Major applications: Hawker Siddeley P.1154 (intended)
- Number built: 6

The Bristol Siddeley BS.100 is a British twin-spool, vectored thrust, turbofan aero engine that first ran in 1960. The engine was designed and built in limited numbers by Bristol Siddeley Engines Limited. The project was cancelled in early 1965.

== Design and development ==
Based on the 300-series Olympus, the BS.100 was similar in general arrangement to that of the company's Pegasus design, but with the addition of plenum chamber burning (PCB), to enable the projected Hawker Siddeley P.1154 VSTOL fighter design to accelerate to supersonic speed and to allow the aircraft to hover.

PCB is similar to reheat, but combustion is only applied to the bypass air (i.e. the front nozzles). PCB was quite difficult to develop since combustion had to occur on the bends between fan exit and entry to the two vectoring front nozzles and at much lower inlet pressure and temperature than a conventional afterburner. The PCB flame-holders were highly complex sheet metal fabrications which were difficult to envisage on a 2D engineering drawing. Consequently 3D models in wood had to be produced to aid development of the system.

Variable area front nozzles were required. This was to be achieved by movable ramps mounted horizontally on the fuselage between the front and rear nozzles. For vertical flight and subsonic cruise, the nozzle area would be large, whereas with the PCB lit during acceleration to supersonic speed the ramps would be expanded, reducing flow to the front nozzles and diverting more flow into the core.

Although PCB ran on a Pegasus 2 development engine, it was never fitted to any of the BS.100-8 engines that were built and never flew.

The BS.100 was also intended for the Fokker Republic D-24.

== Variants ==
A range of BS.100 engines were studied in the early 1960s, but it was the BS.100-8 that was finally selected for development manufacture and was actually built.

== Engines on display ==
A preserved Bristol Siddeley BS.100 is on public display at the Fleet Air Arm Museum, RNAS Yeovilton.

== Specifications (BS.100-8) ==
Data from Pegasus:The Heart Of The Harrier.

==== General characteristics ====
- Type: Vectored thrust after-burning turbofan with Plenum Chamber Burning (PCB)
- Length: 107 in (2,700 mm) fan entry to exhaust cone truncation
- Diameter: 52 in (1,300 mm) fan
- Dry weight:

==== Components ====
- Compressor: Two-spool axial flow, 4-stage LP compressor fan, with 7-stage HP compressor
- Turbine: HP cooled single-stage with 2-stage uncooled LP turbines
- Fuel type: Kerosene

==== Performance ====
- Maximum thrust:
  - 26,200 lbf (116.5 kN) PCB off
  - 33,140 lbf (147.4 kN) normal lift thrust, PCB on, 20 second rating
  - 35,170 lbf (156.4 kN) short lift thrust, PCB on, 140 second rating
- Overall pressure ratio: 11.45:1
- Bypass ratio: 0.934:1
- Air mass flow: 490 lb/s (220 kg/s)
- Turbine inlet temperature: 1,447K short lift
- Specific fuel consumption: 0.773 lb/(lbf.h)21.9g/(kN.s) PCB off

== See also ==
Related development

- Rolls-Royce Pegasus

Comparable engines

- Rolls-Royce/MAN Turbo RB193

Related lists

- List of aircraft engines
