= Zero stage =

A zero stage, sometimes written '0' stage, is an additional compressor stage added to the front of jet engines and other gas turbine engines to increase their performance. This addition serves to enhance engine efficiency by increasing both the cycle overall pressure ratio and the core mass flow, without altering the engine's core dimensions. In cases where further performance enhancement is required, a subsequent stage may be added in front of the initial zero stage, designated as a zero–zero stage.

This technique, zero-staging, is often utilized in conjunction with other engine modifications to achieve higher thrust or reduce turbine operating temperatures. This is particularly relevant when adapting engines for increased aircraft weight or novel applications. For example, in situations where an aircraft's design is modified to accommodate heavier loads, zero-staging can provide the necessary thrust augmentation without necessitating a complete engine replacement, offering a more efficient and cost-effective upgrade.

== Examples ==
A comparison with other ways of uprating an existing engine without drastically redesigning the engine shows for a particular case, e.g. the Rolls-Royce/SNECMA M45H, the thrust could have been increased by 25% with a zero-staged low-pressure (LP) compressor or 10% with either an improved high-pressure (HP) turbine or with water injection.

A 15-stage Rolls-Royce Avon powered the Lightning F.1. A zero stage, together with a new turbine, was added (total 16 stages) for the Caravelle III. A zero–zero stage was added (total 17 stages) for the Caravelle VI.

The 7-stage Snecma Atar D was used in the Mystere II. A zero stage was added (total 8 stages) for the E and G used in the Vautour and Super Mystere B.2. A zero–zero stage (total 9 stages), together with a two-stage turbine was added for the Atar 8 and 9 used in the Mirage III.

The Rolls-Royce/Snecma Olympus 593 started with a six-stage LP compressor. As the Concorde increased in weight during the design phase the take-off thrust requirement increased. The engine was given a zero stage to the compressor, a redesigned turbine and partial reheat.

Examples of zero-staging for land-based gas turbines are the aeroderivative GE LM2500+ and the heavy-duty GE MS5002B. An alternative to zero-staging used by some OEMs is supercharging the compressor with a fan driven by an electric motor.

== Improved overall pressure ratio ==
Zero-staging is demonstrated by the following relationship:

$w_2 = (w_2 \frac{\sqrt{T_3}}{P_3}) \times (\frac{P_3}{P_2}) \times (\sqrt{\frac{T_2}{T_3}}) \times (\frac{P_2}{\sqrt{T_2}}) \,$

where:

core mass flow = $w_2 \,$

core size =$(w_2 \frac{\sqrt{T_3}}{P_3}) \,$

core total head pressure ratio = $(\frac{P_3}{P_2}) \,$

inverse of core total head temperature ratio = $\frac{T_2}{T_3} \,$ i.e. ($\frac{P_3}{P_2} \,$)

core entry total pressure = $P_2 \,$

core entry total temperature = $T_2 \,$

So basically, increasing $\frac{P_3}{P_2} \,$ increases $w_2 \,$.

On the other hand, adding a stage to the rear of the compressor increases overall pressure ratio, and decreases core size, but has no effect on core flow. This option also needs a Turbine with a significantly smaller flow capacity to drive the compressor.

Zero-staging a compressor also implies an increase in shaft speed:

$N_2 = (N_2 \sqrt{T_3}) \times \sqrt{T_3} \,$

where:

HP shaft speed = $N_2 \,$

HP compressor "non-dimensional" speed (based on exit total temperature) = $(N_2 \sqrt{T_3}) \,$

HP compressor exit total temperature = $T_3 \,$

So if the "non-dimensional" Speed of the original compressor is to be maintained, increasing $T_3 \,$ increases $N_2 \,$. This implies an increase in both the blade and disc stress levels.

If the original shaft speed is maintained, then the increase in pressure ratio and mass flow from adding the zero stage will be severely reduced.

Although the above equations are written with zero-staging an HP compressor in mind, the same approach would apply to an LP or intermediate-pressure (IP) compressor.
