= Hunting H.126 =

British experimental blown flap aircraft

H.126
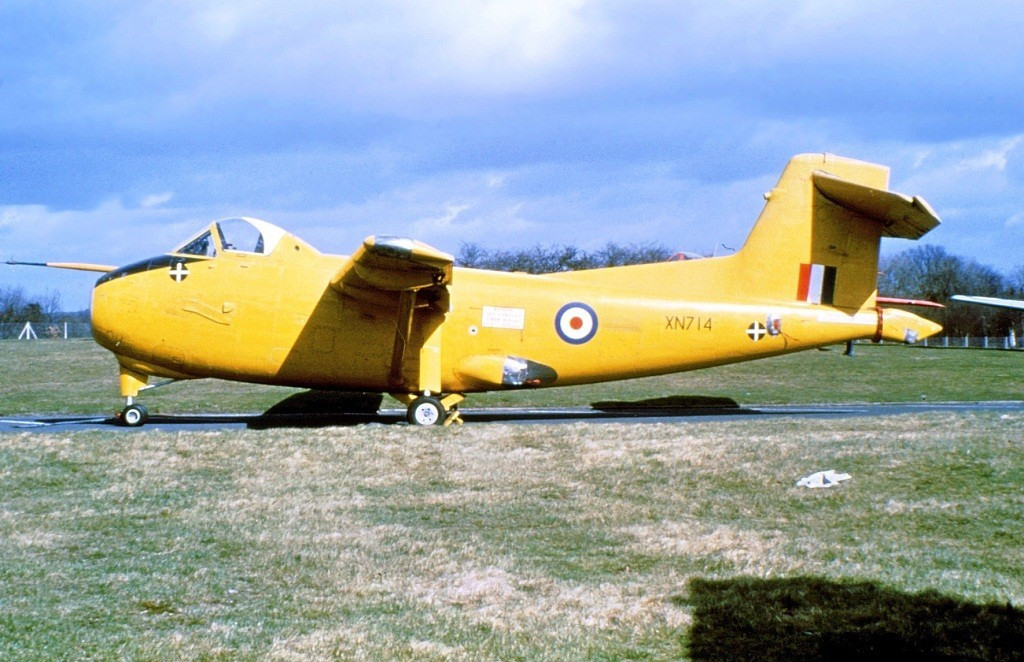
- Hunting H.126 at the RAF Museum Cosford (1976)

General information
- Type: research aircraft
- National origin: United Kingdom
- Manufacturer: Hunting Aircraft
- Primary user: Royal Aircraft Establishment
- Number built: 1

History
- First flight: 26 March 1963

The Hunting H.126 is an experimental aircraft that was designed and built by British aviation company Hunting Aircraft.

The aircraft was developed in order to test the performance of blown flaps, which were commonly known in Britain as "jet flaps", At the time, they were a relatively unknown quantity, thus the Ministry of Aviation issued Specification ER.189D for an appropriate research aircraft to be developed. During 1959, Hunting Aircraft was selected, being awarded a contract to construct a pair of aircraft. The first aircraft, serial number XN714, was completed during mid-1962 and initial ground testing commenced during the latter part of the year. This aircraft performed its maiden flight on 26 March 1963.

Only the single aircraft was ever completed, the second being cancelled mid-construction. Following the completion of preliminary flights, XN714 was used to conduct a series of one hundred test flights at the Royal Aircraft Establishment's Aerodynamics Flight at RAE Bedford, the last of which being performed in 1967. XN714 was transported to the United States during 1969, where it underwent wind tunnel testing by NASA; following its return to the UK, the aircraft was officially withdrawn in 1972. Presently, the preserved aircraft is on static display at the Royal Air Force Museum Cosford.

== Development ==
During the late 1940s, multiple British research institutions, including the National Gas Turbine Establishment (NGTE), the Royal Aircraft Establishment (RAE) and various aircraft manufacturers, became interested in the potential applications of the recent innovation of blown flaps, or as they were known in Britain, "jet flaps". Out of this work, it became recognised that a major benefit of jet flaps would be substantially lower take-off and landing speeds for aircraft. In 1951, the principle of the jet flap was successfully patented by the NGTE.

In order to greater explore and validate the "jet flap principle", the Ministry of Aviation issued Specification ER.189D, which called for the development of a dedicated purpose-built aircraft with which to perform a full-scale investigation. During 1959, Hunting Aircraft was awarded a contract to construct a pair of aircraft. According to aviation periodical Flight International, a contributing reason for Hunting Aircraft's decision to respond to the Specification was the firm's existing experience in the operation of hot-gas ducting systems, which had been acquired by its previous research activities into helicopters.

Manufacture of the H.126 was completed during summer 1962, being formally rolled out in August of that year. After completing limited taxying trials at Luton Airport, the aircraft was dismantled and transported by road to RAE Bedford, where it was reassembled and readied for flight.

== Design ==
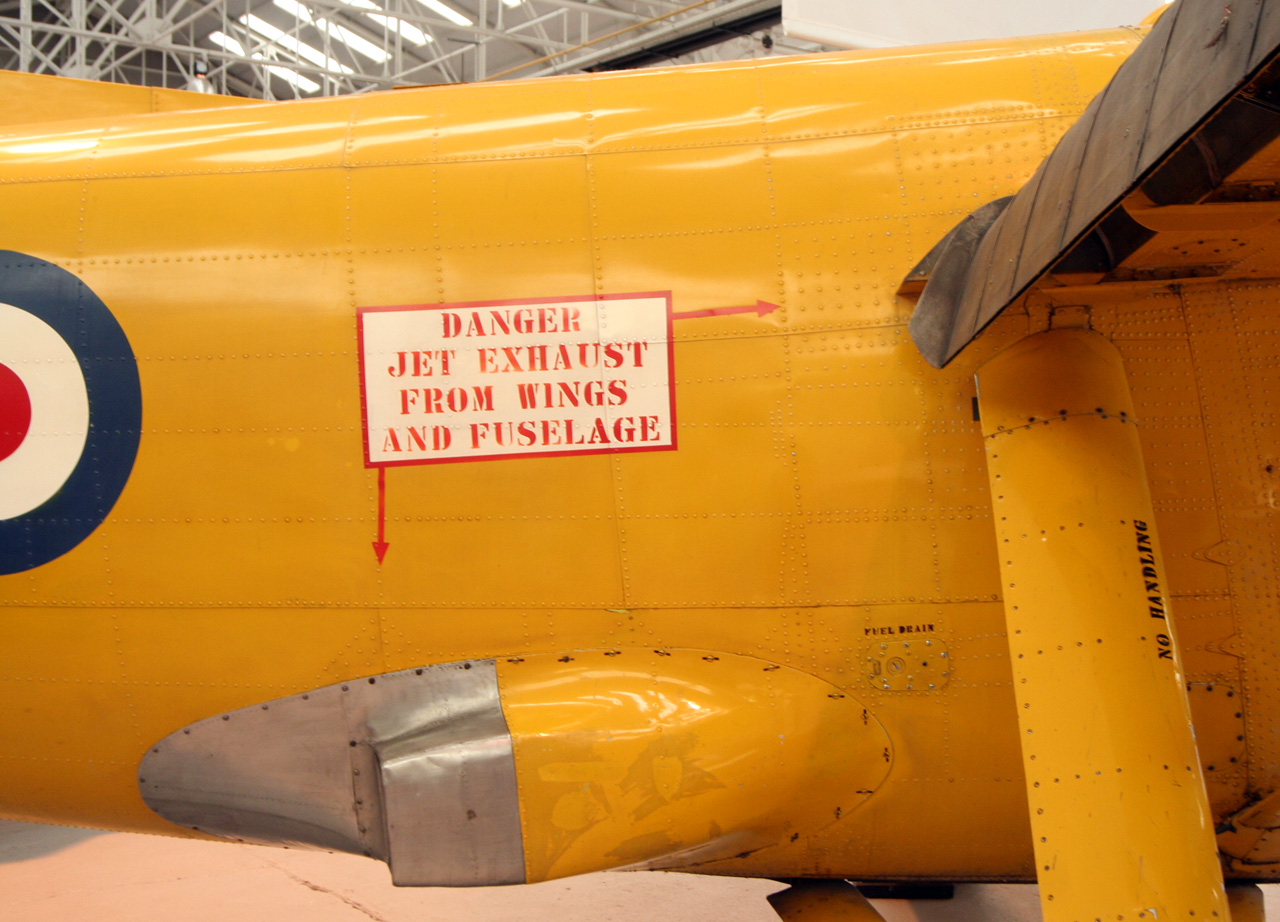
Close view of a fuselage nozzle and the blown flaps

The Hunting H.126 is highly unorthodox aircraft; according to Flight, development "posed numerous aerodynamic, thermodynamic and structural problems... the ducting of hot gases, large changes of trim which occur with such a large variation in lift coefficient, and the inter-relation between control jets... and the conventional elevator and rudder controls". Despite this, several aspects of the aircraft, such as its fixed nosewheel undercarriage, were relatively conventional. There was a deliberate effort to avoid unnecessary complexity, partially as it was felt that testing of the jet flap concept should be carried out in several manageable stages.

The cockpit is situated directly above the engine compartment. While furnished with oxygen apparatus and a Martin-Baker-built ejection seat, the cockpit was unpressurized. Due to its use as a test plane, it was outfitted with extensive test instrumentation, much of the rear fuselage space was occupied by the instrumentation, sensors, and recording equipment; in particular, due to heat concerns, extensive temperature monitoring was carried out at various locations across the airframe. The flight controls, mainly the control column and rudder pedals, operated both the conventional control surfaces and the jet nozzles present in the aircraft's tail, the latter controlling both pitch and yaw. The wingtip nozzles, which controlled roll, were operated by an auto-stabilizer system. The variable-incidence tailplane is hydraulically actuated and was directly linked to the elevators to vary the tail unit's effective camber. The ailerons were able to droop, providing a full-span jet flap.

The H.126 was powered by a single Bristol Orpheus turbojet engine. All engine thrust was ducted through to a vertical distribution manifold, the top of which featured three ducts on each side leading into the wing to reach a total of eight fishtails, from which exhaust would be directed over the full span of both the flaps and ailerons; one of the wing ducts also supplies the roll-jet nozzle at the wing tip. The base of the manifold had an additional bifurcated duct that ran aft through either side of the fuselage, providing additional thrust to supplement the fishtails in the wing; these two jet nozzles could be furnished with pilot-controlled spoilers. A further duct from the manifold supplies the pitch and yaw control nozzles present in the tail unit, as well as another duct for a pitch-trim nozzle. The extensive ducting necessitated careful insulation and heat-shielding to safely contain the hot gasses; despite this, traditional lightweight alloys were used extensively across the main structure, save for a few critical points.

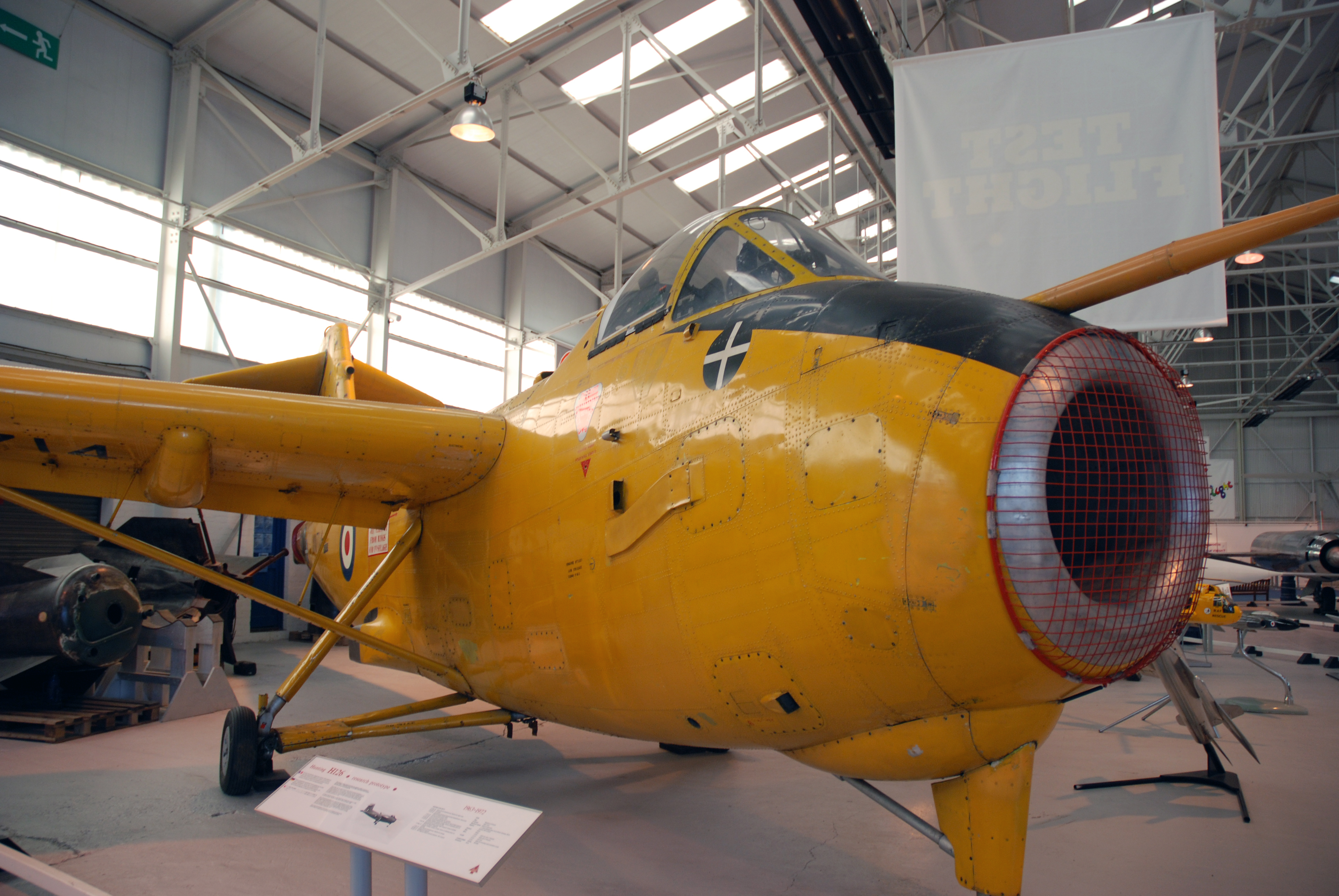
View of the nose and forward fuselage

The fuselage is of conventional stressed-skin construction, the structuring being a mix of longitudinal members and vertical frames, reinforced at key areas such as the wings, undercarriage and engine mounting. The aircraft's shoulder-level wing featured a set of struts, not for support but in order to provide piping for the compressed air used in the blown flaps. The mainplanes used a two-spar construction approach, supported by a single strut and attached via pin-joints to the fuselage; both the wing and strut attachments were designed to facilitate two alternative dihedral angles (4° or 8°). Each aileron features five hinges, while cooling air was also circulated via slots in the leading and trailing edges; the flaps are of a similar construction. The two-spar tailplane was pivoted at its rear spar, while four elevator hinges were attached to the rear spar.

The rear control surfaces consisted of a fairly small triangular T-tail, similar to the one on the Gloster Javelin. The jet flap system consisted of a series of sixteen nozzles arranged along the trailing edge of the wing, which were fed about half of the engine's hot exhaust gases. A smaller amount, about 10%, was also fed into small nozzles on the wing tips to provide control thrust at low speeds. A similar system was later used on the Hawker Siddeley Harrier for similar reasons. This left little power for forward thrust, and the aircraft was limited to low speeds, but the takeoff speed was a mere 32 mph (51 km/h), a speed most light aircraft would have trouble matching.

== Operational history ==
On 26 March 1963, the maiden flight of the first Hunting H.126, serial number XN714, occurred. Flown from RAE Bedford (presently Bedford Aerodrome, it was piloted by S. B. Oliver, Hunting Aircraft's chief test pilot. Speaking shortly after this flight, Oliver stated that it was "A perfect, no-snags flight... Taking this plane off is an entirely new sensation; it just floats off the ground, and then you go up like a lift."

Prior to the XN714 being formally delivered to its owners, the Ministry of Aviation, Hunting operated the aircraft themselves for several months to conduct preliminary flying. It was painted overall yellow with a matt black anti-glare area on the nose in front of the cockpit. The second aircraft XN719 was never completed and was ultimately scrapped. The RAE's test flight programme were carried out between 1963 and 1967, during which valuable data on the concept was gathered across 100 separate sorties. During 1969, the aircraft was shipped to the United States, where it underwent further testing by NASA; it was subsequently returned to Britain in May 1970. For several years, it stayed in storage in case the aircraft would be needed for further research; during September 1972, it was formally "struck off charge" from the RAF records. In 1974, the aircraft was transferred to the RAF Museum; it has since gone on static display.

When an Orpheus engine from a Folland Gnat was loaned to Donald Campbell, for his water-speed record hydroplane Bluebird, the Rotax air starter, pressure bottles and ground APU intended for the second H.126 were 'borrowed' by the Bluebird team.

== Operators ==
United Kingdom

- Royal Aircraft Establishment

== Specifications (H.126) ==
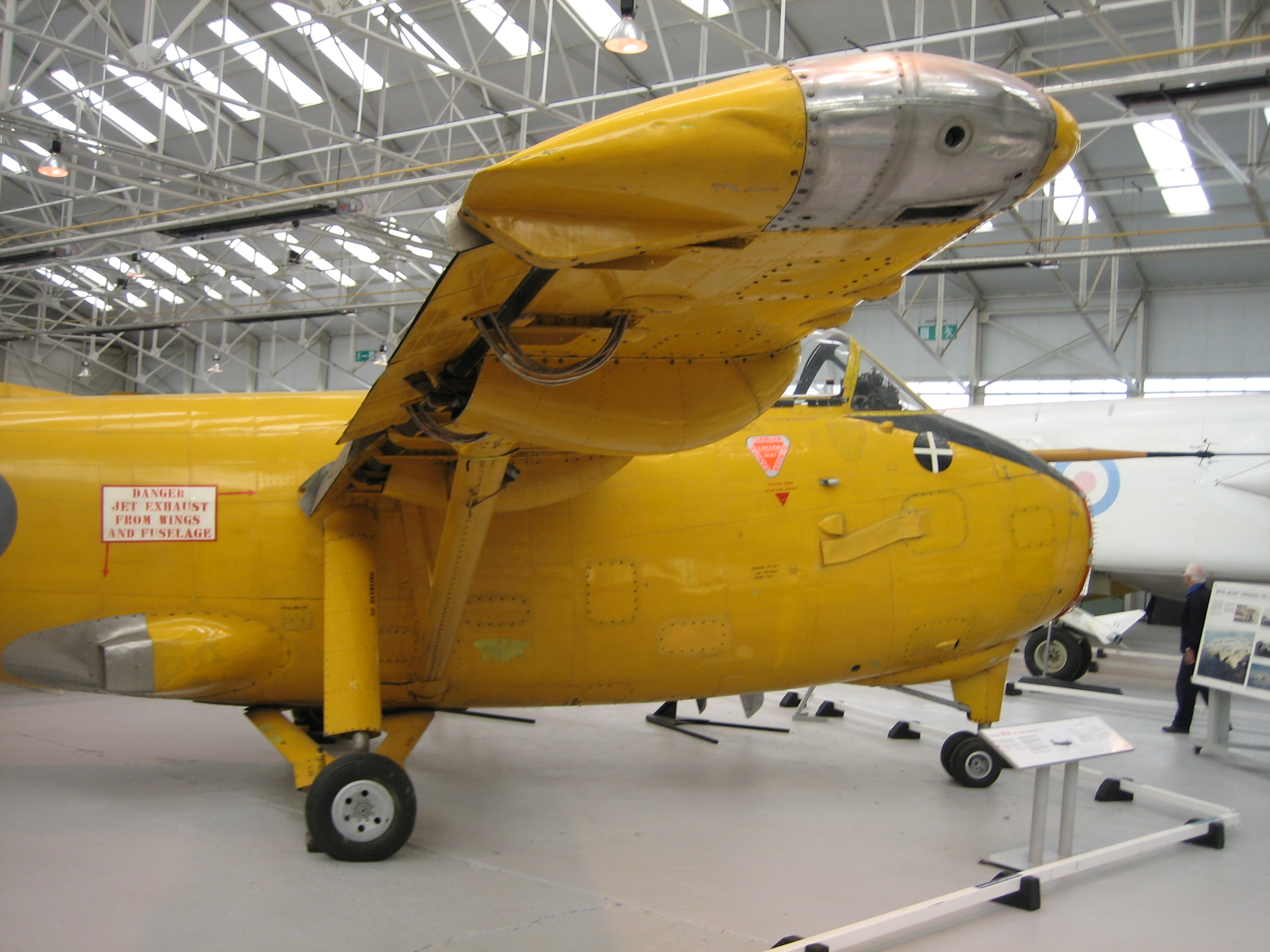
The H.126's blown flaps, wing tip thrusters and main exhausts are seen here

Data from Jane's Pocket Book of Research and Experimental Aircraft

General characteristics

- Crew: 1
- Length: 50 ft 2 in (15.29 m)
- Wingspan: 45 ft 4 in (13.82 m)
- Height: 15 ft 6 in (4.72 m)
- Wing area: 221 sq ft (20.5 m^{2})
- Airfoil: NACA 4424
- Empty weight: 8,240 lb (3,738 kg)
- Max takeoff weight: 10,740 lb (4,872 kg)
- Powerplant: 1 × Bristol Siddeley BOr.3 Orpheus Mk.805 turbojet engine, 4,000 lbf (18 kN) thrust

Performance

- Stall speed: 28 kn (32 mph, 52 km/h)

== See also ==
Related development

- Ball-Bartoe Jetwing

Aircraft of comparable role, configuration, and era

- English Electric P.10

Related lists

- List of experimental aircraft
