= Bristol Siddeley Orpheus =

1957 turbojet aircraft engine family by Bristol Siddeley

Orpheus
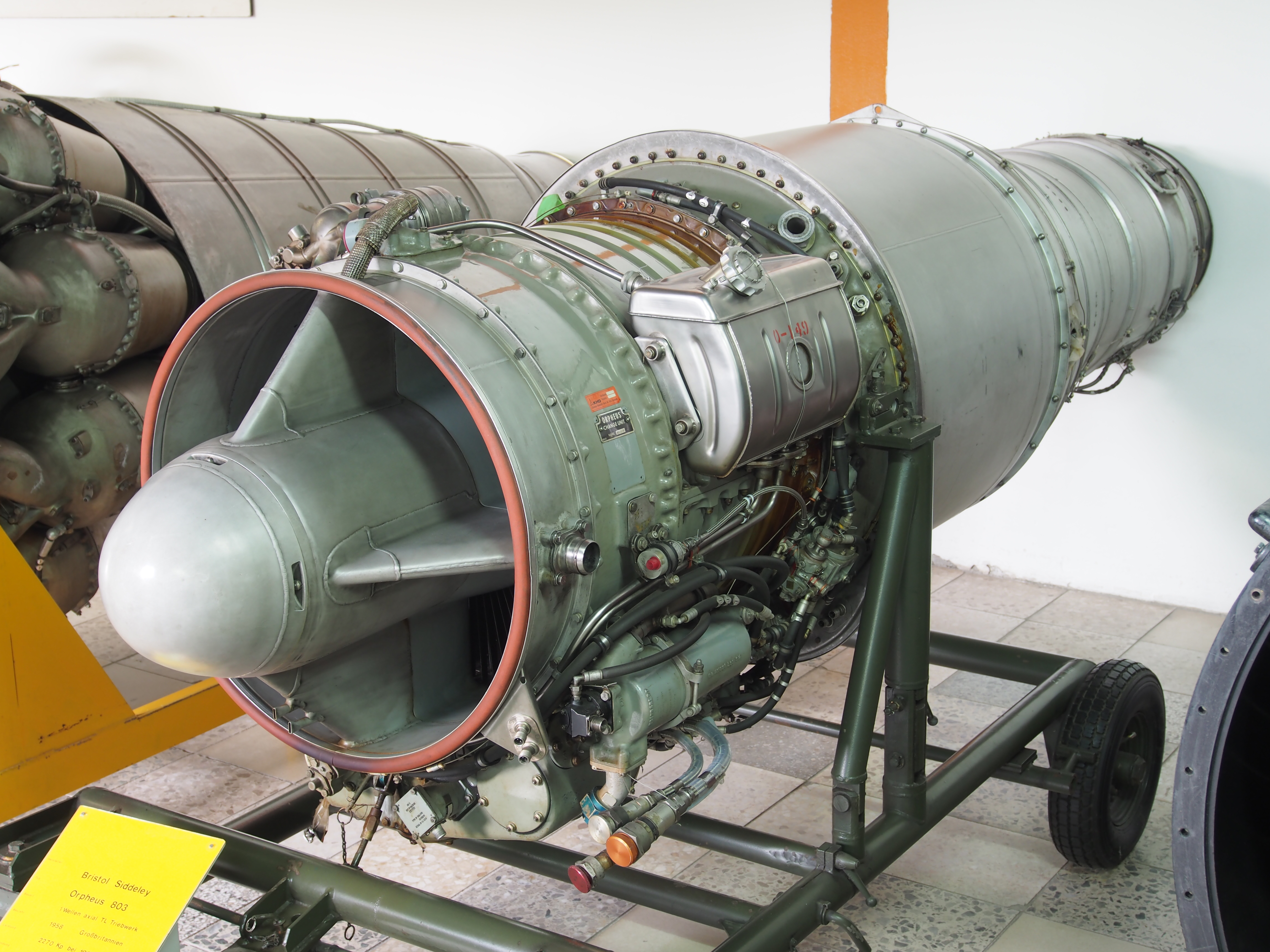
- Orpheus on display at the Flugausstellung Hermeskeil
- Type: Turbojet
- National origin: United Kingdom
- Manufacturer: Bristol Siddeley
- First run: 1957
- Major applications: Fiat G.91; Folland Gnat; Fuji T-1; HAL HF-24 Marut
- Developed into: Rolls-Royce Pegasus

The Bristol Siddeley Orpheus is a single-spool turbojet developed by Bristol Siddeley for various light fighter/trainer applications such as the Folland Gnat and the Fiat G.91. Later, the Orpheus formed the core of the first Bristol Pegasus vectored thrust turbofan used in the Harrier family.

== Design and development ==
The engine had its genesis in a 1952 request by Teddy Petter of Folland for an engine in the 5,000 pounds (22 kN) class to power a new trainer and lightweight fighter-bomber they were developing. Stanley Hooker, relatively new to the company after an earlier career at Rolls-Royce, took the project under his wing. He delivered a relatively simple and easy to maintain engine, which was put into use in the Folland Gnat, flying in 1955.

The Orpheus incorporated the novel feature of a large-diameter shaft for its single spool which then needed only two bearings. The weight savings from deleting a bearing and associated parts listed below gave an engine with a thrust of 5,000 lbf but weighing only 800 lb. (Note: This was a design thrust/weight ratio of 6.25:1, whilst earlier engines such as the Derwent and Avon gave 3:1 and the contemporary and lightweight Armstrong Siddeley Viper could only offer 4.9.) Eliminating the usual centre support bearing for the shaft joining the compressor and turbine meant the shaft would whirl, assuming a bowed shape, and damage the engine. Whirling was prevented by using a large diameter tube in place of the usual small diameter shaft. The large-diameter thin-walled tube, more than 8 inches in diameter was stiff enough to raise the whirling speed beyond the engine running range using only two bearings instead of the usual three. Two bearings gave a further advantage: previous engines had also needed a coupling in the shaft to allow for any misalignment between the static parts of the three bearings. With two bearings, the shaft simply followed the straight line between them. So the introduction of the large diameter tube allowed the removal of a bearing, a coupling, the engine's support structure for that bearing together with its lubrication system and cooling air supply.

A cannular combustor was used with seven flame tubes. This was a recent development in jet engines and the Orpheus also included the innovation of incorporating the turbine entry duct and its stator vanes into the flame tube outlet, each flame tube providing one seventh of the overall duct. This had two advantages, it simplified the manufacture of a complicated and unreliable component, also the segmented design allowed easier allowance for thermal expansion.

Developing a Sea Level Static thrust of 4,520 lbf (20.1 kN), the Orpheus 701 had a 7-stage axial compressor driven by a single stage turbine.

In 1957 NATO ran a competition for a light fighter design. All three finalists chose the Bristol Orpheus and as a result a substantial contribution towards the cost of the initial engine development was made available from the Mutual Weapons Development Program. The winner of the competition, the Fiat G.91R and G.91T, used Fiat-built versions of the engine. Other users, mostly trainers, soon followed, including the Fuji T-1, HAL HF-24 Marut, HA-300, and the experimental Hunting H.126 and Short SB5.

For later civilian applications, the Orpheus was chosen, after use of two each on the prototypes, as an option on the Lockheed JetStar, Lockheed's Vice President and head of the famous Skunk Works, Clarence "Kelly" Johnson stating; "These Orpheus engines ... have been the best engines the writer has ever used in a prototype aircraft. They were and are so good that it was decided at an early date to make all Jetstars from serial number two up capable of using two Orpheus engines (as an alternative to four American units). The Orpheus version ... is fully competitive in performance (except with one engine out) and will be offered to those who want its lower cost, simplicity, and - at least for some time - reliability".

Many companies in the 1950s were looking at ways of producing a vertical take off and landing aircraft. Michel Wibault had the idea of using a turboshaft engine to drive four large centrifugal blowers which could be swivelled to vector the thrust. Hooker's engineers decided on using the Orpheus gas generator to drive a single large fan that would supply air to a pair of rotating nozzles, while the exhaust flow from the Orpheus was split into two and would supply another pair of nozzles at the rear of the engine. This experimental system developed into the Pegasus.

Licences to produce the Orpheus were obtained by Fiat S.p.A., SNECMA and - as the TJ37 - Curtiss-Wright.

== Variants ==
Data from Jane's All the World's Aircraft 1962-63., Aircraft engines of the World 1957

BOr.1
First run on 17 December 1954, rated at 3,285 lbf (14.61 kN) by Spring 1955, with 4,050 lbf (18.0 kN) for take-off later;powered the prototype Folland Gnat.
BOr.2
4,520 lbf (20.1 kN) for take-off
BOr.3
4,850 lbf (21.6 kN) for take-off
BOr.4
4,230 lbf (18.8 kN) for take-off (de-rated)
BOr.6
BOr.11
Upflowed compressor enabled the BOr.11 to develop 5,760 lbf (25.62 kN)
BOr.12
With a simplified reheat system the BOr.12 was rated at 6,810 lbf (30.29 kN) dry and 8,170 lbf (36.34 kN) with afterburning.
Mk.100
Derated to 4,230 lbf (18.82 kN)
Mk.101
Mk.701
Rated at 4,520 lbf (20.11 kN), the Mk.701 was used in the production Folland Gnat F Mk.1 for Finland and India.
Mk.703
Rated at 4,850 lbf (21.57 kN) ; powered the Hindustan HF-24 Marut Mk.1.
Mk.703R
Reheated Mk.703 rated at 5,720 lbf (25.44 kN) powered the production version of the Hindustan HF-24 Marut. Reheat system developed by Hindustan Aeronautics Limited
Mk.801
Rated at 4,520 lbf (20.11 kN), powering G.91s. The Mk.801 was identical to the BOr.2 engine except for accessories.
Mk.803
With improvements to the compressor, rated at 5,000 lbf (22.24 kN), replaced earlier marks used in G.91s.
Mk.805
de-rated to 4,000 lbf (17.79 kN), powered Fuji T1F1 prototype and T-1A production aircraft, as well as the Hunting H.126 jet-flap research aircraft.
FIAT 4023
Mk.803 engines Licence built by FIAT.
FIAT 4023
Mk.803 engines Licence built by FIAT with added fire detection system.

== Applications ==
Aircraft

- Armstrong Whitworth AW.171
- Breguet Taon
- Fiat G.91
- Folland Gnat
- Fuji T-1
- HAL HF-24 Marut
- HAL HJT-16 Kiran
- Hawker P.1126
- Helwan HA-300
- Hunting H.126
- Short SB5

Other applications

Orpheus engines, numbers 709 (destroyed by FOD in testing) and 711 (running) powered the Bluebird K7 hydroplane in which Donald Campbell was killed whilst attempting the water speed record on Lake Coniston in 1967.

A dragster powered by an Orpheus, the "Vampire", is the current holder of the British land speed record.

== Engines on display ==
Preserved Bristol Siddeley Orpheus engines are on display at Aerospace Bristol, at the Midland Air Museum, Coventry, and at Solent Sky, Southampton. One is also preserved as a relic in India's first aerospace museum in Hindustan Aerospace Heritage Centre, Bangalore.

== Specifications (Orpheus BOr.3 / Mk.803) ==
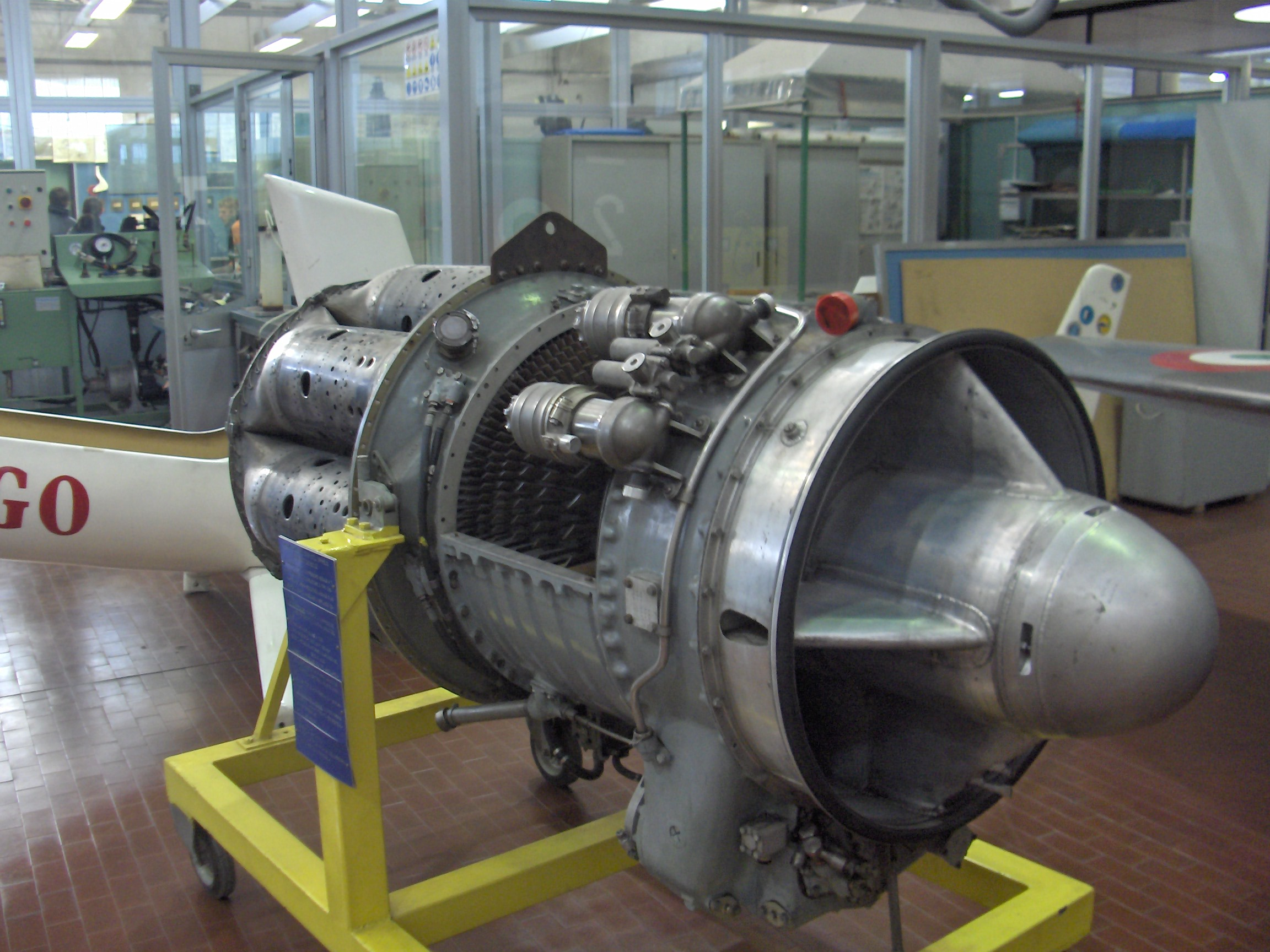
Bristol Orpheus as fitted to the Fiat G.91

Data from Jane's All the World's Aircraft 1962-63.

==== General characteristics ====
- Type: Turbojet:single spool
- Length: 75.45 in (1,916 mm)intake flange to exhaust cone
- Diameter: 32.4 in (823 mm)
- Dry weight: 835 lb (379 kg)

==== Components ====
- Compressor: 7 stage Axial
- Combustors: Can-annular with 7 flame tubes
- Turbine: Single stage turbine
- Fuel type: Aviation kerosene
- Oil system: Pressure spray and metered feed to gearbox and rear bearing. Oil from the rear bearing is lost overboard to the jet efflux.

==== Performance ====
- Maximum thrust: 5,000 lbf (22 kN)
- Overall pressure ratio: 4.4:1
- Air mass flow: 84 lb/s (38.10 kg/s)
- Turbine inlet temperature: 1,184 °F (640 °C) maximum continuous
- Specific fuel consumption: 1.08 lb/(lbf h) (110.1 kg/(kN h))
- Thrust-to-weight ratio: 5.988

== See also ==
Related development

- Rolls-Royce Pegasus

Comparable engines

- Armstrong Siddeley Sapphire
- Ishikawajima-Harima J3
- Rolls-Royce Avon

Related lists

- List of aircraft engines
