= Mutual Weapons Development Program =

NATO program for weapons development cooperation

The Mutual Weapons Development Program was a NATO initiative established in Paris in 1954 as part of the alliance's efforts to enhance defense cooperation among member states. The program aimed to facilitate the exchange of weapons development data, coordinate military equipment production and delivery, and develop defense technology capabilities among NATO allies.

The establishment of the Mutual Weapons Development Program in 1954 coincided with significant developments in NATO's nuclear policy. That same year, the first U.S. nuclear weapons arrived in Europe, marking a crucial step in NATO's nuclear sharing arrangements.

== Structure and organization ==
Under the MWDP, the US and another country would be 50/50 partners in the financing and direction of research and development of a new weapon.

The Mutual Weapons Development Program was led by ateam consisting of a director, a deputy director, and three service members (one from each military branch of the US armed forces)

This structure ensured representation from various military sectors and facilitated comprehensive collaboration in weapons development.

During the course of any individual program under the MWDP, the US had a fund available for technical assistance which lay outside the joint project finances.

Any result of the program was offered to the NATO Armaments Committee for consideration as ready for production and available for any friendly country under “equitable terms and conditions".

== Objectives ==
The primary objectives of the Mutual Weapons Development Program included:

- Enhancing collective defense capabilities
- Promoting shared research and development initiatives
- Streamlining the production and distribution of military equipment
- Fostering technological advancements in defense among NATO members

== Legacy and impact ==
The Mutual Weapons Development Program played a role in shaping NATO's collective defense strategy during the Cold War era. It contributed to the standardization of military equipment and promoted technological cooperation among alliance members.

== See also ==
- North Atlantic Treaty Organization
- Cold War
- Nuclear sharing
