= Derek Whitehead (pilot) =

Royal Navy test pilot officer (1925–1989)

Lieutenant Commander Derek John Whitehead AFC OBE
- Born: 5 May 1925; Edmonton, London, England
- Died: 4 June 1989 (aged 64); Buckinghamshire, England
- Education: Colfe's School
- Alma mater: Sidney Sussex College, Cambridge
- Known for: First deck landing with the Buccaneer XK523 in 1960
- Spouse: Elizabeth Callender (m. 1948)
- Children: 2
- Parents: William Arthur Whitehead (father); Florence Wood (mother)
- Military career
- Allegiance: United Kingdom
- Branch: Royal Air Force; Royal Navy
- Service years: 1943-1975
- Rank: Lieutenant Commander
- Unit: 801 Naval Air Squadron
- Awards: AFC; OBE; Queen's Commendation for Valuable Service in the Air

Lieutenant Commander Derek John Whitehead AFC OBE (5 May 1925 - 4 June 1989) was an English test pilot, and former Fleet Air Arm aviator, being the first to fly the Buccaneer in April 1958, and to make the aircraft's first deck landing.

== Early life ==
He was born in Edmonton, London.

He was the son of William Arthur Whitehead (23 September 1897 - 1978) and Florence Wood (14 March 1897 - 1976). His mother came from Princes Risborough and his parents married in High Wycombe in 1921. The Whitehead family originated from Warwickshire, namely Cubbington.

He attended Colfe's School, being evacuated to Kent in 1939. He later attended Sidney Sussex College, Cambridge.

== Career ==
=== Fleet Air Arm ===
He joined the RAF in 1943, and became a pilot in May 1945. Three months later he joined the Fleet Air Arm, flying with 801 Naval Air Squadron.

=== Hawker Siddeley ===
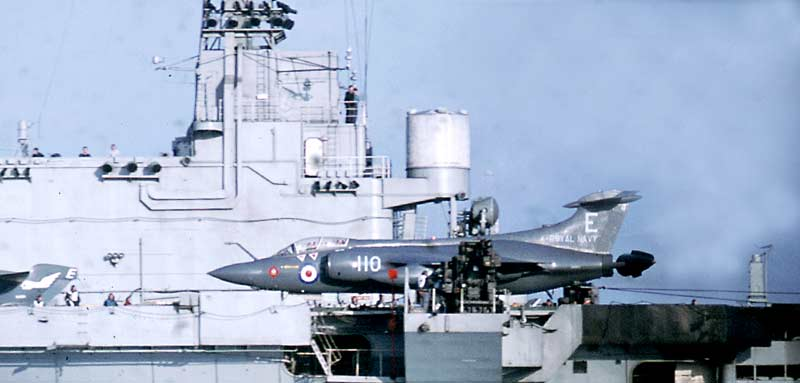
Buccaneer in January 1970

He became a test pilot. He was the first pilot to fly the Buccaneer XK486, when aged 33, on 30 April 1958, at RAE Bedford.

He made the first deck landing with the Buccaneer XK523 on 19 January 1960, on HMS Victorious (R38). He was the first to fly the Mk2 Buccaneer on Friday 17 May 1963. The Buccaneer would replace the Westland Wyvern. The other test pilot was Sailor Parker. The Buccaneer was commissioned in Scotland in March 1961, with 801 Naval Squadron, at a service which he attended.

He took over as chief test pilot in May 1959, from 57-year-old Harold Wood. He tested Royal Navy Phantoms in the late 1960s.

He left the position of test pilot at the end of May 1975, being replaced by Don Headley from Leicestershire, who had joined HSA as test pilot in 1968.

== Personal life ==
He married Elizabeth Callender in 1948 in Harlington, London. They had two daughters Heather (born 1956) and Anne (born 1950), with six grandchildren.

He was awarded the AFC in the 1958 Birthday Honours, and was awarded RAeS R.P. Alston Memorial Prize in December 1969. He received the Queen's Commendation for Valuable Service in the Air, and was awarded the OBE in the 1970 Birthday Honours.

When a test pilot, he lived in Cherry Burton. He moved to Buckinghamshire in 1975, where he died in June 1989, of a heart attack.

== See also ==
- Edward Tennant (pilot), first to fly the Folland Gnat
