= Duncan Simpson =

Scottish pilot

Duncan Menzies Soutar Simpson OBE FRAeS FIMechE (23 December 1927 - 5 December 2017) was a Scottish test pilot who played a key role in the development of the Hunter aircraft, the Harrier, and the Hawk advanced trainer flown by the RAF’s Red Arrows. He was the former chief test pilot of Hawker Siddeley in the 1970s. He flew the first production Harrier aircraft in December 1967, and the first two-seat Harrier in April 1969.

== Early life ==
He was born in Edinburgh, and was educated at Merchiston Castle School there. His uncle was a test pilot for the Fairey Aviation Company.

== Career ==
=== de Havilland ===
After leaving school in 1945 he worked for de Havilland in Hertfordshire.

=== Royal Air Force ===
In 1949 he joined the Royal Air Force with 6FTS and 226 OCU, and flew the Gloster Meteor VIII with 222 Squadron. In 1953 he joined the Day Fighter Development Unit at the Central Fighter Establishment.

=== Hawker Siddeley Aviation ===
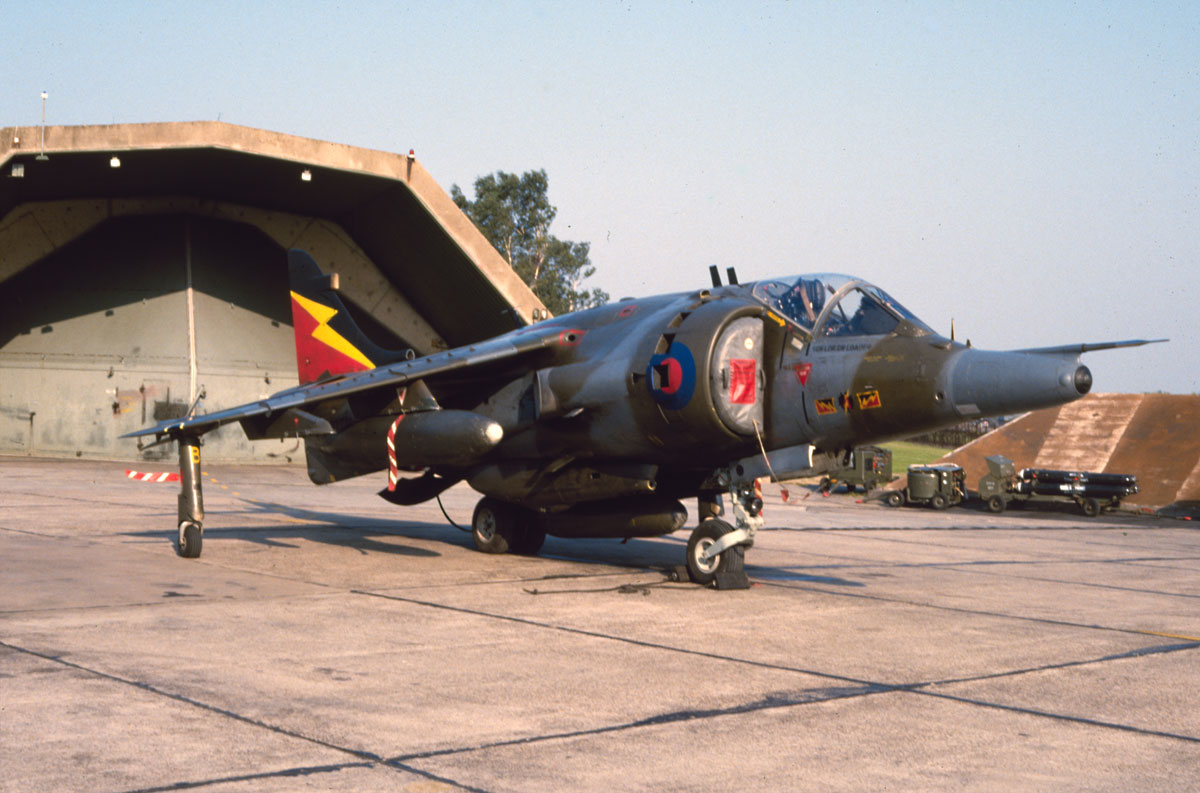
XV738 the first production Harrier GR1, soon after made into a GR3, seen in August 1987 at RAF Gütersloh with 4 Squadron, piloted by Squadron Leader Clive Loader, who became an Air Chief Marshal

He joined Hawker Siddeley in 1954. He first flew the Hawker Siddeley P.1127 in August 1962; he was the third pilot to fly the P.1127. On 27 December 1967, he was the first the fly the first production Harrier GR1 XV738. On 24 April 1969 he was the first to fly the two-seat Harrier XW174; six weeks later on 4 June 1969 in this aircraft, he was forced to eject at low level (100 ft), over Larkhill in Wiltshire, when the engine failed at 3,000 ft. On ejection from the aircraft he broke his neck; he needed a bone graft, and surgeons had to operate via his throat. He returned to flying nine months later, and received the Queen's Commendation for Valuable Service in the Air in the 1969 Birthday Honours. After this incident, all Hawker aircraft were fitted with canopy severance cord (Note: See definition by ChemRing Energetics) to shatter the canopy before ejection occurred.

He became deputy chief test pilot in 1969. He became chief test pilot in 1970. He was the first to fly the Hawk HS1182 prototype (XX154) at around 7pm on 21 August 1974, and reached 20,000 ft in a 53-minute flight. The Hawk entered service with the RAF in November 1976.

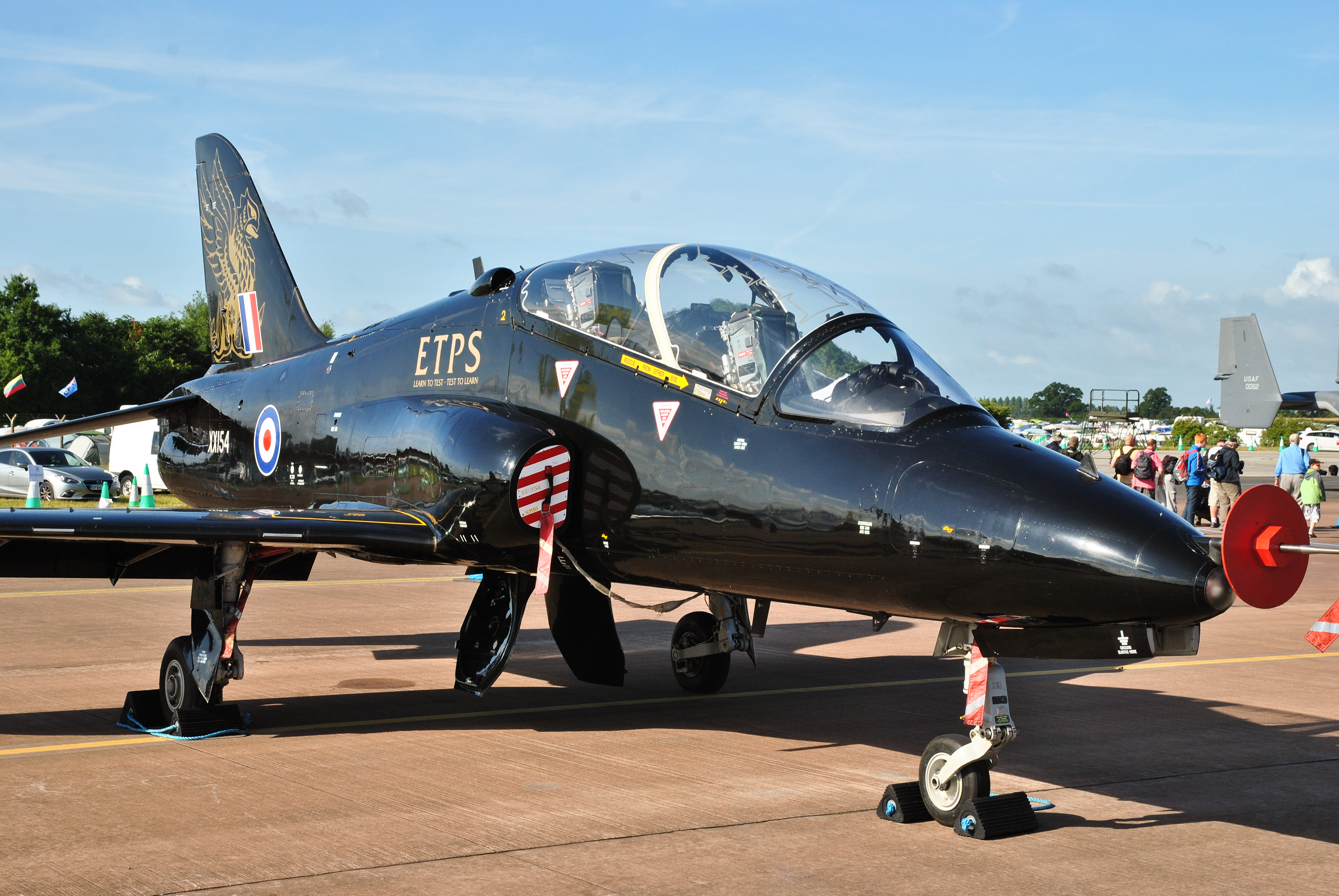
Hawk XX154 - the first example to fly, in August 1974 at Dunsfold Aerodrome. Seen here at RIAT in July 2015

== Personal life ==
He married in June 1958 and had two sons, and a daughter. They lived in Guildford, Surrey.

He received an award in 2011 from the Honourable Company of Air Pilots. He received the OBE in the 1973 Birthday Honours. He became a Fellow of the Society of Experimental Test Pilots. He died aged 89 in December 2017.

== See also ==
- Ralph Hooper, designer of the Harrier and the Hawk
- List of Harrier family losses
- Edward Tennant, first to fly the Folland Gnat on 18 July 1955 from RAF Boscombe Down to RAF Chilbolton in Hampshire

Business positions
Preceded by	Chief Test Pilot of Hawker Siddeley Aviation; 1970-1978	Succeeded by
