= Edward Tennant (pilot) =

RAF pilot (1922–1981)

Edward Alan Tennant
- Born: 25 February 1922
- Died: September 1981 (aged 58–59); Norfolk,
- Military career
- Allegiance: United Kingdom
- Branch: Royal Air Force
- Service years: 1940-1953
- Rank: Squadron Leader
- Nickname: Teddy
- Service number: 139577
- Conflicts: Second World War
- Awards: Distinguished Flying Cross
- Other work: Test pilot

Squadron Leader Edward Alan Tennant DFC (25 February 1922 – September 1981) was a Royal Air Force (RAF) fighter pilot who later became chief test pilot of Folland Aircraft.

== Career ==
=== Royal Air Force ===
Tennant joined the RAFVR in 1940, qualifying as a Sergeant pilot in 1941. He served with 256 Squadron and 153 Squadron, first flying Defiants, then Hurricanes. He was promoted to Flight Sergeant in December 1942 and to Flying Officer in June 1943. Later in the war he was posted to 257 Squadron and 263 Squadron flying Typhoons. While he was with 263 Squadron he was promoted to Flight Lieutenant (war substantive) in December 1944 and awarded the DFC (in September 1945). By the end of the war he had flown 250 operational sorties, with 450 hours on ground-attack operations.

After the war he remained in the RAF. He was posted to No. 84 Group Communications Squadron in Germany, and was at the Air Ministry from 1946 to 1948. He was promoted to Flying Officer (extended service) in December 1946 and Flight Lieutenant (permanent) in August 1948 In 1949 he graduated from the No 8 course at the Empire Test Pilots' School (ETPS) and was posted to A&AEE Boscombe Down, B squadron He retired from the RAF in June 1953 (retaining the rank of Squadron Leader) and joined Folland Aircraft as Chief Test Pilot.

=== Folland Aircraft ===
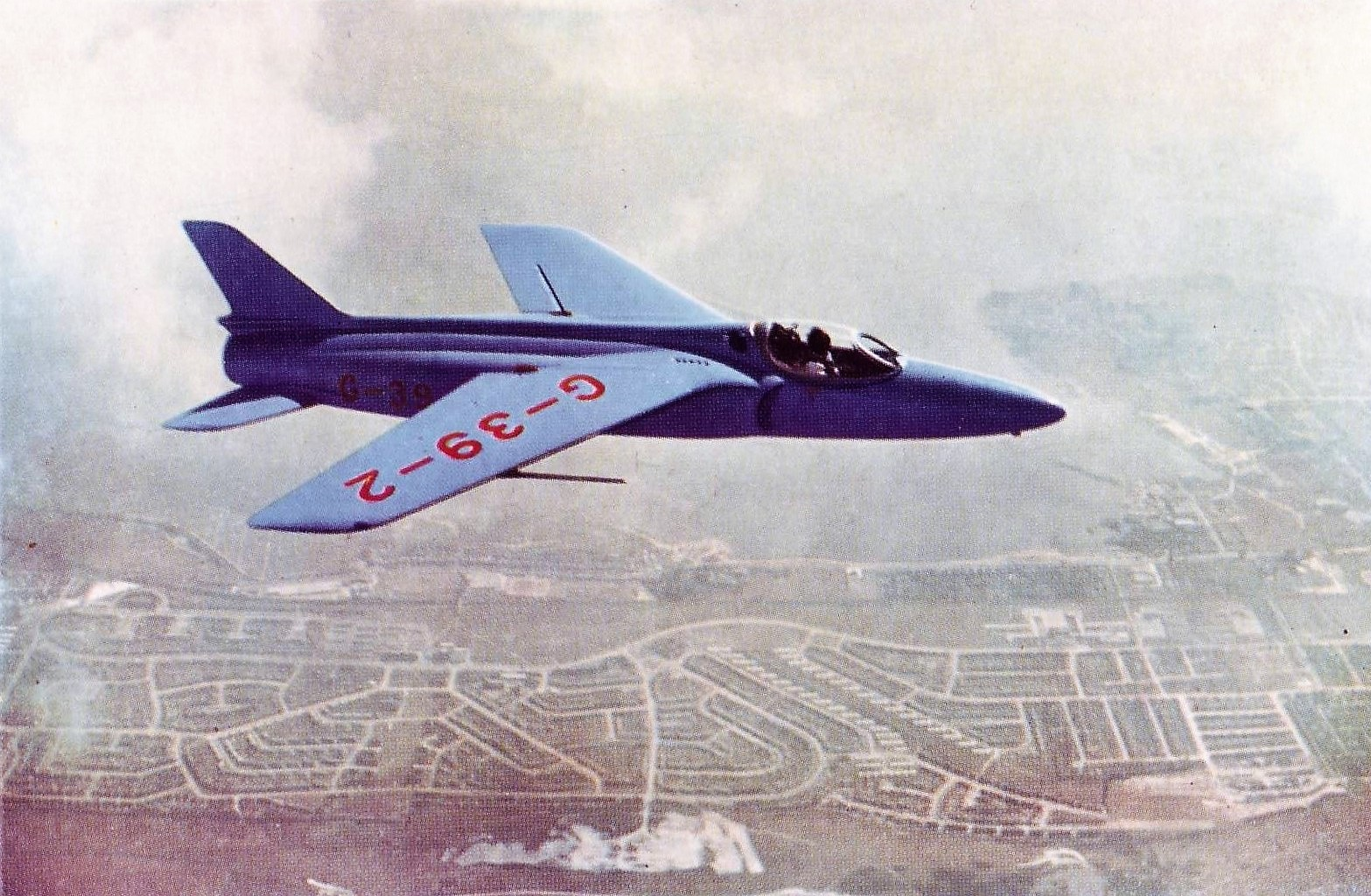
Folland Gnat (single seat) prototype being flown by Tennant in August 1955, as pictured on the Folland Aircraft 1955 Christmas card, showing the company's G-39 Class B markings

When Edward Tennant and his wife Sylvia relocated to Hampshire they rented a farm close to Folland's Chilbolton airfield so he could stable his horse and ride it to work. After flying, he would unwind by scything the airfield grass to provide hay for his animals, and spend some of his evenings helping to run a pub in Stockbridge with Vickers-Supermarine's test pilots.

Tennant made the maiden flight of Folland's prototype light fighter, the Fo 139 Midge, on 11 August 1954 and displayed it at the Farnborough air show in September. Despite the low power from its Viper engine, Tennant demonstrated it was capable of supersonic flight in a shallow dive from 34,000 ft, in late 1954.

On 18 July 1955 Tennant made the first flight of the Folland Gnat G-39-2 from at Aeroplane and Armament Experimental Establishment (A & AEE) at RAF Boscombe Down (eastward) to RAF Chilbolton, in a flight lasting fifteen minutes. Four days later on 22 July 1955, Tennant was flying G-39-2 at 20,000 ft, when the Gnat's canopy detached. His helmet, oxygen mask and microphone were torn away, leaving him cut on the head and without any means of communicating with the airfield. On approach, the runway was obstructed so he elected to make a wheels-up landing on the grass. Neither himself nor the Gnat were badly damaged. The Gnat was repaired just in time for Tennant to fly a display at the 1955 the Farnborough air show, during which he performed high-speed loops, fast passes and high-G tight turns.

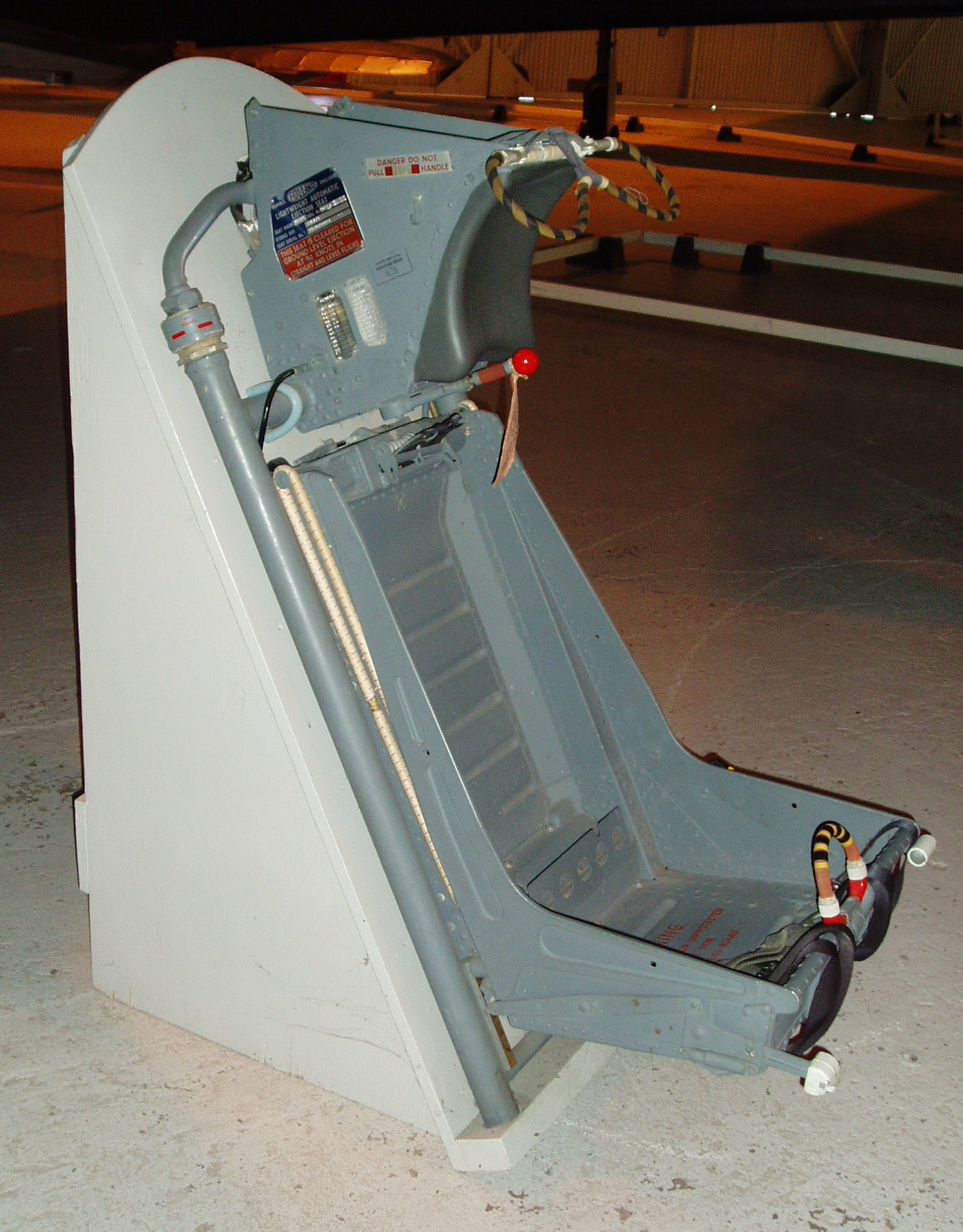
Folland lightweight ejection seat of the type Tennant would have used. Note the face-blind ejection handle in addition to the seat pan handle

On 31 July 1956, Tennant was assessing the Gnat's aero-elastic flutter speeds at an altitude of 1000 ft, above the Chilbolton airfield. During the test, he made sudden pitch demands and determined if the resulting oscillations decayed. At Mach 0.91 a torsional flutter in G-39-2's tailplane caused it to detach from the airframe. Tennant tried remedial measures with throttle and tail-trim, but once he realised there was no response to control inputs he had no other option but to eject. By this time he was down to 600 ft and his airspeed was above that of the earlier Folland ejection seat tests; he pulled the face blind and made a successful ejection, only suffering a sprained arm. He parachuted to within walking distance of his farm, walked home and poured himself a drink. Shortly after this, his wife returned home and asked, "What are you doing here? I thought you were supposed to be working today".

At that year's Farnborough air show, Tennnant and his assistant, Dick Wittington flew XK724, the first of the six Ministry of Supply procured Gnats

He demonstrated the second Gnat prototype at the twenty-second Paris Air Show in early June 1957, flying from Chilbolton to Le Bourget.

In 1959 he flew the first two-seat (twin-stick) version XM691 of the Folland Gnat from RAF Chilbolton (directly westward) to RAF Boscombe Down. The trainer version F.O.144 of the aircraft had a 30% larger wing than the fighter version. By this time, the 12 Gnat aircraft were in service with the Finnish Air Force. The Gnat (XP501) entered service with the Central Flying School at RAF Little Rissington on 5 November 1962, then another Gnat entered service with 4 FTS on 7 November 1962. The Gnat left RAF training service in late 1978. It was chosen for the RAF's new Yellow Jackets aerobatic display team. In autumn 1959 Folland Aircraft became part of Hawker Siddeley Aviation (HSA); flight testing moved to HSA in spring 1961.

== Personal life ==
He was awarded the Distinguished Flying Cross on 14 September 1945 when a Flight Lieutenant with 263 Squadron. He died in Norfolk in September 1981 aged 59.

== See also ==
- Duncan Simpson (1927–2017), former Chief Test Pilot of Hawker Siddeley Aviation, who first flew the Hawk on 21 August 1974 from Dunsfold Aerodrome
