= Edward Tennant =

Edward Tennant may refer to:

- Edward Tennant, 1st Baron Glenconner (1859–1920), Scottish Liberal politician
- Edward Tennant (poet) (1897–1916), English war poet, son of the 1st Baron Glenconner
- Edward Tennant (pilot) (1922–1981), who first flew the Folland Gnat
