= Folland Fo.108 =

Testbed aircraft

Fo.108

General information
- Type: Engine testbed
- Manufacturer: Folland Aircraft
- Number built: 12

History
- Introduction date: 1940
- First flight: 1940

The Folland Fo.108, also known as the Folland 43/37 and by the nickname Folland Frightful (or Frightener), was a large monoplane engine testbed aircraft of the 1940s.

== Design and development ==
The Fo.108 was Folland's response to Air Ministry Specification 43/37 for a single-engined engine testbed, with accommodation for a pilot and two observers. In 1938, the Air Ministry selected the F.108 ahead of designs from Percival Aircraft (the P.26/P.26A) and General Aircraft (the GAL.43), with an order for twelve F.108s being placed. It was Folland's first design to be accepted by the Air Ministry for production. The Fo.108 was a large low-wing cantilever monoplane with a conventional cantilever tailplane and a fixed tailwheel landing gear. It had a glazed cockpit for the pilot, and a cabin for two observers behind and below the pilot, fitted out so that they could make detailed measurements of engine performance during flight.

To enable the aircraft to be delivered from the Hamble factory and later ferried to new assignments, they were normally fitted with a Bristol Hercules radial engine. In service, the Fo.108 was fitted with a number of other engines including the inline Napier Sabre (four), Bristol Centaurus radial, and Rolls-Royce Griffon V-engine.

Entering service in 1940, the type was operated by the Bristol Aeroplane Company, Napier and Rolls-Royce, Five of the twelve production aircraft were lost in crashes, the type earning the nickname "Frightener" as a result. The last examples of the Fo.108 were withdrawn from service in 1946, by de Havilland's engine division.

== Specifications (Centaurus engine) ==
Data from Jane's Fighting aircraft of World War II

General characteristics

- Crew: 1
- Capacity: 2 observers
- Length: 43 ft 4 in (13.21 m)
- Wingspan: 58 ft (18 m)
- Height: 16 ft 3 in (4.95 m)
- Wing area: 588 sq ft (54.6 m^{2})
- Gross weight: 16,000 lb (7,257 kg)
- Powerplant: 1 × Bristol Centaurus I 18-cylinder air-cooled radial piston engine, 2,340 hp (1,740 kW)
- Propellers: 4-bladed constant-speed propeller

Performance

- Maximum speed: 292 mph (470 km/h, 254 kn) at 15,000 ft (4,600 m)
- Cruise speed: 267 mph (430 km/h, 232 kn) at 13,000 ft (4,000 m)

== See also ==
Related lists

- List of aircraft of the Royal Air Force
- List of experimental aircraft
