= Yellowjacks =

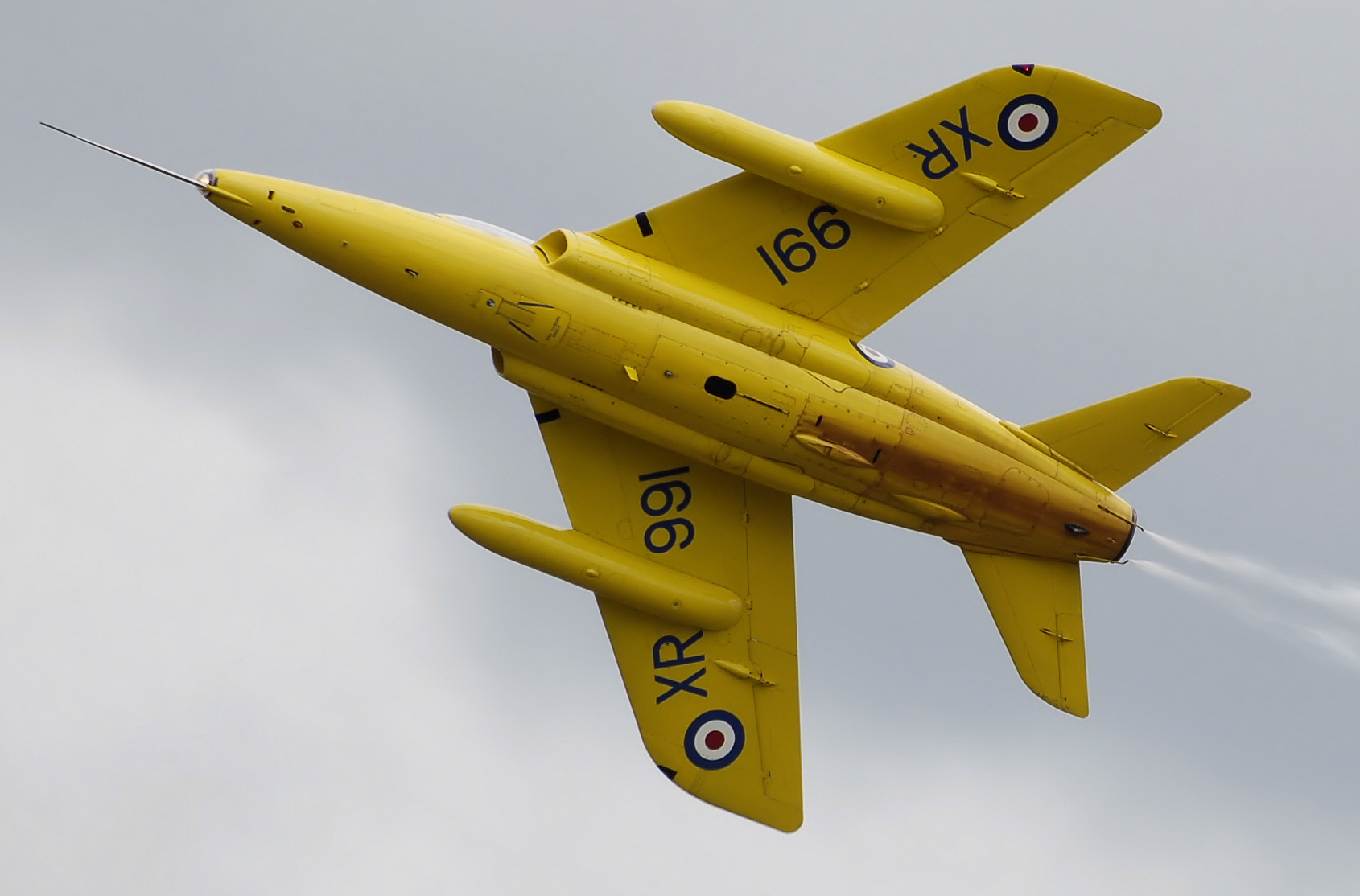
- This aircraft is painted in the colours of the Yellowjacks but never flew for the team
- Active: 1963–1965
- Country: United Kingdom
- Branch: Royal Air Force
- Role: Aerobatic flight display team
- Base: RAF Valley
- Colours: Yellow

Aircraft flown
- Trainer: Folland Gnat

The Yellowjacks were a Royal Air Force aerobatic display team which flew Folland Gnat trainers painted yellow. The team was formed in May 1964 by a group of flying instructors, led by Flight Lieutenant Lee Jones, at No 4 Flying Training School at RAF Valley. The two-seat Gnat T.1 had been in service at Valley only since November 1962, when the first 20 student pilots, selected after being awarded their "wings", from the recently graduated No 82 Entry of the RAF College Cranwell, had started their advanced training on the Gnat. Instructors and student pilots loved this aircraft, because of its small size and its sensitive handling and high maneuverability.

The name adopted by the team (derived from the team leader's call-sign) was disapproved of by higher authority, who recognised the concept of a Gnat aerobatic team as attractive, but felt the name and the yellow colour of the aircraft wrong. (The name Daffodil Patrol was once believed to have been suggested). It was also thought that the team had maverick instincts, and needed to be brought into the mainstream so the team was officially reformed, in November 1964, as The Red Arrows. The Red Arrows continued flying the Gnat until 1979 when it was superseded by the British Aerospace Hawk for the 1980 season.

The first 25 years of the RAF aerobatic team are covered in the documentary "A Quiver of Silver" with Lee Jones.

== See also ==
- Black Arrows – a Hawker Hunter squadron, tasked for a year as the RAF aerobatic team
- Yellow Jack (flag)
