= Folland Midge =

1950s British fighter aircraft prototype

Midge

General information
- Type: Fighter
- National origin: United Kingdom
- Manufacturer: Folland Aircraft
- Designer: W.E.W. Petter
- Number built: 1

History
- First flight: 11 August 1954
- Developed into: Folland Gnat

The Folland Midge was a small, swept-wing British subsonic light fighter aircraft prototype originally developed as a concept demonstrator for the successful Folland Gnat. It was designed by W.E.W. Petter as a private venture for Folland Aircraft and first flew on 11 August 1954.

== Design and development ==
The Midge and Gnat were the creation of W.E.W. "Teddy" Petter, a British aircraft designer who had gained wide recognition for his design of the English Electric Canberra bomber and Lightning supersonic interceptor. Petter had grown suspicious of the trend towards bigger and more expensive combat aircraft, and he felt that a small, simple fighter would offer the advantages of low purchase and operational costs. New lightweight turbojet engines were being developed that would be able to power such small fighters.

Petter was unable to pursue this vision at English Electric, so he left to become managing director and chief designer of Folland Aircraft. In 1951, using company funds, he began work on his lightweight fighter concept, which was designated the "Fo-141 Gnat". The Gnat was to be powered by a Bristol BE.22 Saturn turbojet with 3,800 lbf (17 kN) thrust. However, the Saturn was cancelled, and so Petter's unarmed proof-of-concept demonstrator for the Gnat was powered by the less powerful Armstrong Siddeley Viper 101 with 1,640 lbf (7.3 kN) thrust. The demonstrator was designated Fo-139 "Midge". The Midge, serial number G-39-1, first flew on 11 August 1954 from Boscombe Down, Wiltshire, with Teddy Tennant at the controls, and proved to be an excellent aircraft.

The Midge had a number of advanced features, such as hydraulically powered "flaperons", main landing gear that could be used as airbrakes, and a one-piece canopy that hinged over an inner armoured windscreen. Despite the low-powered engine, the little jet could break Mach 1 in a dive and was very agile.

The Midge was evaluated by pilots from Canada, India, Jordan, New Zealand, and the US Air Force, and was almost universally praised. The Midge had performed a total of 220 flights when it was destroyed in a fatal crash on 26 September 1955, with a Swiss pilot at the controls. However, the Midge had demonstrated that Petter's lightweight fighter concept had much going for it. Folland went on to develop a full-scale Gnat prototype, also using company funds.

Original film footage of the Midge can be seen in the 1956 British science fiction film Satellite in the Sky. The Midge portrays a fictional jet fighter used to test an experimental rocket fuel.

== Specifications ==
Data from The Encyclopedia of World Aircraft

General characteristics

- Crew: 1
- Length: 28 ft 9 in (8.76 m)
- Wingspan: 20 ft 8 in (6.30 m)
- Height: 9 ft 3 in (2.82 m)
- Wing area: 125 sq ft (11.6 m^{2})
- Airfoil: RAE 102
- Gross weight: 4,500 lb (2,041 kg)
- Powerplant: 1 × Armstrong Siddeley Viper 101 turbojet engine, 1,640 lbf (7.3 kN) thrust

Performance

- Maximum speed: 600 mph (970 km/h, 520 kn)
- Service ceiling: 40,000 ft (12,000 m)

== See also ==
Related development

- Folland Gnat
- HAL Ajeet

Aircraft of comparable role, configuration, and era

- Lockheed T-33
- Northrop F-5
- Northrop T-38 Talon
