= RAF Chilbolton =

Former RAF base in Hampshire, England

RAF Chilbolton USAAF Station AAF-404
- Near Chilbolton, Hampshire in England
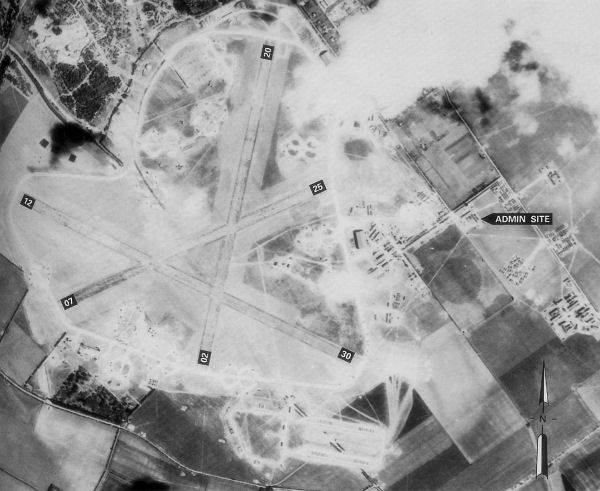
- Aerial Photo of Chilbolton Airfield - 20 April 1944

Site information
- Type: Royal Air Force station Satellite station 1942-43; Relief landing ground 1940-42
- Code: CI
- Owner: Air Ministry
- Operator: Royal Air Force; United States Army Air Forces
- Controlled by: RAF Fighter Command 1940-43; 1945-61 * No. 9 Group RAF * No. 10 Group RAF * No. 70 (T) Group RAF

Location
- Shown within Hampshire RAF Chilbolton (the United Kingdom)
- Coordinates: 51°08′36″N 001°26′23″W

Site history
- Built: 1939/40
- In use: September 1940 - 1961
- Battles/wars: European theatre of World War II

Airfield information
- Elevation: 88 metres (289 ft) AMSL
Runways
Direction	Length and surface
02/20	1,463 metres (4,800 ft) Asphalt
06/24	1,280 metres (4,199 ft) Asphalt
12/30	1,645 metres (5,397 ft) Asphalt

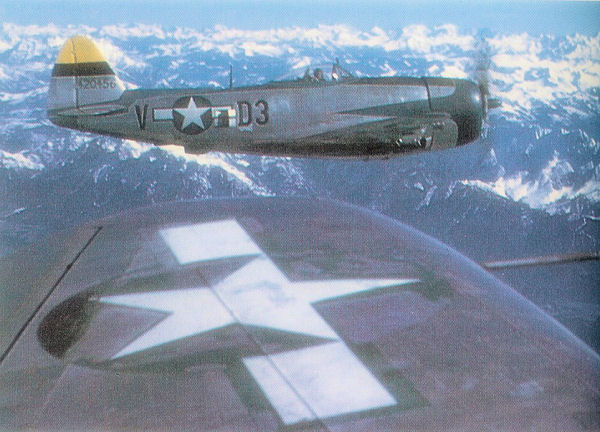
Republic P-47D-30-RE Thunderbolt Serial 44-20456 of the 397th Fighter Squadron on an escort mission over the German Alps.

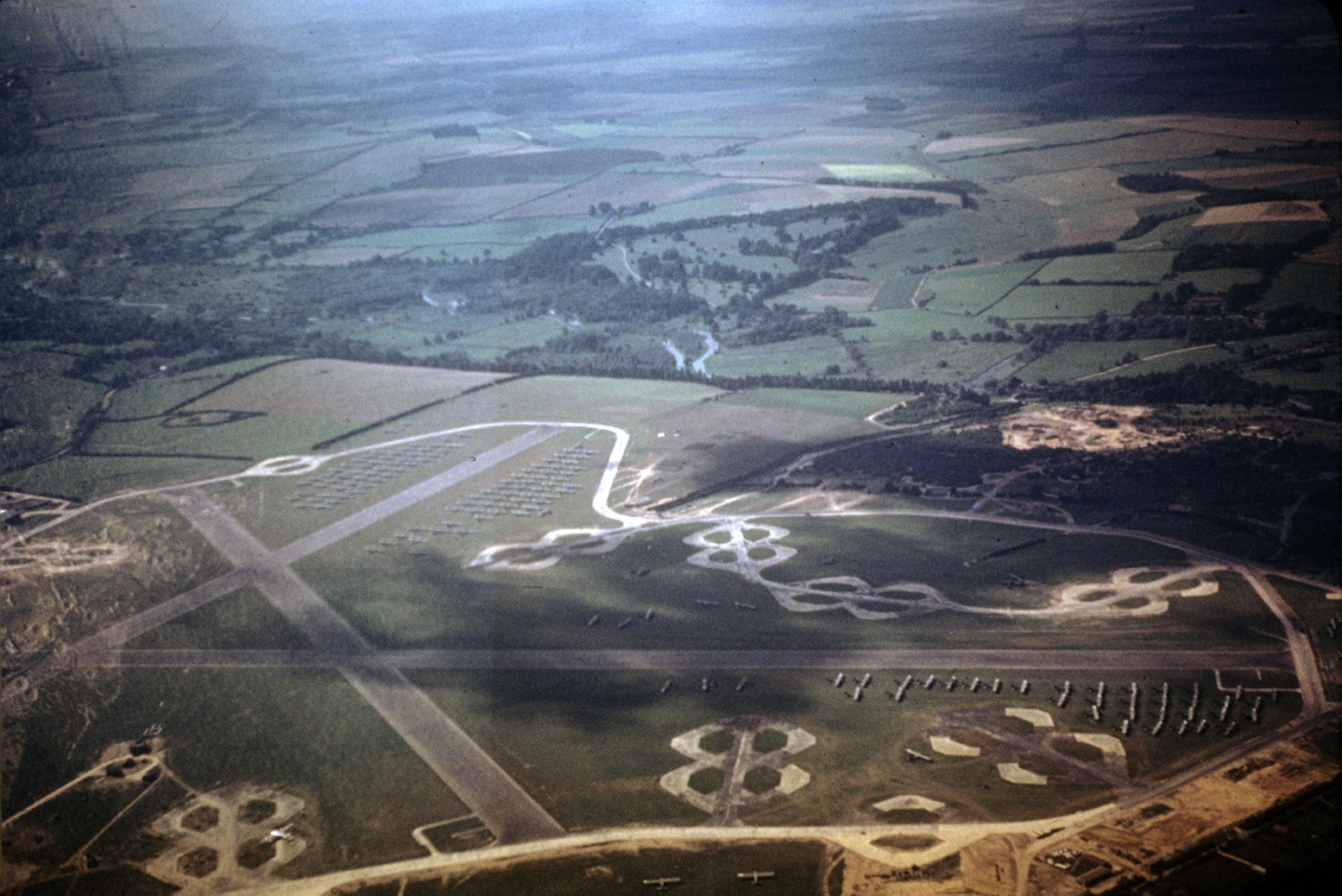
CG-4As and C-47s of 442nd Operations Group at Chilbolton for Operation Market Garden, September 1944.

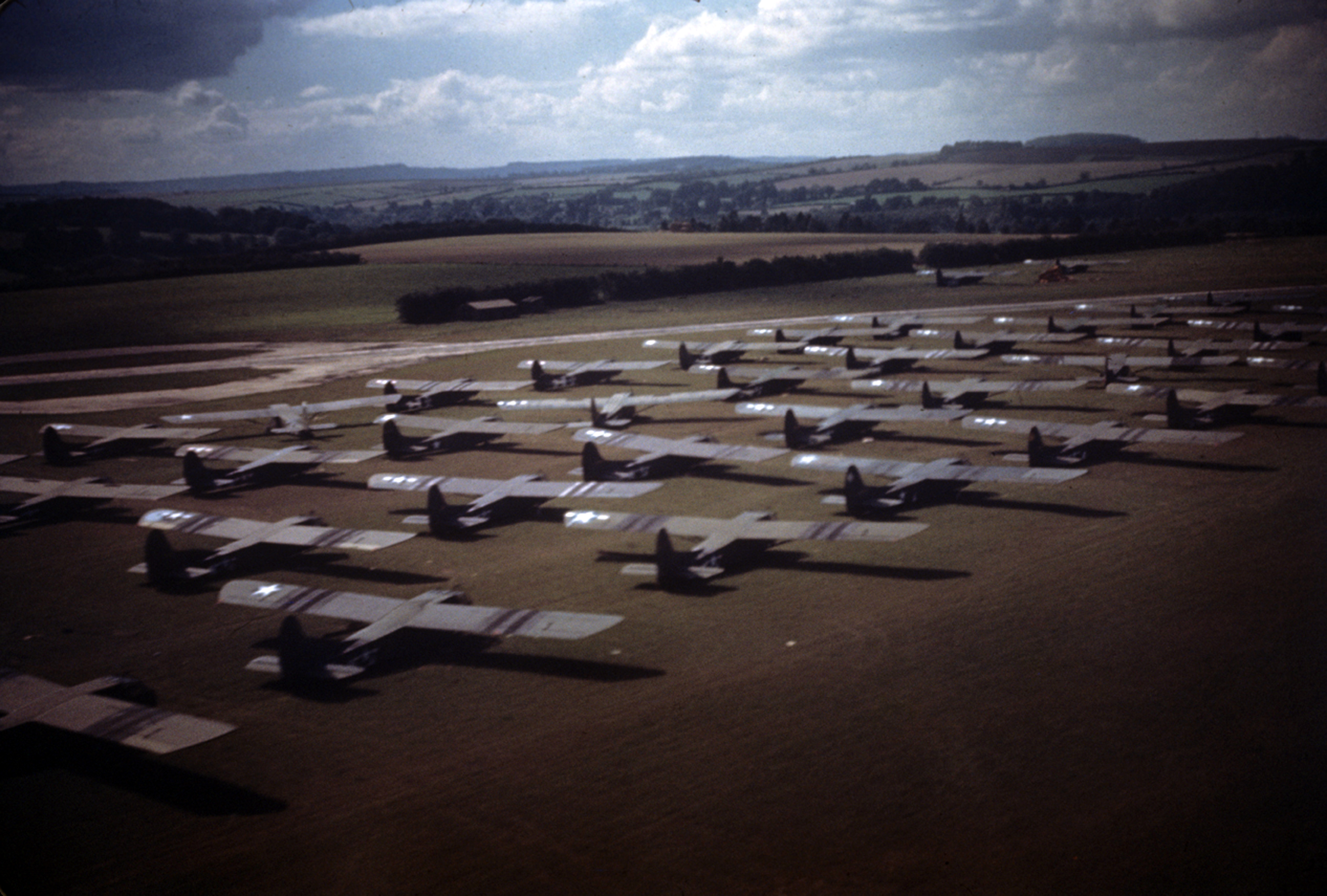
Closeup of CG-4A gliders at Chilbolton in early September 1944 ready to be used in "Operation Market Garden".

Royal Air Force Chilbolton or RAF Chilbolton is a former Royal Air Force station in Hampshire, England. The airfield was located in Chilbolton approximately 4 miles (6.4 km) south-southeast of Andover.

Opened in 1940, it was used by the Royal Air Force and later by the United States Army Air Forces. During the war it was used primarily as a troop carrier airfield for parachutists. After the war it was used for military jet aircraft training before closing as an RAF station in 1946, although it was then used until the early 1960s by the Vickers-Supermarine and Folland aircraft companies for flight testing and development flying.

Today the remains of the airfield are located on private property, being used as agricultural fields.

== History ==
=== Royal Air Force use ===
RAF Chilbolton was opened in September 1940 as a satellite of RAF Middle Wallop and was used as a relief landing ground. At first it was developed piecemeal with the addition of the necessary facilities that took it towards existence as an independent airfield. It then hosted its own Hawker Hurricane squadrons which took part in the Battle of Britain. No. 238 Squadron RAF operated throughout the Battle of Britain from Middle Wallop and RAF St Eval as part of No. 10 Group Fighter Command, posted to Chilbolton in September 1940 with Hurricane Is.

During the Battle of Britain many sorties were flown covering Southampton to Bristol. Once the battle had been won and the threat of invasion had passed, major Luftwaffe raids ceased. Several Spitfire and Hurricane squadrons came and went, none stayed very long.

By late 1941 Chilbolton had been upgraded with the addition of a perimeter track and several concrete dispersal pens around it.

By November 1941 it was placed into "care and maintenance" as there was no use for it by then, as the Battle of Britain had ended and there were sufficient airfields in the area to continue the war without it.

RAF Units stationed at Chilbolton:

- 238 Sqn, Hurricane I, arrived 30 September 1940, departed 20 May 1941.
- Glider Pilots Exercise Unit, de Havilland Tiger Moth/Miles Master/General Aircraft Hotspur arrived Dec-Jan 1941.
- 238 Sqn, Hurricane IIA, arrived 1 February 1941, departed April 1941.
- 308 (Polish) Sqn, Spitfire IIA, arrived 31 May 1941, departed 24 June 1941.
- 501 (County of Gloucester) Sqn AAF, Spitfire IIA, arrived 25 June 1941, departed 5 August 1941.
- 504 (County of Nottingham) Sqn AAF, Hurricane IIB, arrived 11 August 1941, departed 26 August 1941.
- 245 (Northern Rhodesian) Sqn, Hurricane IIB, arrived 1 September 1941, departed 17 Nov 1941.
- 245 Sqn, Hurricane IIB, arrived 23 Nov 1941, departed 19 Dec 1941.
- 184 Sqn, Hurricane IID, arrived 1 March 1943, departed 11 March 1943.
- 174 (Mauritius) Sqn, Hurricane IIB, arrived 1 March 1943, departed 11 March 1943.

America came into the war after the bombing of Pearl Harbor by the Japanese in late 1941, and the Allies began preparations for the invasion of Europe. RAF Chilbolton was then allocated to the Americans and transferred to the United States Army Air Forces (USAAF), playing host to Army Co-operation Command units.

=== USAAF use ===
Chilbolton was known as USAAF Station AAF-404 for security reasons by the USAAF during the war, and by which it was referred to instead of location. Its USAAF Station Code was "CB".

==== 368th Fighter Group ====
On 1 March 1944 the 12th and 15th Tactical Reconnaissance Squadrons from the 67th Reconnaissance Wing, flying Spitfires and North American P-51 Mustangs, moved in from RAF Aldermaston to make way for a Douglas C-47 Skytrain group, only to be ejected two weeks later when a new fighter group arrived. The 368th had the following fighter squadrons and fuselage codes:

- 395th Fighter Squadron (A7)
- 396th Fighter Squadron (C2)
- 397th Fighter Squadron (D3)

The 368th was a group of Ninth Air Force's 71st Fighter Wing, IX Tactical Air Command.

Chilbolton continued to be retained by the USAAF for use by transports as a staging airfield for cargo operations to and from the Continent and it was not returned to the RAF until March 1945, by which time most of the C-47 groups had been transferred to forward stations in France.

=== Back to RAF Control ===
In the hands of the RAF, Chilbolton played host to a fighter Operational Training Unit – No. 41 OTU – for the rest of the Second World War, and then to several different fighter squadrons equipped with Supermarine Spitfires and Hawker Tempests as the RAF reduced its strength at the end of the war.

- No 41 OTU, Hurricane/Spitfire/Master/Martinet, arrived March 1945, disbanded 26 June 1945.
- 26 (South African) Sqn, Mustang I/Spitfire XIV, arrived 23 May 1945, departed 20 August 1945.
- 183 (Gold Coast) Sqn, Spitfire IX, arrived 17 June 1945, departed 8 October 1945.
- 247 (China-British) Sqn, Tempest F2/Typhoon Ib, arrived 20 August 1945, departed 7 January 1946.
- 222 (Natal) Sqn, Tempest V, arrived 10 August 1945, departed 15 August 1945.
- 54 Sqn, Tempest F2, arrived 15 November 1945, departed 28 June 1946.
- 183 Sqn, Tempest II, arrived 15 November 1945, disbanded 15 November 1945.

==== Into the 'Jet Age' ====
In March 1946, Chilbolton became the first RAF station to operate de Havilland Vampire jets when 247 squadron converted to Vampire FB1's, but by the late summer that year the station was on care and maintenance.

- 247 Sqn, Tempest F2/Vampire F1, arrived 16 February 1946, departed 1 June 1946.
- 247 Sqn, Vampire F1, arrived 12 June 1946, departed 27 June 1946.

The following units were also here at some point:

- No. 1 Fighter Command Servicing Unit
- Satellite of No. 2 School of Army Co-operation (April - May 1941)
- Sub site for No. 3 Maintenance Unit RAF (October 1945 - June 1948)
- No. 122 Airfield Headquarters RAF (February - March 1943)
- No. 124 (Rocket Projectile) Wing RAF (April 1946)
- No. 129 (RAF) Wing RAF (November - December 1945)
- No. 202 Maintenance Unit RAF (April 1950 - June 1954)
- No. 2719 Squadron RAF Regiment
- No. 2723 Squadron RAF Regiment
- No. 2766 Squadron RAF Regiment
- Aircraft for Southern Sector HQ RAF (January - May 1946)

=== Post-war ===
With the facility released from military control in 1946, Vickers Supermarine selected the airfield as a location for conducting flight development programmes of their jet prototypes and development aircraft, remaining for the best part of ten years. Supermarine Attacker, Supermarine Swift and Supermarine Scimitar were developed there as well as many early experimental swept-wing jet fighters. The airfield was also used for some location filming of David Lean's classic film The Sound Barrier in the early 1950s. The Spitfire T Mk IX, a 2-seat trainer and the last Spitfire variant to be built, was also developed and test-flown at Chilbolton for export to India and Eire (Southern Ireland).

Folland Aircraft also occupied another part of the airfield to conduct similar work on their products, chiefly the Midge and Gnat, but were gone by the end of 1961. With their departure, the wartime airfield began to be dismantled, with large sections of runway, perimeter track and loop hardstands being removed for hardcore.

The next organisation to take an active interest in the site was the Space Research Council which, in 1963, set about building a large observatory with what was to become a prominent local landmark - a radio telescope, known as the Chilbolton Observatory, which was built almost in the centre of the airfield, on the wartime main runway. When constructed, the north end of the runway was removed, with a two lane access road replacing the runway and connecting to the local road network. The radio telescope is still in use today. Various other enterprises flourished or faded in the buildings on the periphery of the airfield.

Flying continued on the old airfield during the 1980s when helicopters and light aircraft serving a field-spraying organisation were in residence, using a grass strip built parallel to the main north–south 12/30 runway.

== Current use ==
Today, the perimeter track has been largely reduced to a single-lane farm road as much of the airfield has been returned to agricultural use. A large section of the 06/24 secondary runway still exists, although reduced to half width. In aerial photography, however, much of the former wartime airfield's runways and hardstands can be seen as disturbances on the landscape, giving a ghostly appearance to the area. A large Type B.1 hangar also survives in agricultural use on the Leckford Estate which occupies the SW corner of the former airfield.

Flying still takes place at Chilbolton with the Chilbolton Flying Club having established an airstrip on the former playing fields in front of the old RAF gymnasium with planning consent being obtained in 1992. Today club members fly light aircraft and ultralights from the airstrip.

== See also ==
- List of former Royal Air Force stations
