= Folland Aircraft =

British aircraft manufacturing company

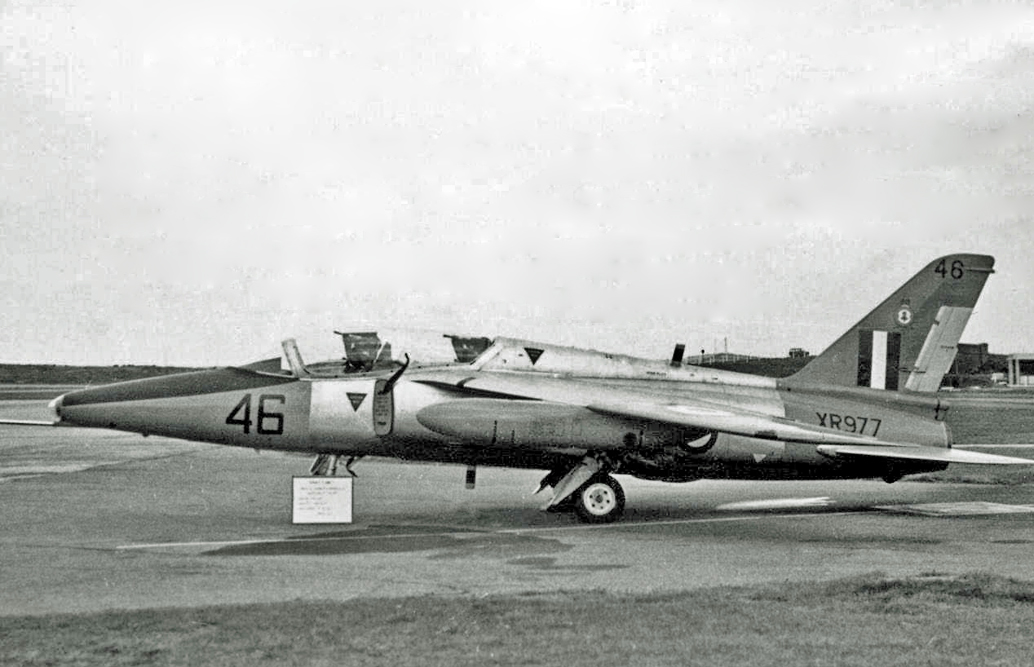
- Gnat T.1 of No. 4 Flying Training School, RAF Valley, in 1967
- Trade name: Folland Aircraft Limited
- Formerly: British Marine Aircraft Limited
- Company type: Limited company
- Industry: Aircraft manufacturing
- Founded: 1936 as British Marine Aircraft Limited
- Founder: Henry Folland
- Defunct: 1963
- Fate: Acquired by Hawker Siddeley in 1959
- Key people: W. E. W. Petter

Folland Aircraft was a British aircraft manufacturing company which was active between 1937 and 1963.

== History ==
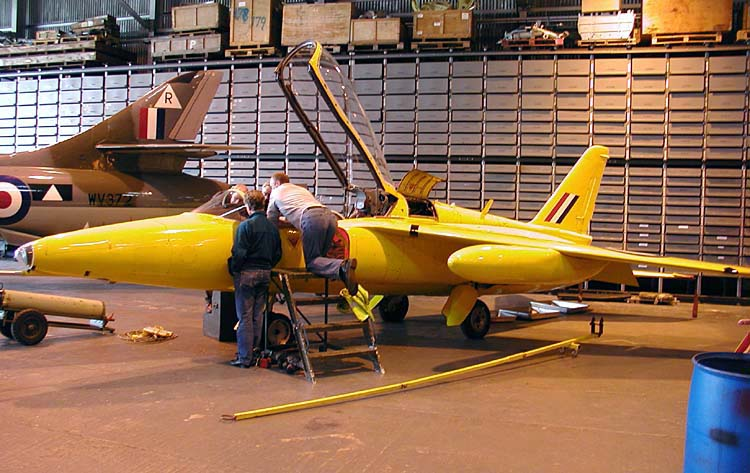
A privately owned Folland Gnat previously used by the RAF Red Arrows display team. It has been painted as an aircraft of the earlier Yellowjacks display team, a forerunner of the Red Arrows.

British Marine Aircraft Limited was formed in February 1936 to produce Sikorsky S-42-A flying boats under licence in the UK. The company built a factory on the western side of the Hamble peninsula with a slipway to Southampton Water. The construction of one Sikorsky based aircraft was started at Hamble, however the company ran out of money and liquidators were appointed. Mergers with other British aircraft companies were considered, including one with Westland Aircraft, but none was followed up.

In 1937 Henry Folland, chief designer of Gloster Aircraft, was looking for a new opportunity to pursue his own ideas without management hindrance. He left Gloster, took over the British Marine site and set up the Folland Aircraft Company. He took the positions of both managing director and aircraft designer.

Folland began aircraft assembly at Hamble making parts for Bristol Blenheim and Beaufort bombers. Follands also made 15,000 rear portions out of the 22,000 constructed for the Supermarine Spitfire. Folland later took on sub-contract work making parts for de Havilland Mosquitos and Vickers Wellingtons.

The first aircraft of its own design to fly was the Folland Fo.108 in 1940. Designed and built to meet the Air Ministry Specification 43/37 for a flying engine testbed it was generally known as the 43/47 or by the nickname "Folland Frightful" from its unusual appearance.

The Folland F.115 and F.116 designs were tendered to meet Specification E.28/40 for a research aircraft to investigate the issues of landing weight for aircraft operating from carriers. The F.116 design was powered by a Centaurus radial and used a variable incidence wing on an airframe estimated at around 18,250 lb (8,300 kg). Two prototypes were ordered but the project was cancelled in 1943 as most of the problems had already been overcome, and neither prototype was completed.

W. E. W. Petter, who had designed the Westland Lysander, English Electric Canberra and English Electric Lightning, joined the company as managing director in 1950. He designed the Folland Midge as an unarmed proof-of-concept demonstrator for a lightweight jet fighter which first flew 11 August 1954. This was followed by the Folland Gnat, the prototype of which, serial number G-39-2, flew on 18 July 1955. Although RAF interest in the possibilities for using the Gnat as a fighter had waned, Folland identified another potential use for the type as an advanced trainer aircraft. The prototype Gnat Trainer conducted its maiden flight on 31 August 1959. Both were built at Hamble until the 1960s with the final Gnat T.1 for the RAF being delivered in May 1965. Follands used an airfield at Chilbolton formerly RAF Chilbolton where they Flight Tested the Folland Midge and the versions of the Folland Gnat.

In 1959 Folland was acquired by Hawker Siddeley which dropped the Folland name in 1963. Ultimately, Folland became part of British Aerospace (BAe). Although Hamble airfield closed in 1986, BAe continued to use the premises there for the production of major assemblies for Harrier and Hawk jets.

== Aircraft ==
- Folland Fo.108
- Folland Midge
- Folland Gnat

== Missiles ==
- Red Dean

== Vessels ==
- Ground Effect Research Machine or hovercraft 1960 – 1 demo only and no commercial production

== Sport ==
The factory also had its own football team created by the workers in 1938. The team is still playing under the name of Folland Sports.

== See also ==
- Aerospace industry in the United Kingdom
