= Folland Gnat =

Type of airplane

Gnat
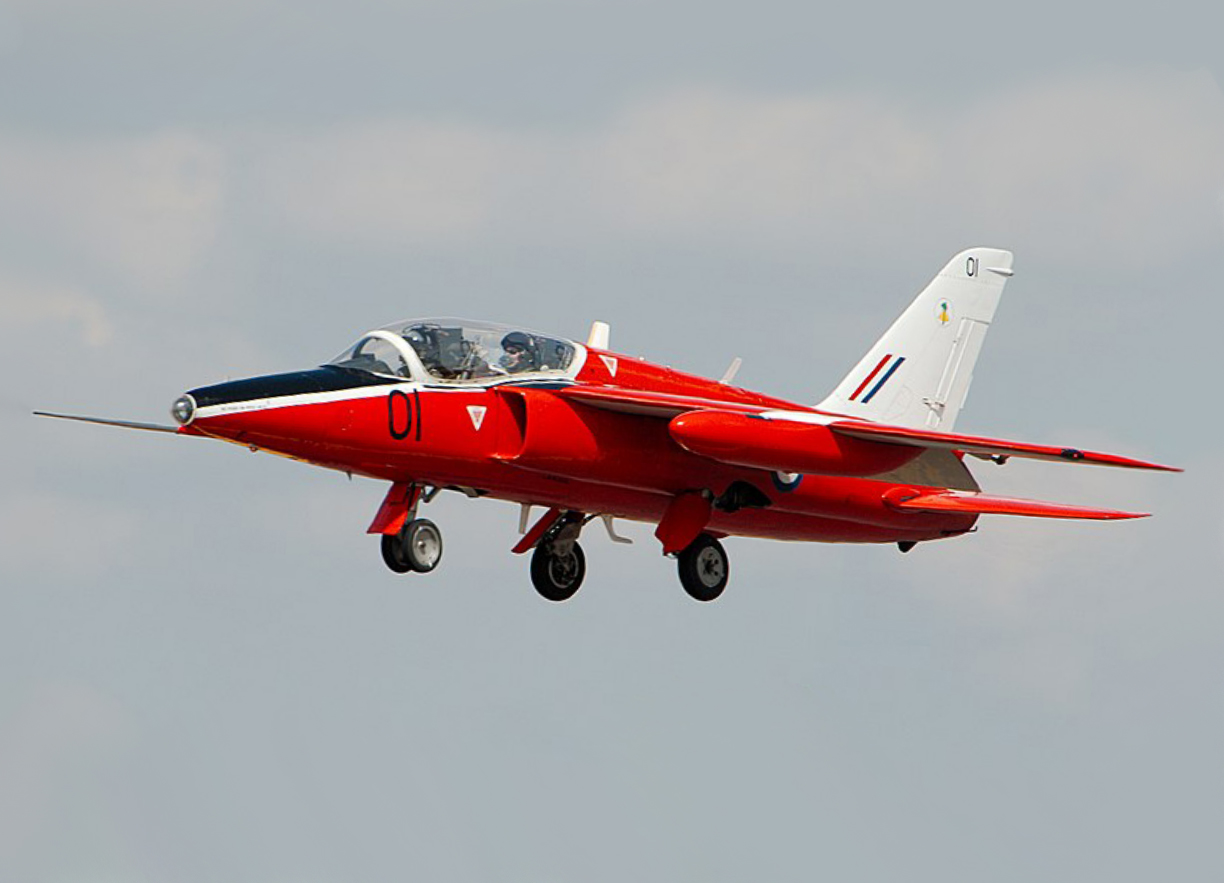
- A Folland Gnat over RIAT, 2018

General information
- Type: Fighter, light tactical bomber and trainer
- Manufacturer: Folland Aircraft
- Designer: W. E. W. Petter
- Status: Retired
- Primary users: Royal Air Force Indian Air Force; Finnish Air Force
- Number built: 449 (including HAL Ajeet)

History
- Introduction date: 1959 (RAF)
- First flight: 18 July 1955
- Retired: 1979 (RAF)
- Developed from: Folland Midge
- Variant: HAL Ajeet

The Folland Gnat is a British compact, swept-wing, subsonic, fighter aircraft that was developed and produced by Folland Aircraft. Envisioned as an affordable light fighter in contrast to the rising cost and size of typical combat aircraft, it was procured as a trainer aircraft for the Royal Air Force (RAF), as well as by export customers, who used the Gnat in both combat and training capacities.

Designed by W. E. W. Petter, the Gnat has its origins in the preceding private-venture Folland Midge. The issuing of Operational Requirement OR.303 by the British Air Ministry served to motivate the type's development; the Gnat was later submitted to meet this requirement. Its design allowed for its construction and maintenance tasks to be carried out without specialised tools, making it suitable for use in countries that had not yet become highly industrialised. The Gnat has been viewed as a major motivating factor towards the issuing of the NATO NBMR-1 requirement, which sought to make available a common strike/attack light fighter with which to equip the air forces of the various NATO members.

Although never used as a fighter by the RAF, the Gnat T.1 jet trainer variant was adopted and operated for some time. In the United Kingdom, the Gnat became well known due to its prominent use as the display aircraft of the RAF's Red Arrows aerobatic team. The Gnat F.1 was exported to Finland, Yugoslavia, and India. On 31 July 1958, Lauri Pekuri became the first Finnish pilot to break the sound barrier while flying a Gnat. The Indian Air Force (IAF) became the largest operator and eventually manufactured the aircraft under licence. Impressed by its performance during combat, the IAF proceeded to develop and procured the improved HAL Ajeet, a modified variant of the Gnat. In British service, the Gnat was replaced by the Hawker Siddeley Hawk.

== Development ==
=== Origins ===
In October 1950, W. E. W. "Teddy" Petter, a British aircraft designer formerly of Westland Aircraft and English Electric, joined Folland Aircraft as its managing director and chief engineer. Almost immediately upon joining the firm, Petter conducted a study into the economics behind modern fighter manufacturing and concluded that many combat aircraft entailed far too great a cost in terms of man-hours and material to be readily mass-produced during a major conflict. While the British Air Staff emphasised quality over quantity, the economics involved in the anticipated vast wartime production of many of the RAF's aircraft of the time, such as the Hawker Hunter and the Gloster Javelin interceptors, were viewed as questionable.

Petter examined the prospects for producing a more affordable but capable "light fighter", including a survey of available modern engines to power the type. Having identified suitable powerplant arrangements along with methods of making multiple key design aspects, such as the manufacturing of the fuselage and wings, more affordable, Folland promptly commenced work upon this lightweight fighter concept, financing the project using existing company funds. The light fighter project soon received the Fo-141 designation along with the name Gnat. Development of the Gnat and the specifics of its design were heavily influenced by the issuing of Operational Requirement OR.303, which sought a capable lightweight fighter aircraft. Work to develop the Gnat went ahead, irrespective of any external orders or financing; no funding was provided to support the type's early development from any British government department, such as the Ministry of Supply.

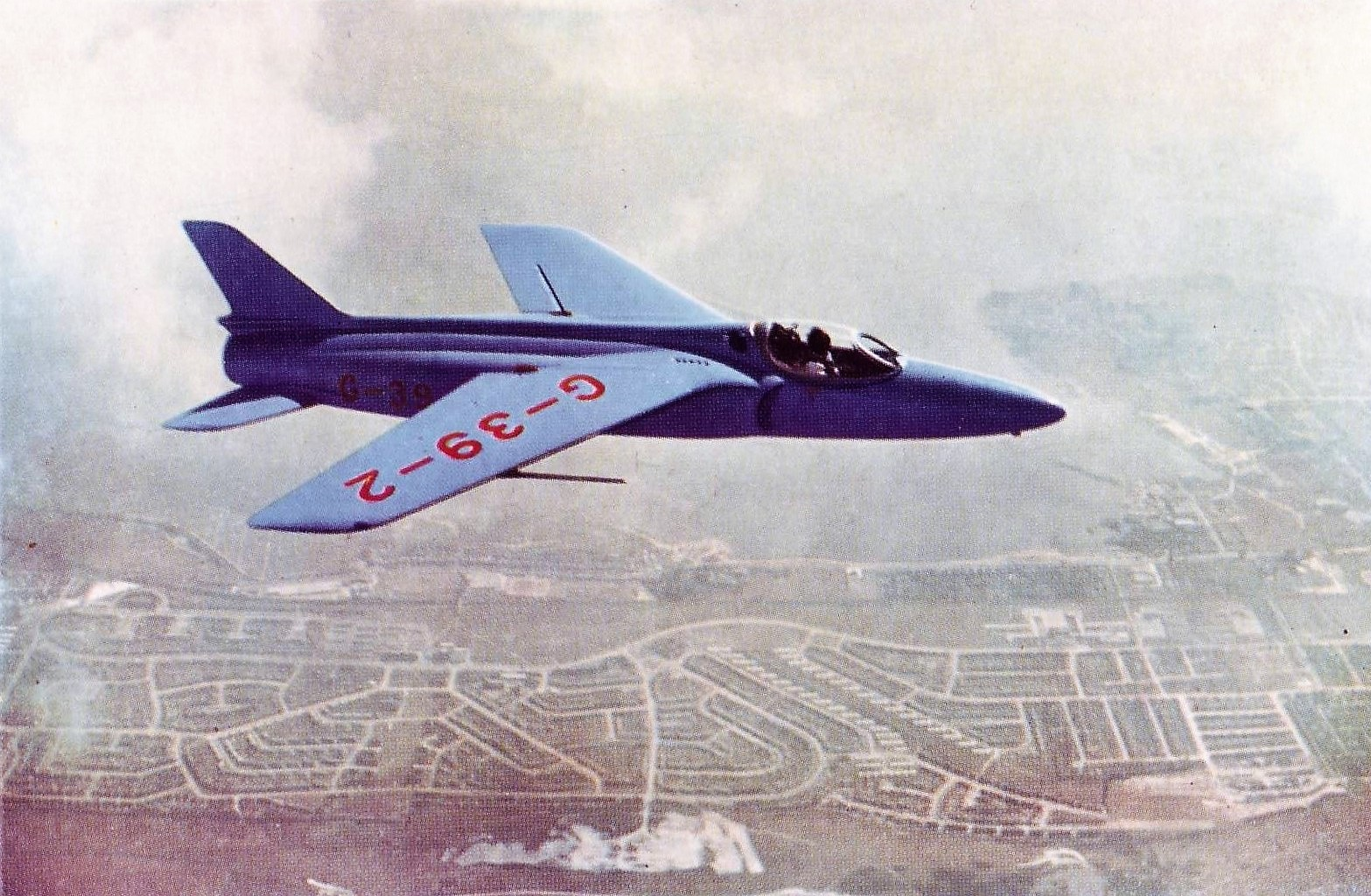
First Gnat F.1 prototype

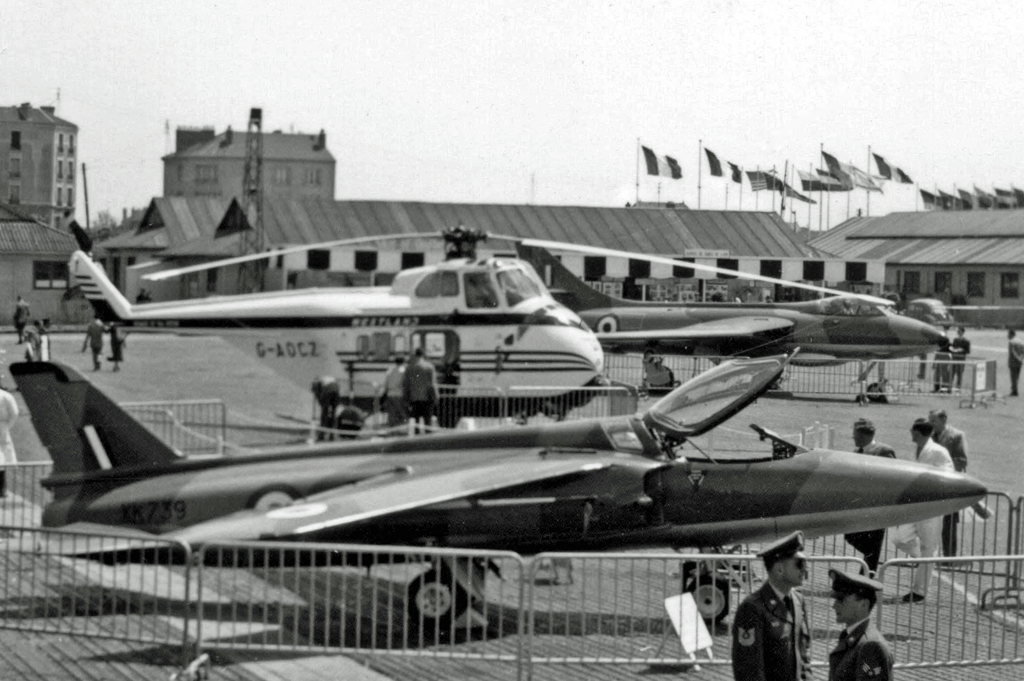
Gnat F.1 single-seat fighter variant at the 1957 Paris Air Salon

Petter believed that a compact and simplified fighter would offer the advantages of low purchase and operational costs, and that the Gnat should be capable of being manufactured both cheaply and easily. The emergence of new lightweight turbojet engines, several of which were well advanced in their own development process, also enabled the envisioned light fighter concept to be realised. The Gnat was initially intended to be powered by a Bristol BE-22 Saturn turbojet engine, capable of generating 3,800 lbf (16.9 kN 1,724 kgp) of thrust. However, development of the Saturn was cancelled; in its place, the more capable but not immediately available Bristol Orpheus turbojet engine was adopted, instead.

So the project would not be delayed before reaching the prototype stage, Petter's unarmed proof-of-concept demonstrator for the Gnat was instead powered by the less powerful Armstrong Siddeley Viper 101 turbojet engine, capable of generating 1,640 lbf (7.3 kN / 744 kgp) of thrust. While using a different powerplant from later-built prototypes and production aircraft, the demonstrator still used a nearly identical airframe along with similar onboard systems so that these could be proved in advance of the Gnat itself being built. This demonstrator was designated Fo-139 Midge. On 11 August 1954, the Midge performed its maiden flight, piloted by Folland's chief test pilot Edward Tennant. Despite the low-powered engine, the compact jet was able to break Mach 1 while in a dive and proved to be very agile during its flying trials. On 26 September 1955, the Midge was destroyed in a crash, which had possibly been due to human error by a pilot from a potential overseas purchaser.

The Midge, partly due to its nature as a private venture, had only a short lifespan, but had served as a proof-of-concept demonstrator for the subsequent aircraft. It had failed to interest the RAF as a combat aircraft at that time, but officers did issue encouragement of the development of a similar aircraft for training purposes. The larger Gnat, which was being developed in parallel with the Midge, was an improved version of the original fighter design; it was differentiated by larger air intakes to suit the Orpheus engine, a slightly larger wing, and provision for the installation of a 30 mm ADEN cannon in each intake lip. The first prototype Gnat was built as a private venture by Folland. Subsequently, six further aircraft were ordered by the British Ministry of Supply for evaluation purposes. On 18 July 1955, the Folland prototype, serial number G-39-2, first flew from RAF Boscombe Down, Wiltshire. (Note: It had been moved from the Folland factory at Hamble by road earlier in the day; after a 15-minute flight, the Gnat landed at Chilbolton airfield, Hampshire.)

Although the evaluation by the British brought no orders for the lightweight fighter, orders were placed by Finland and Yugoslavia. India placed a large order for the type, which included a licence for production by Hindustan Aeronautics Limited (HAL). Although the Gnat's development is considered a factor which motivated the Mutual Weapons Development Team to issue the NATO NBMR-1 requirement for a low-level strike/attack light fighter, the Gnat itself was not evaluated in the competition, which was won by the Fiat G.91. However, the Gnat was evaluated in 1958 by the RAF as a replacement for the de Havilland Venom, as well as other light aircraft such as the BAC Jet Provost. The Hawker Hunter was selected as the eventual winner of the fly-off competition.

=== Trainer ===
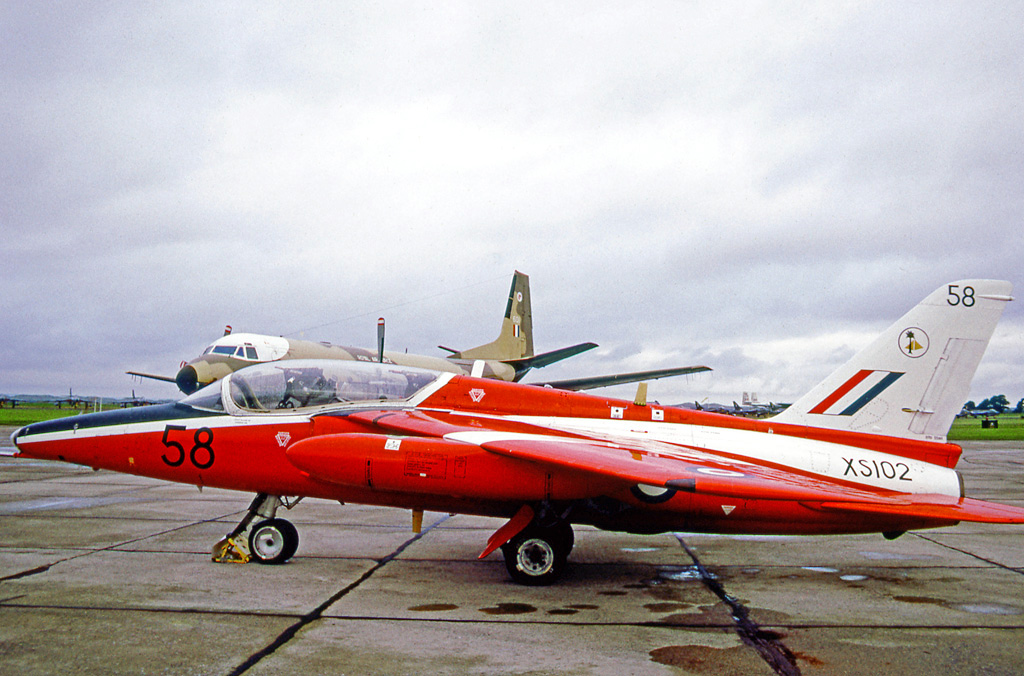
Operational Gnat T.1 of No. 4 Flying Training School RAF in 1971

Although RAF interest in the possibilities for using the Gnat as a fighter had waned, Folland identified a potential use for the type as a trainer aircraft. Accordingly, the aircraft was modified to conform with the requirements of Specification T.185D, which had called for an advanced two-seat trainer aircraft that could transition pilots between the current de Havilland Vampire T 11 and operational fighters, such as the supersonic English Electric Lightning.

Folland proposed the two-seat Fo. 144 Gnat Trainer. The trainer model featured several changes, including the adoption of a new wing with additional fuel capacity, which in turn allowed for more internal space within the fuselage to be allocated for additional equipment. A more powerful variant of the Orpheus engine was also used, while the length of the forward fuselage area was increased, and the tail surfaces were enlarged. The inboard ailerons of the fighter variant were reconfigured to an arrangement of outboard ailerons and conventional flaps. On 7 January 1958, an initial contract for 14 preproduction Gnat trainers was issued.

On 31 August 1959, the prototype Gnat Trainer conducted its maiden flight from Chilbolton Airfield, Hampshire. The ministry did not at first place a production order, as they were concerned about the size and ability of the company to take on a large order. Following the takeover of Folland by Hawker Siddeley Aviation (becoming the Hamble division), further orders for 30, 20, and 41 trainers were placed between February 1960 and March 1962, receiving the designation Gnat T Mk. 1. The final Gnat T.1 for the RAF was delivered in May 1965.

=== Further development ===
Folland sought to develop more capable versions of the Gnat; one of the more substantial of these proposals was tentatively designated as the Gnat Mk.5. This model was to be capable of supersonic speeds and was intended to be made available in both single-seat and twin-seat configurations, enabling its use in the trainer and interceptor role. The Gnat 5 was to be powered by either a pair of Rolls-Royce RB153R engines or two Viper 20 engines; in the interceptor role, it would be also equipped with a Ferranti AI.23 Airpass radar and armed with a pair of de Havilland Firestreak air-to-air missiles. Featuring an estimated maximum speed around Mach 2 (2,500 km/h; 1,500 mph) and a time to 50,000 ft (15,000 m) of 3 minutes, Folland estimated that a prototype could be flown as early as the end of 1962 and that the Gnat 5 could be readied for operational service within four or five years.

In 1960, Maurice Brennan joined Folland as its chief engineer and director. Hawker Siddeley wanted to use his knowledge of variable-geometry wings in future designs. Under his direction, a variable-geometry wing was applied to the basic Gnat 5 design to produce two different configurations – one tailless and one with a conventional tail – for a multipurpose fighter/strike/trainer, designated the Fo.147. The design used a unique mechanism to sweep the wings; this mechanism used a combination of tracks positioned on the fuselage sides, the centerline, and on the underside of the wings, and was actuated by hydraulically driven ball screws positioned at the inner ends of the wings. The wings could be swept from 20 to 70°; at the 70° position, longitudinal control was maintained by wing tip-mounted elevons, and at the 20° position by a retractable canard arrangement. Autostabilisation was also to be used. By providing trimming with the canard, a large tailplane was not needed, as would have been on designs without a canard configuration.

The Fo.147 was to have been capable of speeds in excess of Mach 2, with the speed limit set by the temperature of the structure as a result of kinetic heating. It had a maximum all-up weight of 18,500 lb (8,400 kg), comparing well with the Gnat 5's more restrictive 11,100 lb (5,000 kg) maximum. According to aviation author Derek Wood, the Fo.147: "would have provided a first-class flying test-bed for variable geometry theories...even a VG conversion of the standard Gnat Mk 2 fighter would have been an invaluable research tool". However, neither the Fo.147 nor its successor, the Fo.148, would be developed to the prototype stage; the RAF showed little interest in the need for a variable-geometry trainer, although it intended to procure the General Dynamics F-111K strike aircraft.

== Design ==
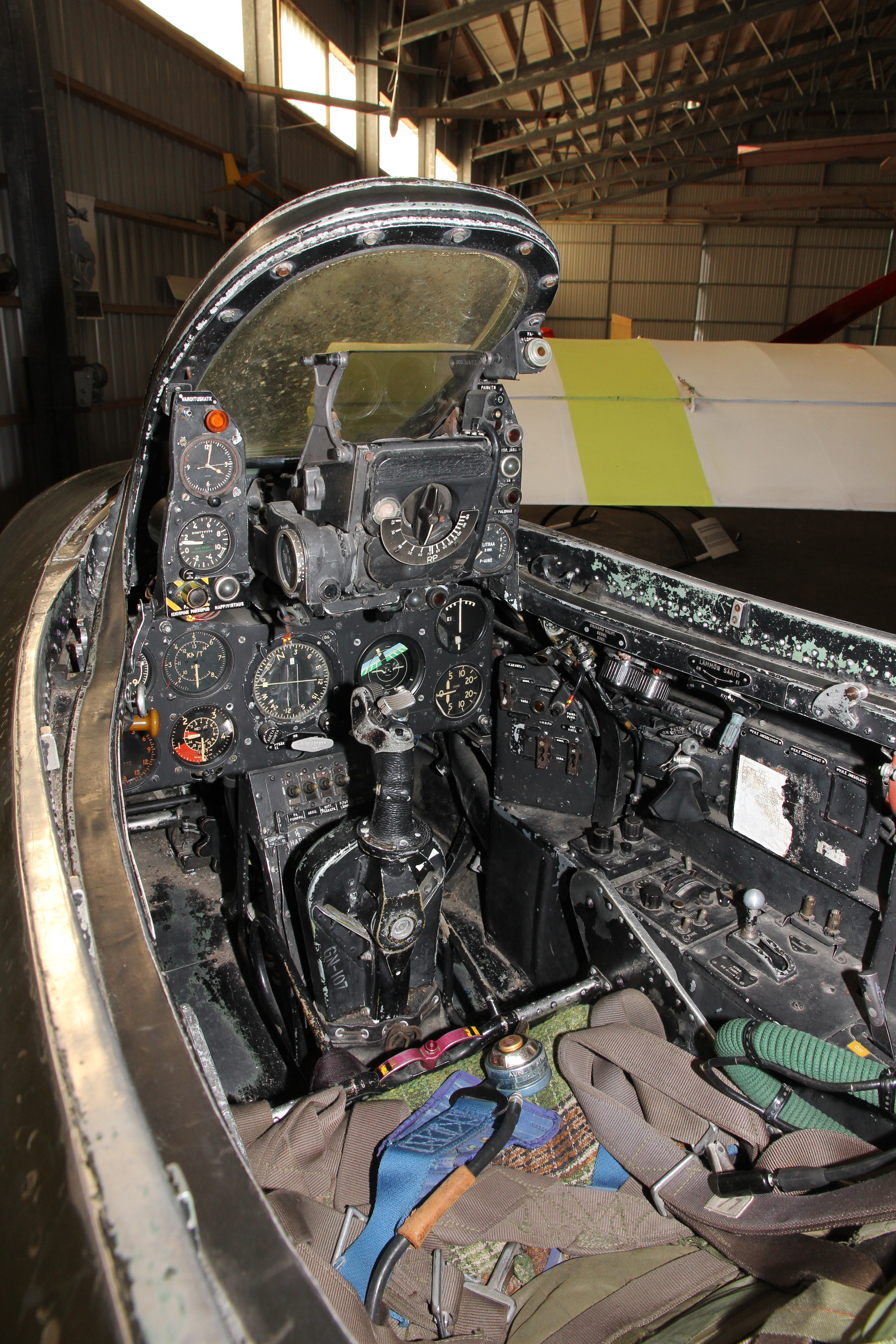
Folland Gnat Mk.1 cockpit

The Folland Gnat was a purpose-built light fighter aircraft, suitable as both a trainer and a combat aircraft in ground-attack and day-fighter roles. Despite its compact dimensions, the cockpit offered many features expected in standard fighter aircraft of the era, including full pressurisation, climate control, and an ejection seat. According to Folland, the Gnat offered advantages over conventional fighter aircraft in terms of cost, man-hours, handling, serviceability, and portability. The combination of low overall weight and the use of a tricycle landing gear arrangement permitted the aircraft to operate from austere grass airstrips.

The fuselage of the Gnat comprised a conventional metal stressed skin structure with extensive flush-rivetting. To reduce workload and cost, intensive fabrication methods such as machining, forging, and casting were minimised. The airframe could be constructed using simple jigs without any specialised skills or tooling. The wing could be produced at a quarter of the cost and with less than one-fifth of the labour required for the wings of other contemporary fighter aircraft. Similarly, the layout and construction techniques used allow the airframe to be rapidly disassembled into its major subsections without the use of cranes or ladders; accordingly, the Gnat was vastly easier to service than most other aircraft.

== Operational history ==
=== Finland ===
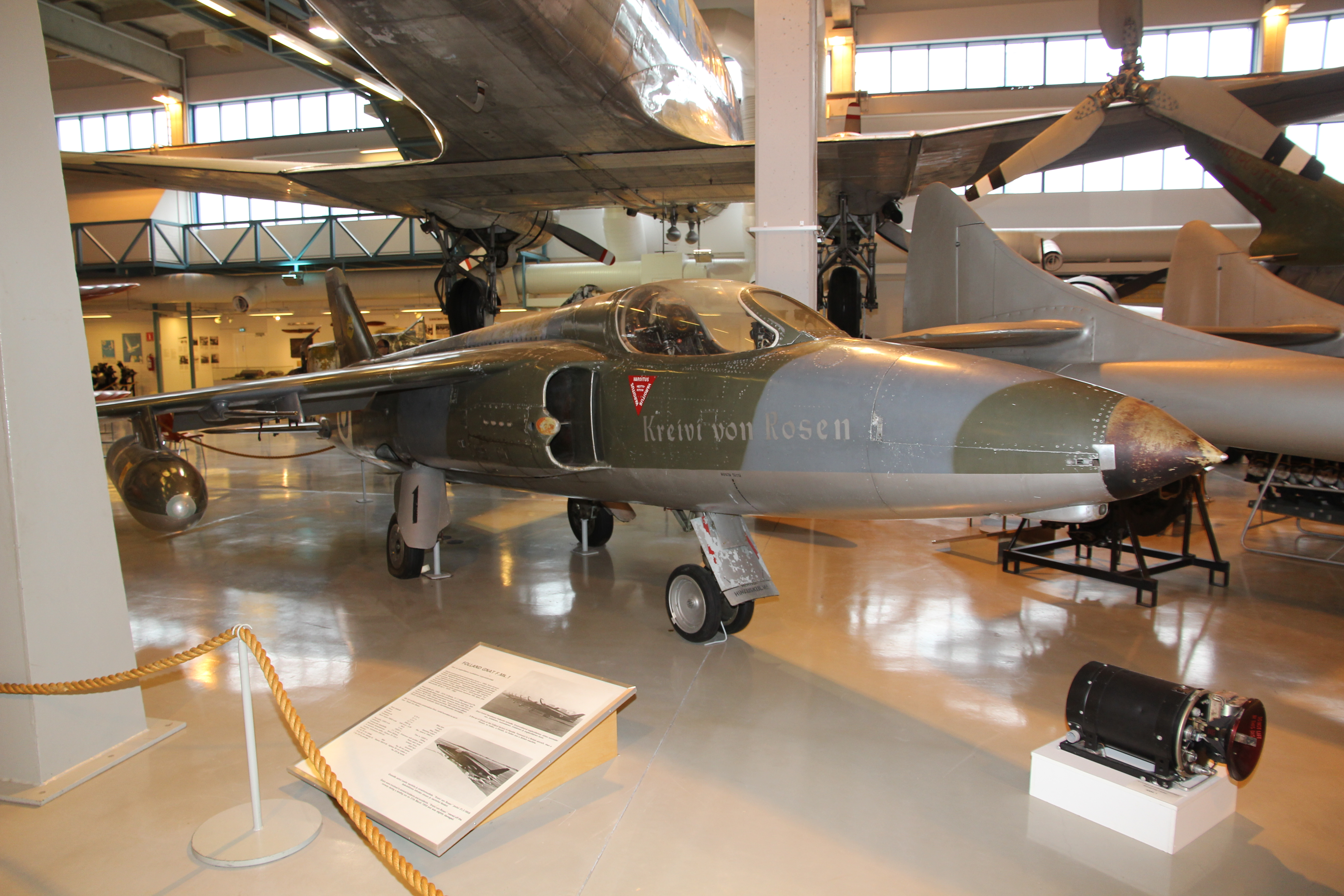
A preserved Gnat Mk.1 in the Aviation Museum of Central Finland

The Finnish Air Force received the first of its 13 Gnats (11 fighters and 2 photo-reconnaissance planes) on 30 July 1958. It was soon found to be a problematic aircraft in service and required a lot of ground maintenance. In early 1957, a licence agreement was reached to allow Valmet to build the Gnat at Tampere in Finland, although, in the end, none were built. On 31 July 1958, Finnish Air Force Major Lauri Pekuri, a fighter ace of the Second World War, became the first Finnish pilot to break the sound barrier while flying a Gnat at Lake Luonetjärvi.

The Gnat F.1 proved to be initially problematic in the harsh Finnish conditions. Finland was the first operational user of the Gnat F.1, and the aircraft still had many issues yet to be resolved. All Gnats were grounded for half a year on 26 August 1958 after the destruction of GN-102 due to a technical design error in its hydraulic system, and the aircraft soon became the subject of severe criticism. Three other aircraft were also destroyed in other accidents, with two pilots ejecting and one being killed. Once the initial problems were ironed out, the plane proved to be extremely manoeuvrable and had good performance in the air, but also to be very maintenance intensive. The availability of spare parts was always an issue, and its maintenance a challenge to the conscript mechanics. The Gnats were removed from active service in 1972 when the Häme Wing moved to Rovaniemi, and when the new Saab 35 Drakens were brought into use.

=== India ===
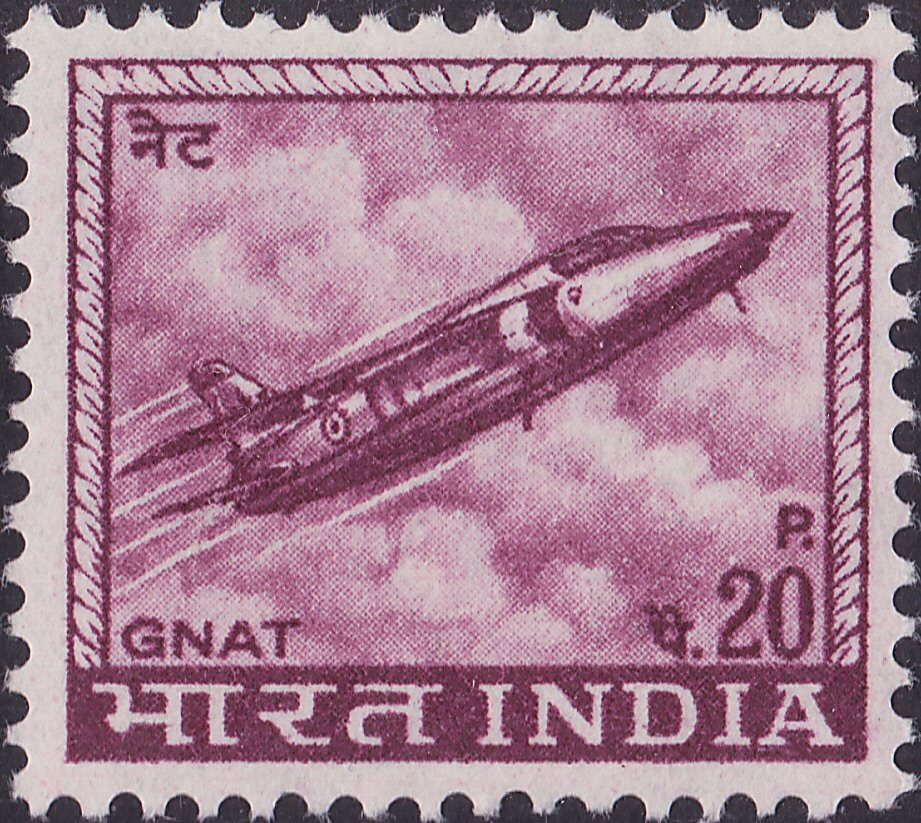
1967 India Post stamp

In September 1956, the Indian government signed a contract for the production of the aircraft and Orpheus engine in India. The first 13 aircraft for the Indian Air Force (IAF) were assembled at Hamble-le-Rice, they were followed by partly completed aircraft and then sub-assemblies as Hindustan Aircraft slowly took over first assembly, and then production of the aircraft. The first flight of an Indian Air Force Gnat was in the United Kingdom on 11 January 1958; it was delivered to India in the hold of a C-119, and accepted by the Air Force on 30 January 1958. The first Gnat squadron was the No. 23 (Cheetah), which converted from Vampire FB.52 on 18 March 1960 using six Folland-built Gnats. The first aircraft built from Indian-built parts first flew in May 1962. The last Indian-built Gnat F.1 was delivered on 31 January 1974.

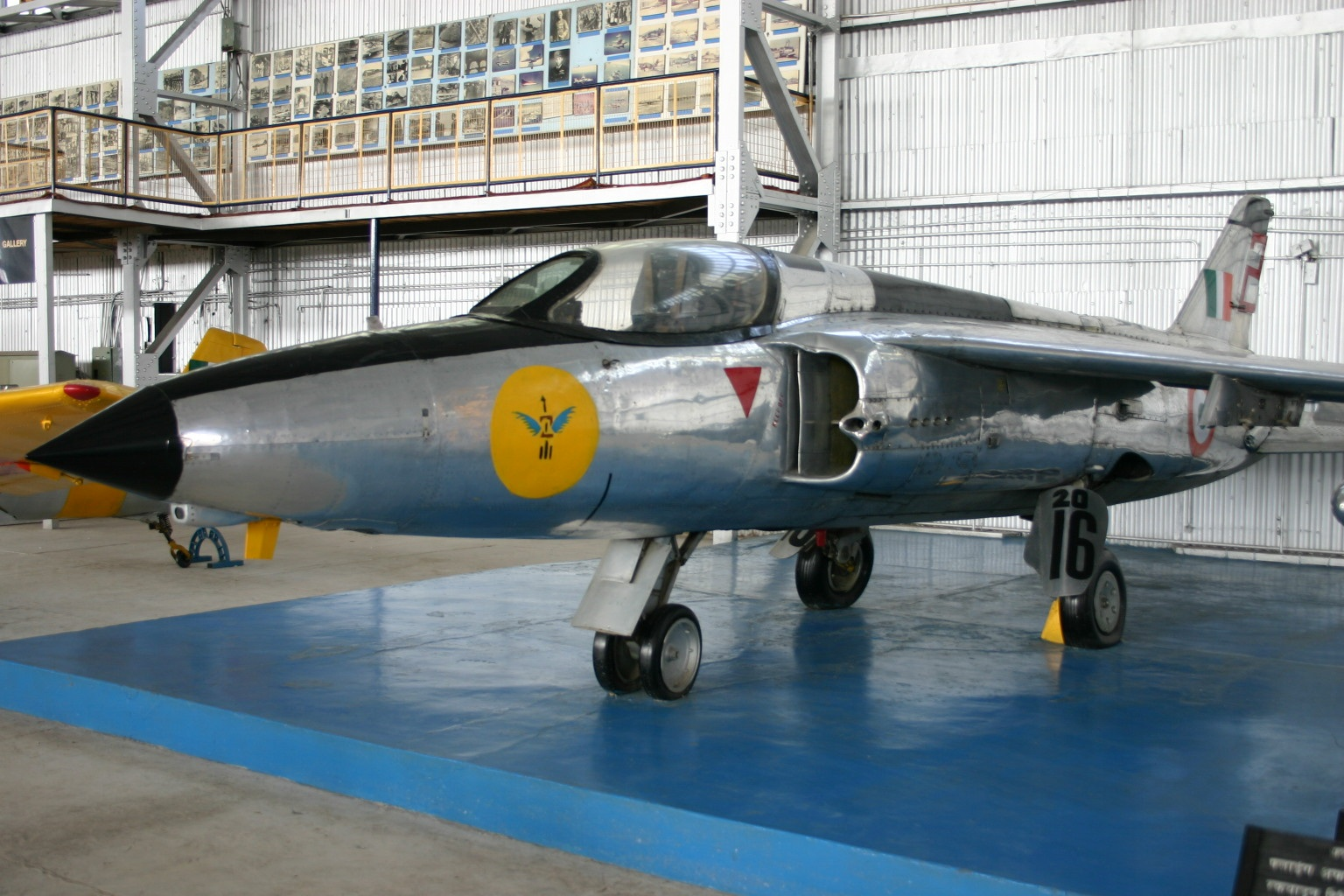
IAF Folland Gnat ("Sabre slayer")

Unlike the RAF, the IAF did not operate trainer variants of the Gnat. The Gnat had a tendency to pitch up sharply on raising the undercarriage; almost all new pilots would find it difficult to control the anticipated pitch up. Consequently, the Gnat was an extremely difficult aircraft to handle in the early stages of training, so IAF pilots generally qualified first on Hawker Hunter trainers, which gave them experience on powered controls. A pilot would then do a brief full throttle run on the runway in the Gnat, before flying solo. With sufficient experience, pilots would exploit the nimble mini-sized aircraft to its limits.

The Gnat proved to be a frustrating opponent for the larger and heavier Canadair Sabre operated by Pakistan. The Gnat's success during the 1965 and 1971 Indo-Pakistani Wars was dependent on tactics, pilot skill, and sortie context. Tactics utilised by IAF Gnat pilots included drawing Sabre pilots into vertical contests, where the Sabres were at a disadvantage. As the Gnat was lightweight and compact in shape, it was hard to see, especially at the low levels where most dogfights took place.

Gnats have been credited by many independent and Indian sources as having shot down seven Pakistani North American F-86 Sabres in the Indo-Pakistani War of 1965. One Gnat was captured by Pakistani forces, following a forced landing, during the initial phase of the 1965 war. IAF Squadron Leader Brij Pal Singh Sikand later reported that he had experienced a complete electrical failure on his Gnat, after separating from his formation to fight a lone Sabre; Sikand landed at an abandoned Pakistani airstrip at Pasrur. Two PAF Lockheed F-104 Starfighter pilots subsequently claimed a role in forcing down Sikand's Gnat. (This Gnat has since been displayed at the Pakistan Air Force Museum, Karachi.) On 16 December 1965, after a ceasefire was agreed, a Pakistani Cessna O-1 was also shot down by a Gnat pilot.

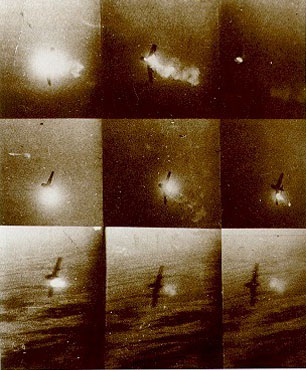
PAF Sabre being shot down in combat by an IAF Gnat in September 1965.

Gnats were used again by India in the Indo-Pakistani War of 1971. Apart from air defence operations, in the Bangladesh Liberation War, Gnats flew anti-shipping operations, ground attack, bomber/transport escort and close air support operations. During the Battle of Boyra the first dogfights over East Pakistan (Bangladesh) took place. IAF Gnats shot down two PAF Canadair Sabres and badly damaged one. Another dogfight involving a Gnat was over Srinagar airfield where a lone Indian pilot held out against six Sabres, shooting two in the process, before being shot down. Gnat pilot Nirmal Jit Singh Sekhon was posthumously honoured with the Param Vir Chakra (India's highest gallantry award), becoming the only member of the IAF to be given the award.

The Gnat was nicknamed "Sabre Slayer" within the IAF, since most of its combat kills during the two wars were against PAF Sabres – despite the Canadair Sabre Mk 6 being widely regarded as the best dogfighter of its era. Tactics called for Gnats taking on the Sabres in the vertical, where the Sabres were at a disadvantage. As the Gnat was lightweight and compact in shape, it was hard to see, especially at the low levels where most dogfights took place. While the IAF was impressed by the Gnat's performance in the two wars, the aircraft had many technical problems including hydraulics, a temperamental pair of Aden 30 mm cannons which often failed in-flight, significant "bent thrust" on take-off, leading to many aborted take-offs and an unreliable control system. To address these failings, the IAF issued a requirement for an improved "Gnat II" in 1972, at first specifying that the new version was to be optimised as an interceptor but then expanding the specification to include ground attack. Over 175 of an Hindustan Aeronautics Limited licence-built variant, the HAL Ajeet (ajeet meaning "unconquerable"), were produced in Bangalore. The Ajeet, in effect, expanded the IAF's Gnat fleet, and the two types were reportedly phased out in tandem, with their final retirement occurring in 1991.

Several ex-IAF Folland Gnats have survived, in private hands. Some Gnats, including one that had participated in the 1971 war in East Pakistan, were presented to the Bangladesh Air Force.

=== United Kingdom ===
The first production Gnat T.1s for the Royal Air Force (RAF) were delivered in February 1962 to the Central Flying School at RAF Little Rissington. The major operator of the type was 4 Flying Training School at RAF Valley, the first aircraft being delivered in November 1962. In 1964, 4 FTS formed the Yellowjacks aerobatic team with all-yellow painted Gnats. The team reformed in 1965 as part of the Central Flying School as the Red Arrows which operated the Gnat until 1979 as the RAF aerobatic demonstration team. On 14 May 1965, the last RAF Gnat T.1 to be built was delivered to the Red Arrows.

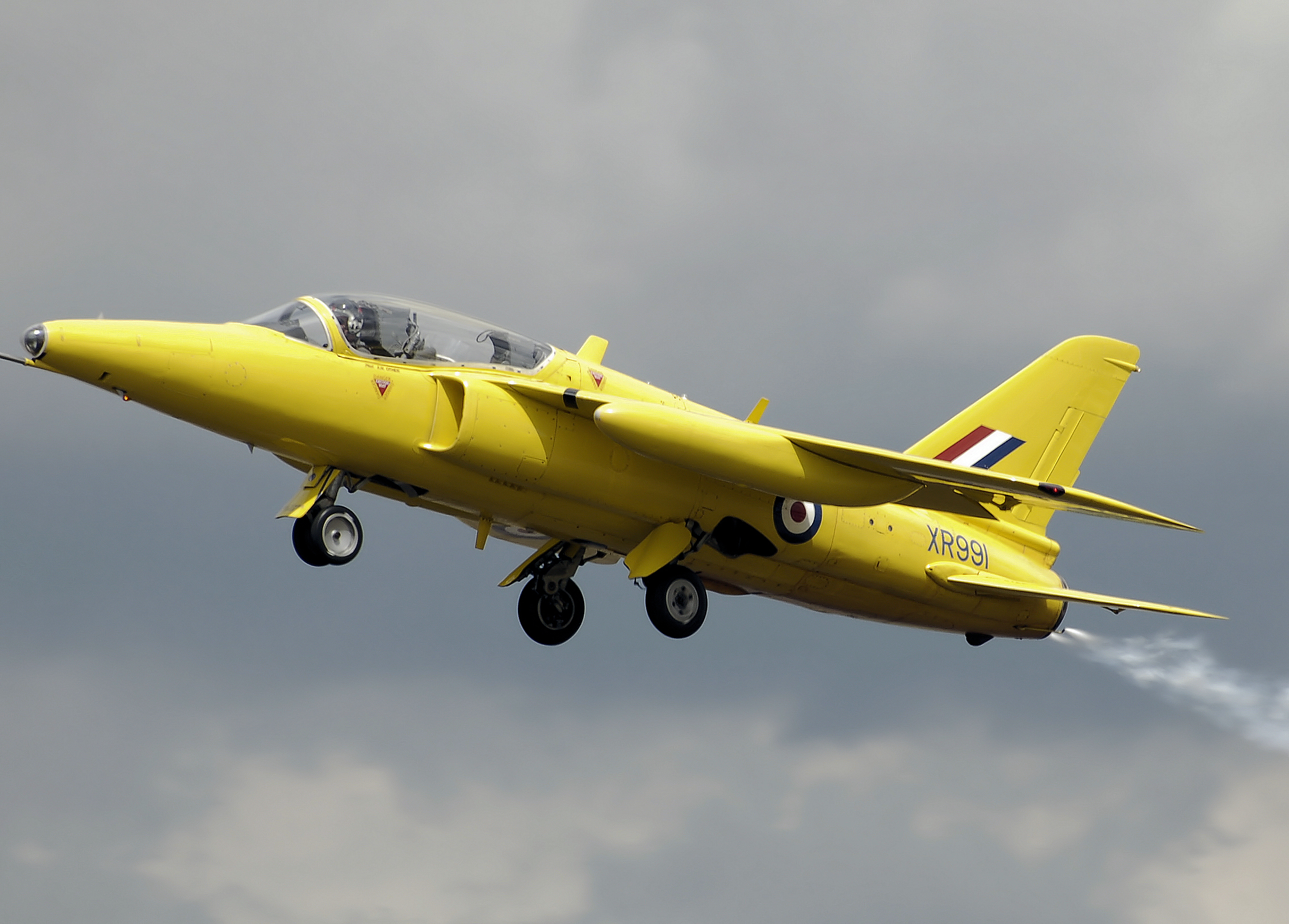
Privately owned Gnat T.1 displaying at the 2008 Kemble Air Day

Once pilots graduated from basic training on the BAC Jet Provost and gained their wings they were selected for one of three streams: fast jet, multi-engined, or helicopter. Those selected for fast jets were posted to RAF Valley for advanced training on the Gnat T.1, typically 70 hours of flying. Students would then move on to operational training using the Hawker Hunter, followed by a posting to an operational conversion unit for the type of aircraft to be flown.

Following the introduction of the Hawker Siddeley Hawk into the training role as a replacement the Gnats were withdrawn from service. The largest operator 4 FTS retired its last Gnat in November 1978. Most of the retired Gnats were delivered to No. 1 School of Technical Training at RAF Halton and other training establishments to be used as ground training airframes. When the RAF had no need for the Gnats as training airframes they were sold off. Many were bought by private operators and some are still flying today. The final RAF operator of the Gnat was the Red Arrows, which retained their aircraft through the 1979 display season. The team received its first Hawk in August 1979 and converted fully from the Gnat for the 1980 display season.

=== Yugoslavia ===
Yugoslavia ordered two Gnat F.1s for evaluation; the first aircraft flew on 7 June 1958 and both were delivered to Yugoslavia by rail. The aircraft were flown by the flight test centre but no further aircraft were ordered. One aircraft was destroyed in a crash in October 1958 while the other is preserved and on display in Serbia.

== Variants ==
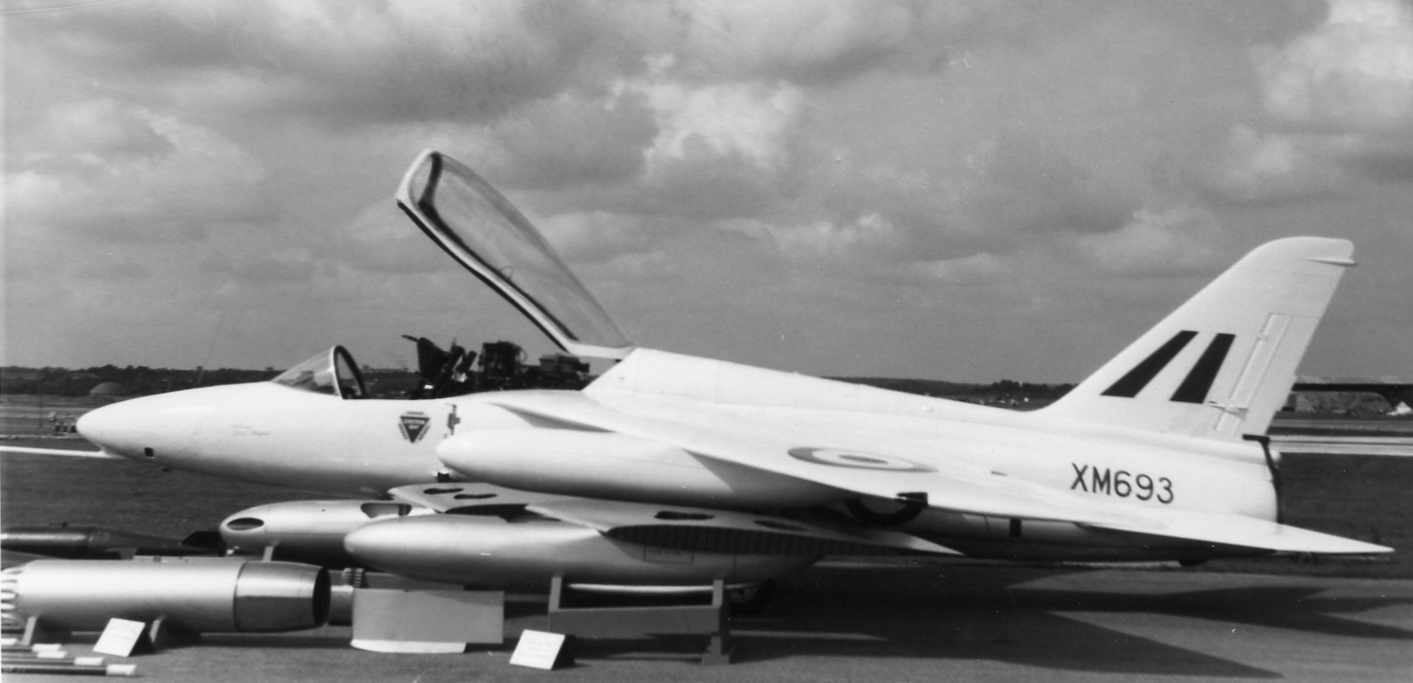
The third prototype of the Gnat T.1, XM693 at the SBAC show in 1961, showing the short nose of the early aircraft. It now guards the old Folland plant at Hamble, though painted as a Red Arrows aircraft

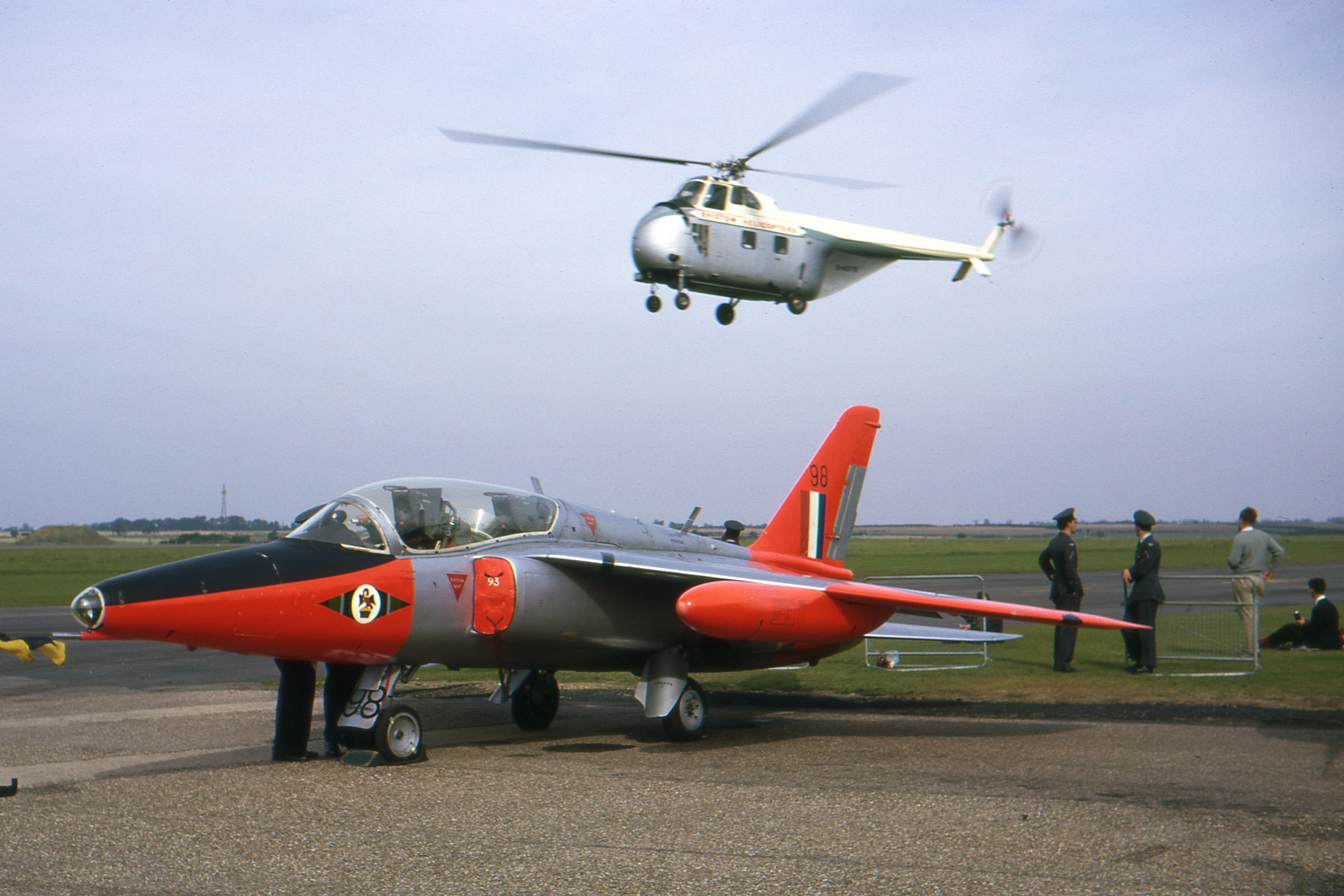
Folland Gnat at RAF Waterbeach, Cambridgeshire on Battle of Britain Day, 14 September 1963

Fo.140 Gnat
Private-venture prototype fighter, one built.
Fo.141 Gnat

Gnat F.1

Single seat lightweight fighter exported to Finland, India and Yugoslavia, 50 built by Folland at Hamble. This was also built in India under licence as the HAL Gnat.

Gnat FR.1

One aircraft for Finland was built with three nose-mounted 70mm Vinten cameras and designated FR.1, it was joined by a Ministry of Supply aircraft purchased by Folland and modified to the same standard. Both aircraft were delivered to Finland on 12 October 1960.
Fo.142 Gnat / Gnat F.2
This was to be an improved F.1 using a wing with a 6% thickness-to-chord ratio and powered by a Bristol Orpheus with simplified reheat (BOr.12SR), developing 8,000 lbF (35.6 kN) thrust. A prototype wing was built but not mated to a fuselage or engine. It was anticipated that this would be capable of M 1.5 and have a "marked increase in rate of climb" Development was ended because Bristol declined to back development of the reheat.
Fo.143 Gnat / Gnat F.4
Proposed improved F.2 with air intercept radar and ability to carry guided weapons, not built.
Fo.144 Gnat Trainer / Gnat T.1
Two-seat advanced trainer aircraft for the Royal Air Force, 105 built by Hawker Siddeley.
Gnat F.5
Proposed development from January 1960, with larger wing (and flap) area. It was to be powered by two Rolls-Royce RB153 engines with reheat. The design also considered operation from aircraft carriers.
Fo.146
This was a two-seat design with variable geometry wings based on a combination of the Gnat Mk5 and the Gnat Trainer. It was to be powered by two Rolls-Royce RB153 engines with reheat and thrust-reversers. it was to be produced as either an advanced trainer with weapons capability or as a fighter. This, and later studies were led by Maurice Brennan.
HAL Ajeet
Indian development of the Gnat F.1
HAL Ajeet Trainer
Two-seat tandem trainer version for the Indian Air Force. This version was derived from the HAL Ajeet and differed considerably from the Gnat T.1 used by the RAF.

== Operators ==
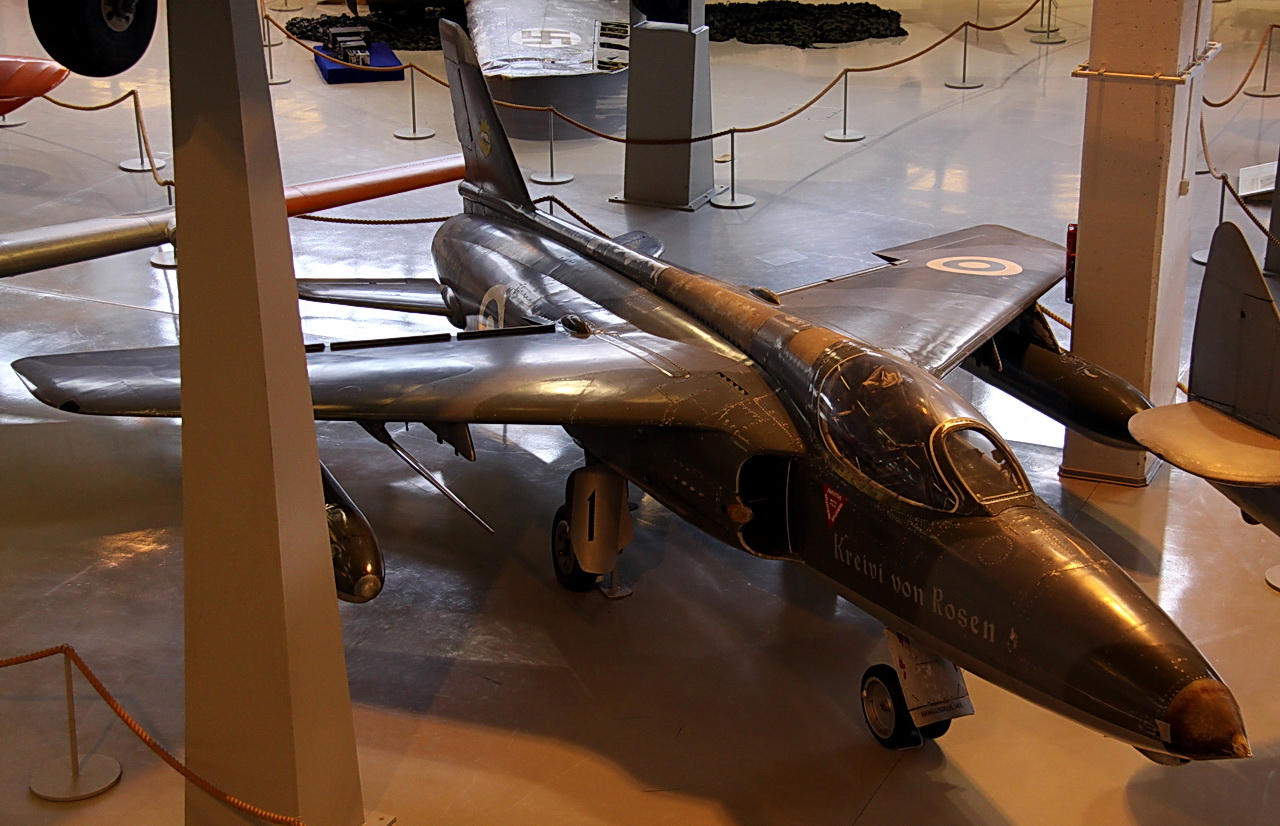
Folland Gnat Mk.1 (GN-101) in Aviation Museum of Central Finland.

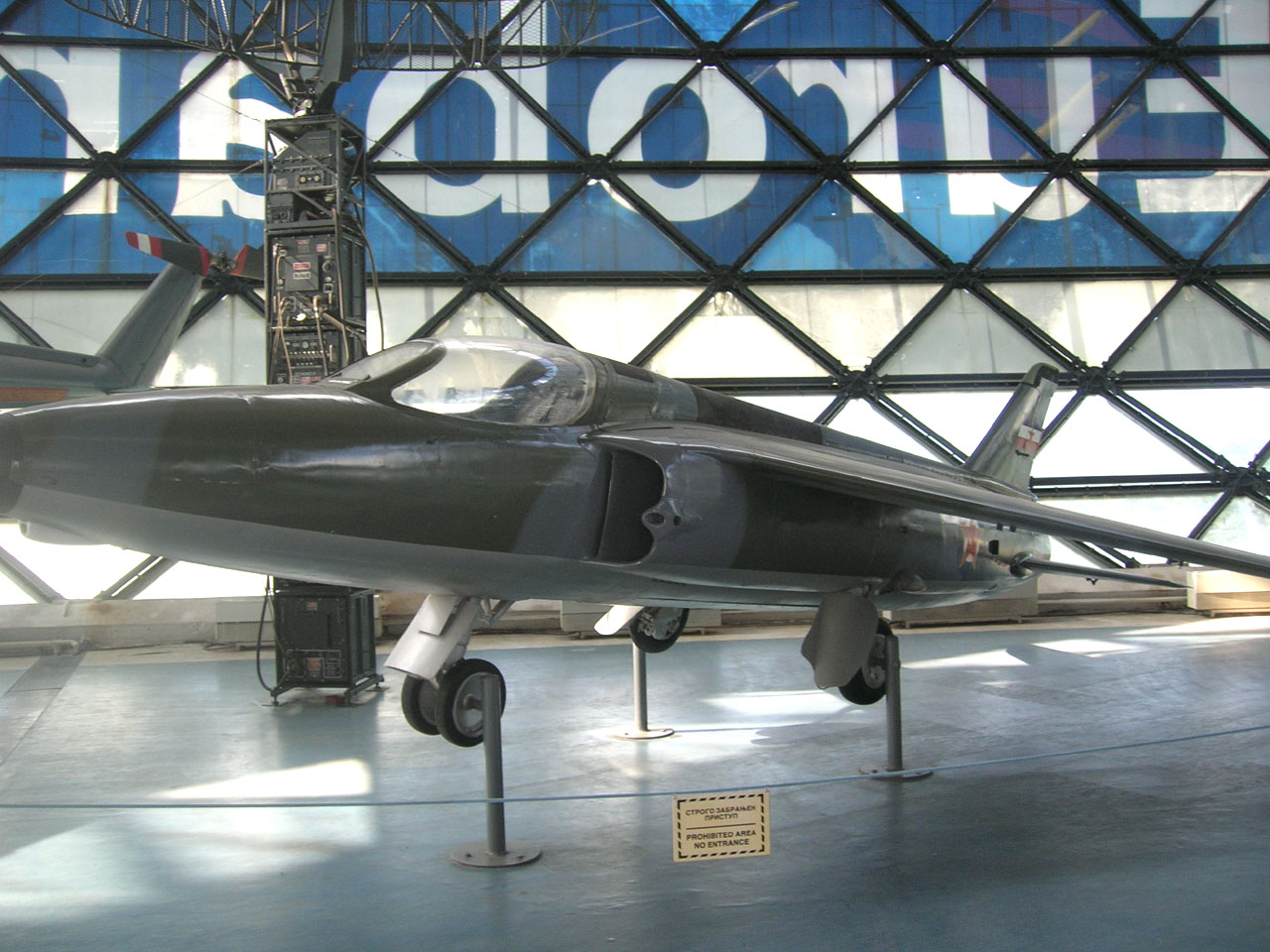
Folland Gnat with markings of SFR Yugoslav Air Force markings in Belgrade Aviation Museum.

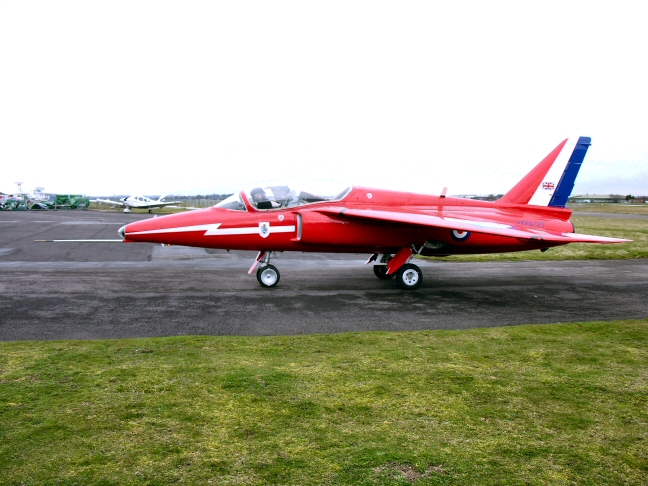
A former Red Arrows aircraft, XR537

Finland

- Finnish Air Force
  - Häme Wing
    - HävLLv 11
    - HävLLv 21

India

- Indian Air Force
  - No.2 Squadron
  - No.9 Squadron
  - No.15 Squadron
  - No.18 Squadron
  - No.21 Squadron
  - No.22 Squadron
  - No.23 Squadron
  - No.24 Squadron

United Kingdom

- Royal Aircraft Establishment operated one former Royal Air Force Gnat T.1 from Bedford for trials work.
- Royal Air Force
  - Central Flying School
    - Yellowjacks aerobatic team
  - 4 Flying Training School, RAF Valley
    - Red Arrows aerobatic team

== Accidents and incidents ==
- 31 July 1956 the prototype G-39-2 crashed at Stockbridge and was destroyed after structural failure caused by tailplane flutter. (Note: The Folland test pilot, Teddy Tennant, bailed out and descended safely, becoming first person to use the Folland/Saab ejection seat in action.)7
- 26 August 1958 Finnish Air Force GN-102 was destroyed near Tampere due to a technical design error in its hydraulic system. The pilot ejected.
- 15 October 1958 a development F.1 XK767 fatally crashed at Stapleford, Wiltshire following presumed control failure.
- 13 April 1966 RAF Gnat T.1 XP507 of 4FTS flew into the sea on approach to RAF Valley.
- 23 August 1967 RAF Gnat T.1 XP512 abandoned overhead RAF Valley at 3,000 feet (910 m) following seizure of Hobson Unit in tailplane during previous roller landing. Instructor seriously injured; student pilot uninjured. Aircraft flew on for about five minutes in large circle before crashing on Rhosneigr beach amongst bathers but inflicted no injuries on the public.
- 26 March 1969 RAF Gnat T.1 XR573 of the Red Arrows crashed into tree during formation display practice.
- 20 January 1971 RAF Gnat T.1s XR545 and XR986 of the Red Arrows collided and both crashed during practice display flying at RAF Kemble.
- 3 September 1975 RAF Gnat T.1 XS103 of the CFS collided with an Italian Air Force Lockheed F-104 Starfighter near Leck in Germany; both aircraft landed safely but due to damage the Gnat was written off.
- 28 October 1975 RAF Gnat T.1 XR571 of the 4 FTS RAF had a hard landing and declared a write off at RAF Valley, Anglesey.
- 30 April 1976 two RAF Gnat T.1s XP536 and XR983 of 4FTS collided and both crashed over North Wales.
- 30 June 1976 RAF Gnat T.1 XM707 of the Red Arrows was abandoned near RAF Kemble following loss of control of tailplane.
- 8 October 1976 RAF Gnat T.1 'XR996' of 4FTS crashed on approach at RAF Shawbury. Both crew killed.
- 10 January 1991 Shreveport, LA N3XR crashed, attributed to fuel starvation. 2 fatalities. NTSB Id: FTW91FA028
- 29 July 2013 Gnat T.1 XS105 (N18GT) crashed near Georgetown, SC, USA. The aircraft was destroyed.
- 1 August 2015, Gnat T.1 XP504 (though labelled XS111) of a Gnat display team crashed at the 'CarFest North' motoring festival at Oulton Park in Cheshire, during a display at the event; no ground injuries. Pilot Kevin Whyman died in the incident.

== Surviving aircraft ==
Several Gnats survive including some airworthy examples (particularly in the United States and the United Kingdom) and others on public display.

== Specifications (Gnat F.1) ==
Folland Gnat Mk.I 3-view drawings

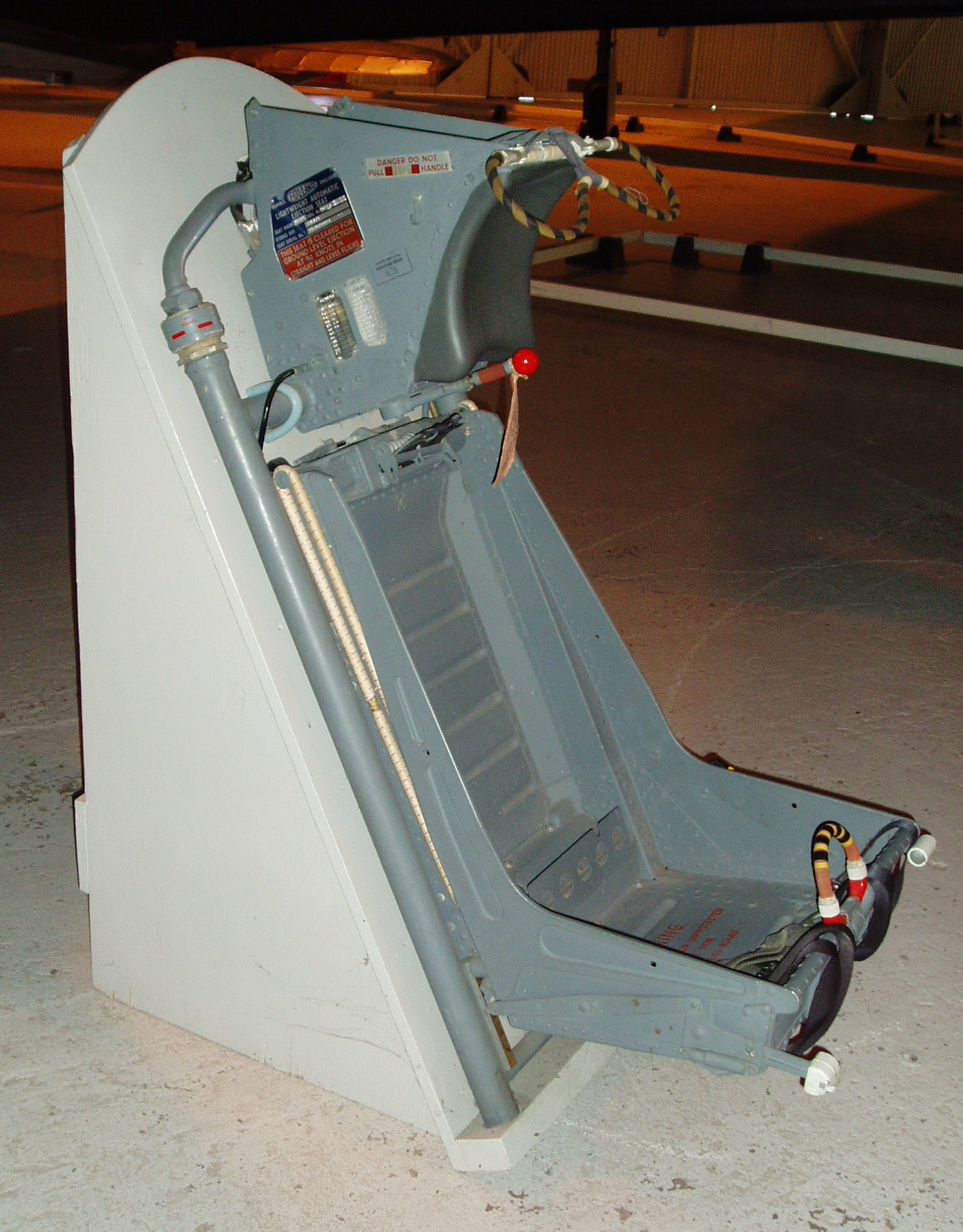
Folland Gnat ejection seat

Data from Jane's All the World's Aircraft 1958-59, The Great Book of Fighters

General characteristics

- Crew: 1
- Length: 29 ft 9 in (9.07 m)
- Wingspan: 22 ft 2 in (6.76 m)
- Height: 8 ft 10 in (2.69 m)
- Wing area: 136.6 sq ft (12.69 m^{2})
- Airfoil: RAE 102 modified
- Empty weight: 4,800 lb (2,177 kg)
- Gross weight: 6,575 lb (2,982 kg) interceptor

8,765 lb (3,976 kg) tactical, with external tanks and armament

- Max takeoff weight: 9,040 lb (4,100 kg)
- Fuel capacity: 175 imp gal (210 US gal; 800 L) in seven fuselage tanks + 25 imp gal (30 US gal; 110 L) in two optional rear fuselage tanks + two optional 66 imp gal (79 US gal; 300 L) jettisonable under-wing slipper tanks; Maximum fuel 332 imp gal (399 US gal; 1,510 L)
- Powerplant: 1 × Bristol Siddeley BOr.2 Orpheus 701-01 turbojet engine, 4,705 lbf (20.93 kN) thrust

Performance

- Maximum speed: 604 kn (695 mph, 1,119 km/h) at 20,000 ft (6,100 m)
- Maximum speed: Mach 0.98
- Range: 434.5 nmi (500.0 mi, 804.7 km)
- Endurance: 1 hour 10 minutes (normal)

2 hours 15 minutes (max fuel)

- Service ceiling: 50,000 ft (15,000 m) +
- Rate of climb: 20,000 ft/min (100 m/s)
- Time to altitude: 45,000 ft (14,000 m) 5 minutes
- Take-off distance to 50 ft (15 m): 2,190 ft (670 m) (interceptor)
- Take-off distance to 50 ft (15 m): 3,780 ft (1,150 m) (tactical)
- Landing distance from 50 ft (15 m): 2,200 ft (670 m)

Armament

- Guns: 2 × 30mm ADEN cannon with 115 rpg
- Rockets: 12 × 3 in (76 mm) rockets
- Bombs: 2 × 500 lb (227 kg) bombs

Avionics

- VHF radio
- Nav aids
- Gyro gunsight
- Ranging radar

== Notable appearances in media ==
Four privately owned Gnat T.1s together with an Ajeet portrayed the fictional carrier-based "Oscar EW-5894 Phallus" tactical fighter bombers flown by US Navy pilots in the 1991 comedy Hot Shots!.

== See also ==
- Red Arrows

Related development

- Folland Midge
- HAL Ajeet

Aircraft of comparable role, configuration, and era

- Aerfer Ariete
- Aerfer Sagittario 2
- Bréguet 1001 Taon
- Fiat G.91
- Helwan HA-300
- SNCASE Baroudeur

Related lists

- List of aircraft of the Royal Air Force
