= United Kingdom aircraft test serials =

Identification for U.K. aircraft

United Kingdom aircraft test serials are used to externally identify aircraft flown within the United Kingdom without a full Certificate of Airworthiness. They can be used for testing experimental and prototype aircraft or modifications, pre-delivery flights for foreign customers and are sometimes referred to as "B" class markings.

== 1930s ==
An initial set of markings was introduced in 1929, each company was allocated a letter to which would follow a number, sometimes with a hyphen or a gap between. For example, A was allocated to the Armstrong Whitworth Aircraft and A 1 was used in March 1930 on an Armstrong Whitworth Starling. Sometimes Hawker and Vickers would also add the letters PV to the markings to indicate a private venture (that is a type in development not paid for by the Air Ministry).

== 1940s ==
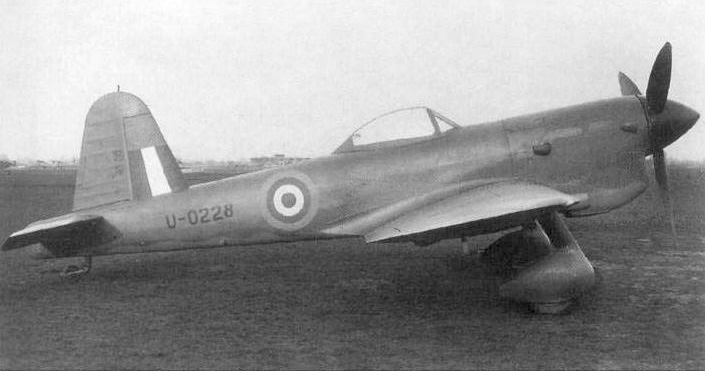
U-0228 a Miles M.20 showing the wartime presentation

The presentation was changed to look like a military serial for security reasons during the Second World War. For example, the prototype de Havilland Mosquito was allocated test markings E-0234.

== 1948 ==
Following a change back to the original system in 1946 a new system was introduced on 1 January 1948. Each company was allocated a number which followed the British nationality marking G and then followed by an individual identity number. For example, Blackburn Aeroplane & Motor Company were allocated G-2 and the first allocation G-2-1 was used on a Miles Messenger used as an engine testbed for the Cirrus Bombardier. Companies could allocate and re-use the identities as they liked, some ran in sequence from 1 and others used the aircraft manufacturers serial number as part of the marking, for example G-51-200 was a Britten Norman Islander with a manufacturers serial number of 200. Allocations of codes from defunct companies have been reallocated.

== Letter sequence 1929–1947 ==
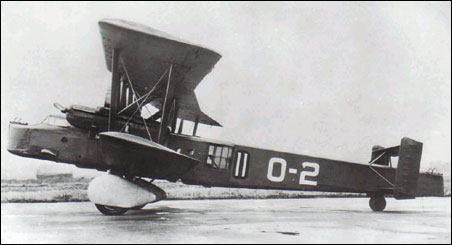
Vickers Type 163 marked as O-2

Allocation	Company	Notes
A	Armstrong Whitworth Aircraft	Replaced by G-1 in 1948
B	Blackburn Aeroplane & Motor Company	Replaced by G-2 in 1948
C	Boulton Paul	Replaced by G-3 in 1948
D	Portsmouth Aviation	Replaced by G-4 in 1948
E	de Havilland	Replaced by G-5 in 1948
F	Fairey Aviation	Replaced by G-6 in 1948
G	Gloster Aircraft	Replaced by G-7 in 1948
H	Handley Page	Replaced by G-8 in 1948
I	Hawker Aircraft	Replaced by G-9 in 1948
J	Parnall Aircraft	Out of use by 1946
J	Reid & Sigrist	From 1947, replaced by G-10 in 1948
K	Avro	Replaced by G-11 in 1948
L	Saunders-Roe	Replaced by G-12 in 1948
M	Short Brothers	Replaced by G-14 in 1948
N	Supermarine	Replaced by G-15 in 1948
O	Vickers Armstrongs	Replaced by G-16 in 1948
P	Westland Aircraft	Replaced by G-17 in 1948
R	Bristol Aeroplane	Replaced by G-18 in 1948
S	Spartan Aircraft	Out of use by 1936
S	Heston Aircraft	Replaced by G-19 in 1948
T	General Aircraft	Replaced by G-20 in 1948
U	Phillips & Powis later Miles Aircraft	Replaced by G-21 in 1948
V	Airspeed	Replaced by G-22 in 1948
W	G & J Weir	1933–1946
X	Percival Aircraft	Replaced by G-23 in 1948
Y	British Aircraft Manufacturing	Out of use by 1938
Y	Cunliffe-Owen	1940–1947, replaced by G-24 in 1948
Z	Auster Aircraft	Replaced by G-25 in 1948
AB	Slingsby Sailplanes	Replaced by G-26 in 1948

== Numeric sequence since 1948 ==
Allocation	Company	Notes
G-1	Armstrong Whitworth Aircraft later Hawker Siddeley Aviation	1948–1967
G-1	Rolls-Royce	Since 1969
G-2	Blackburn Aircraft later Hawker Siddeley Aviation	Used at Brough
G-3	Boulton Paul	
G-4	Portsmouth Aviation	1948–1949
G-4	Miles Aviation	Since 1969
G-5	de Havilland later Hawker Siddeley Aviation	Used at Hatfield then Chester
G-6	Fairey Aviation later Westland Helicopters	
G-7	Gloster Aircraft	1948–1961
G-7	Slingsby Sailplanes	Since 1971
G-8	Handley Page	1948-1970
G-9	Hawker Aircraft later Hawker Siddeley Aviation	Mainly used on Hawker Hunters and Hawker Sea Fury's
G-10	Reid & Sigrist	1948–1953
G-11	Avro later Hawker Siddeley Aviation	Used at Woodford
G-12	Saunders-Roe later Westland Aircraft then British Hovercraft Corporation	G-12-1 was used on the first practical hovercraft, the SR-N1; G-12-1 had been used previously on the Saro SR/A1
G-13	Not used	
G-14	Short Brothers	
G-15	Supermarine	1948–1968
G-16	Vickers-Armstrongs later British Aircraft Corporation	
G-17	Westland Aircraft later Westland Helicopters	
G-18	Bristol Aeroplane later British Aircraft Corporation	Used at Filton (Bristol) and Oldmixon (Weston-super-Mare)
G-19	Heston Aircraft	1948–1960
G-20	General Aircraft	1948–1949
G-21	Miles Aircraft later Handley Page Reading	1948–1963
G-22	Airspeed	1948–1952
G-23	Percival Aircraft later British Aircraft Corporation	1948–1966
G-24	Cunliffe-Owen Aircraft	1948–1949
G-25	Auster Aircraft	1948–1962
G-26	Slingsby Sailplanes	1948–1949
G-27	English Electric later British Aircraft Corporation	
G-28	British European Airways later British Airways Helicopters	
G-29	D. Napier & Son	1948–1962
G-30	Pest Control Limited	1952–1957
G-31	Scottish Aviation	
G-32	Cierva Autogiro Company	1948–1951
G-33	Flight Refuelling Limited	1948–1972
G-34	Chrislea Aircraft	1948–1952
G-35	F.G Miles then Beagle Aircraft	1951–1970
G-36	College of Aeronautics then Cranfield Institute of Technology	Since 1954
G-37	Rolls-Royce	Used at Hucknall 1954–1971
G-38	de Havilland Propellers later Hawker Siddeley Dynamics	1954–1975
G-39	Folland Aircraft	1954–1965; G-39-1 was used on the prototype Folland Midge
G-40	Wiltshire School of Flying	
G-41	Aviation Traders	1956–1976
G-42	Armstrong Siddeley Motors	1956–1959
G-43	Edgar Percival Aircraft	1956–1959
G-44	Agricultural Aviation Limited	1959
G-45	Bristol Siddeley Engines	1959–1969
G-46	Saunders-Roe later Westland Aircraft	1959–1962
G-47	Lancashire Aircraft	
G-48	Westland Aircraft later Westland Helicopters	1960–1969
G-49	F G Miles Engineering	1965–1969
G-50	Alvis	
G-51	Britten Norman	Since 1967
G-52	Marshall of Cambridge	
G-53	NDN Aircraft	
G-54	Cameron Balloons	
G-55	W Vinten	
G-56	Edgley Aircraft	
G-57	Airship Industries	
G-65	Solar Wings	
G-76	Police Aviation Services Limited	
G-77	Thruster Air Services Ltd	
G-78	Bristow Helicopters Limited	
G-79	Eurocopter Oxford	
G-80	British Microlight Aircraft Association Ltd	
G-89	Cosmik Aviation Limited	

== See also ==
- British military aircraft designation systems
- List of RAF squadron codes
- Royal Air Force roundels
- United Kingdom aircraft registration
- United Kingdom military aircraft registration mark
