= Sydney Camm =

British aeronautical engineer

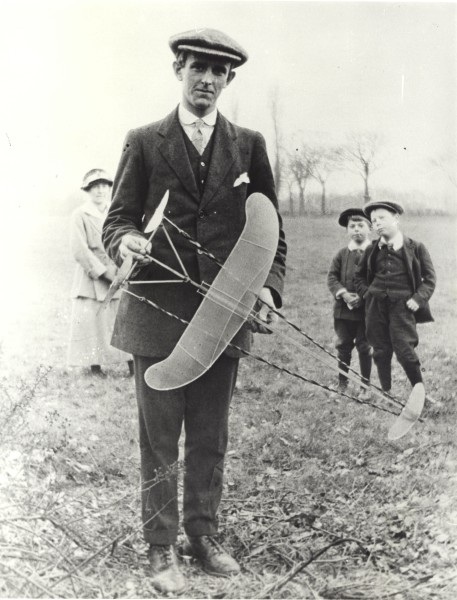
- Sydney Camm at Windsor Model Aeroplane Club, c. 1915 with "twin-pusher" style free flight model
- Born: 5 August 1893; Windsor, Berkshire, England
- Died: 12 March 1966 (aged 72); Richmond, London, England
- Resting place: Long Ditton Cemetery, Long Ditton, Surrey, England
- Education: Royal Free School, Windsor
- Spouse: Hilda Rose Starnes
- Children: 1 daughter
- Parent(s): Frederick Camm, Mary Smith
- Engineering career
- Discipline: Aeronautics
- Institutions: RAeS
- Employer: Hawker Siddeley
- Significant design: Hawker Hurricane, Hawker Hunter
- Significant advance: Hawker Siddeley P.1127
- Awards: Knight Bachelor (1953); British Gold Medal for Aeronautics (1949); RAeS Gold Medal (1958); Daniel Guggenheim Medal (1965); International Air & Space Hall of Fame (1984)

Sir Sydney Camm, CBE, FRAeS (5 August 1893 – 12 March 1966) was an English aeronautical engineer who contributed to many Hawker aircraft designs, from the biplanes of the 1920s to jet fighters. One particularly notable aircraft he designed was the Hawker Hurricane fighter.

== Early years ==
Sydney Camm was born at 10 Alma Road in Windsor, Berkshire, the eldest child of the twelve children of Frederick Camm, a carpenter/joiner and Mary Smith. The Camm family lived near Windsor & Eton Central railway station. His brother Frederick James Camm became a technical author, and created the Practical Wireless magazine.

In 1901 he began attending the Royal Free School on Bachelors Acre in Windsor (The Royal Free school became the Royal Free Middle School with the secondary school becoming the Princess Margaret Royal Free School on Bourne Avenue). In 1906 he was granted a Foundation Scholarship. In 1908 Camm left school to become an apprentice carpenter.

Camm developed an interest in aeronautics. Camm and his brothers began building model aircraft which they supplied to Herbert's Eton High Street shop. After finding that they could obtain a higher price they began making direct sales to boys at Eton College, which were delivered in secret to avoid attracting the attention of Herbert and the school authorities.

These activities led him to being one of the founders of the Windsor Model Aeroplane Club in early 1912. His accomplishments as a model aeroplane builder culminated in a man-carrying glider which he and others at the club built in 1912.

== Aviation career ==
Shortly before the start of World War I Camm obtained a position as a shop-floor carpenter at the Martinsyde aircraft company which was located at the Brooklands racing circuit in Weybridge, Surrey. His ability soon led to his being promoted to the drawing office, where he spent the war period. In 1919 his handbook Aeroplane construction was published. After the company went into liquidation in 1921, Camm was employed by George Handasyde, who had created his own aircraft manufacturing company, which was responsible for the creation of the Handasyde Monoplane.

In November 1923 Camm joined the Hawker Aircraft Company (later Hawker Siddeley) based at Canbury Park Road in Kingston upon Thames as a senior draughtsman. His first design was the Cygnet, the success of which led to his being appointed chief designer in 1925.

In 1925, in association with Fred Sigrist, Hawker's managing director, Camm developed a form of metal construction that used jointed tubes as a cheaper and simpler alternative to welded structures.

During his employment at Hawker he was responsible for the creation of 52 different types of aircraft, of which a total of 26,000 were manufactured. Among his early designs were the Tomtit, Hornbill, Nimrod, Hart and Fury. At one time in the 1930s 84 per cent of the aircraft in the RAF were designed by Camm.

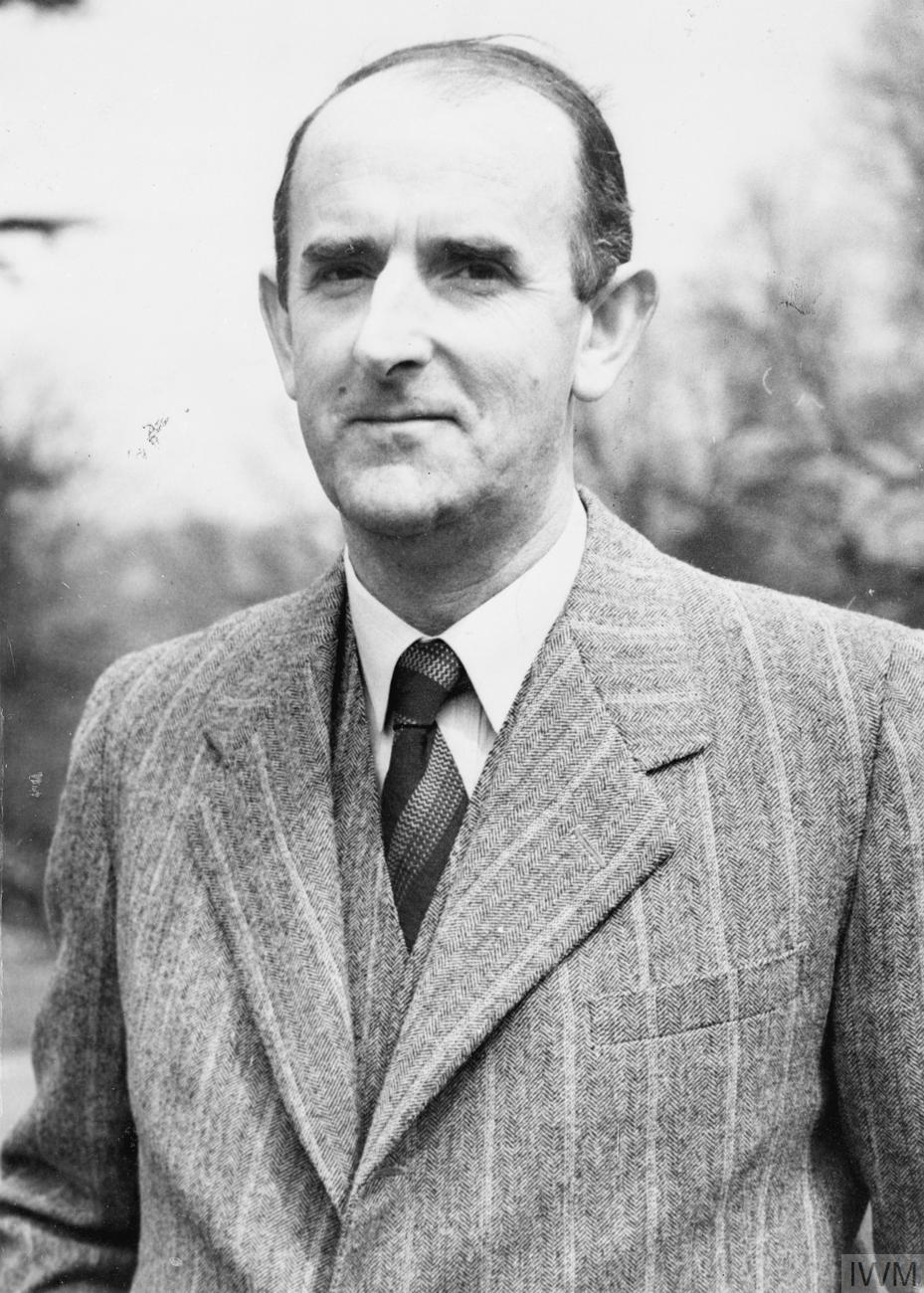
Camm during World War II

He then moved on to designing aeroplanes that would become mainstays of the RAF in the Second World War including the Hawker Hurricane, Hawker Typhoon and Hawker Tempest.

"Camm had a one-tracked mind – his aircraft were right, and everybody had to work on them to get them right. If they did not, then there was hell. He was a very difficult man to work for, but you could not have a better aeronautical engineer to work under. [...] With regard to his own staff, he did not suffer fools gladly, and at times many of us appeared to be fools. One rarely got into trouble for doing something either in the ideas line, or in the manufacturing line, but woe betide those who did nothing, or who put forward an indeterminate solution."

Among the engineers who worked with Camm at Hawker were Sir Frederick Page (later to design the English Electric Lightning), Leslie Appleton (later to design the advanced Fairey Delta 2 and Britain's first air-to-air missile, the Fairey Fireflash), Stuart Davies (joined Avro in 1936 and later to be chief designer of the Avro Vulcan), Roy Chaplin (became chief designer at Hawker in 1957) and Sir Robert Lickley (chief project engineer during the war, and later to be chief engineer at Fairey).

=== Hurricane ===
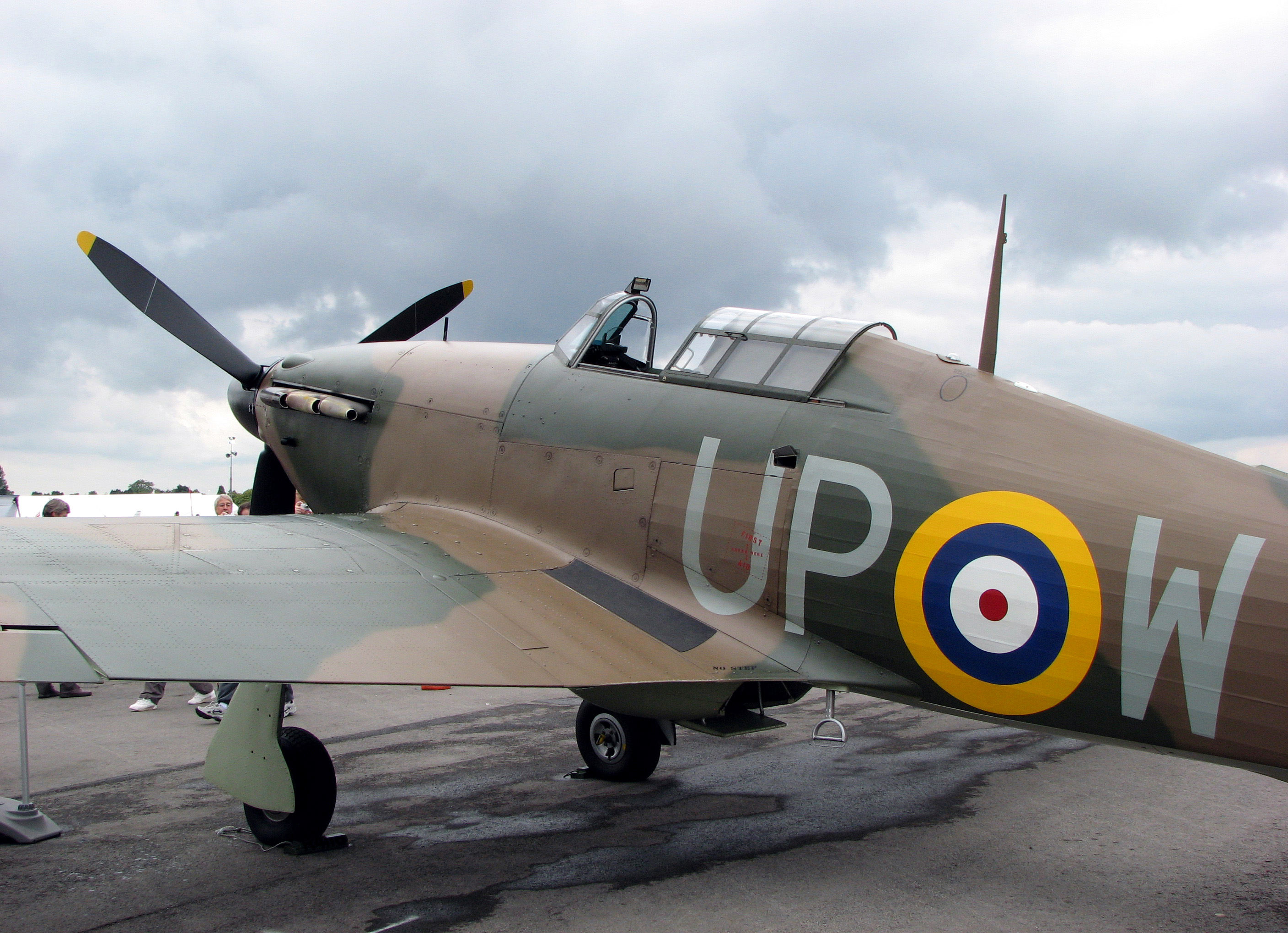
The Hawker Hurricane was designed by Sir Sydney Camm.

With the Hurricane, Sydney Camm moved from the technology of the biplane to contemporary monoplane fighter aircraft. The result was that fighters flew faster, and with the improved engine technology of the time, higher, and could be made more deadly than ever.

In 1936, the Hawker engineer Frank Murdoch was responsible for getting the Hurricane into production in sufficient numbers before the outbreak of the war, after an eye-opening visit to the MAN diesel plant in Augsburg.

=== Typhoon ===
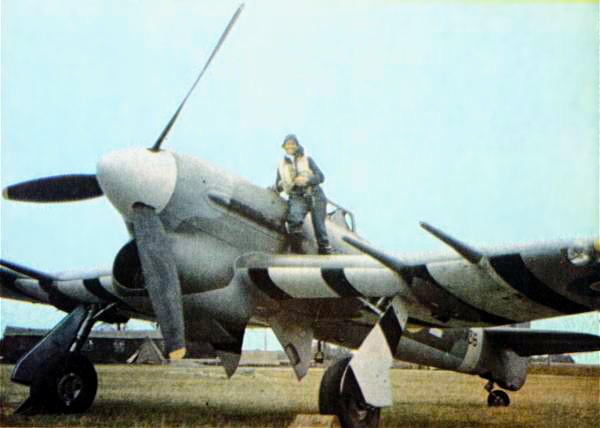
Hawker Typhoon

When the Typhoon's design first emerged and entered squadron service, pilots became aware that there was elevator flutter and buffeting at high speeds, due to the positioning of the heavy Napier Sabre engine intake very close to the wing root.

The engineering of the aircraft to travel at higher speeds and handle compressibility effects was one of the challenges of the day, but with his small design team of one hundred members at Hawker, Camm managed to solve these problems and make the Typhoon an effective combat weapon even at these speeds. As operational requirements changed, the Typhoon was used more as a fighter-bomber, in which role its low level performance, weapon-carrying capabilities and ability to absorb damage made it very effective. It was much used in the Battle of the Falaise Pocket, in which ground-attack aircraft proved very destructive. German losses were so severe that most of France was retaken less than two weeks after the conclusion of this operation.

=== Tempest ===
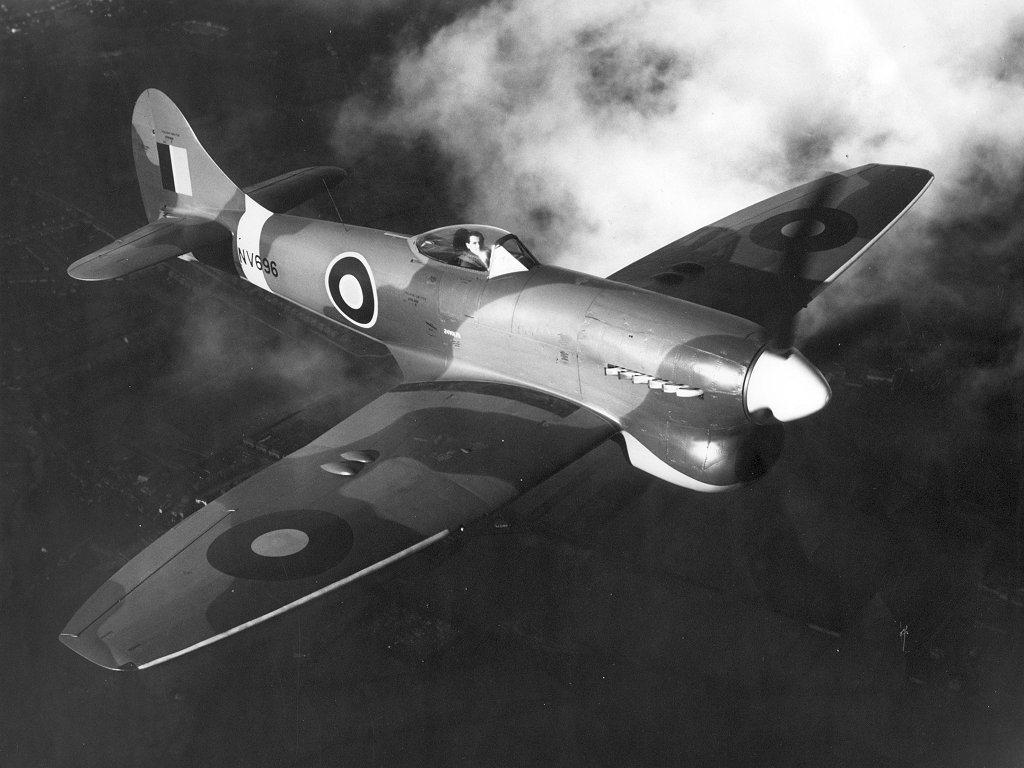
Hawker Tempest prototype

The lessons learned from the Hawker Typhoon were incorporated into its successor, the Hawker Tempest. As soon as the Typhoon entered service, the Air Ministry requested a new design. Camm recommended that they keep the existing design of the Typhoon for the most part, with modifications to the aerofoil. He also considered the new and powerful Napier Sabre and Bristol Centaurus engines as the powerplant. Camm decided that both engines would be used: the Tempest Mk 5 was fitted with the Napier Sabre, while the Tempest Mk 2 had the Bristol Centaurus. The design modifications to be made to the aircraft to switch from one engine type to another were minimal, so that little assistance was needed in ferrying these aircraft all the way to India and Pakistan, in the final days of the conflict.

=== Sea Fury ===
This was a higher performance development of the Tempest with a reduced wing area, a Centaurus engine, and a considerably improved view for the pilot. Named the Fury, only the carrier-based Hawker Sea Fury went into service, serving with the Royal Navy from 1947 to 1955.

== Post-war work ==
After the Second World War, Camm created many jet-powered designs which would become important aircraft in the Cold War era.

=== Harrier ===
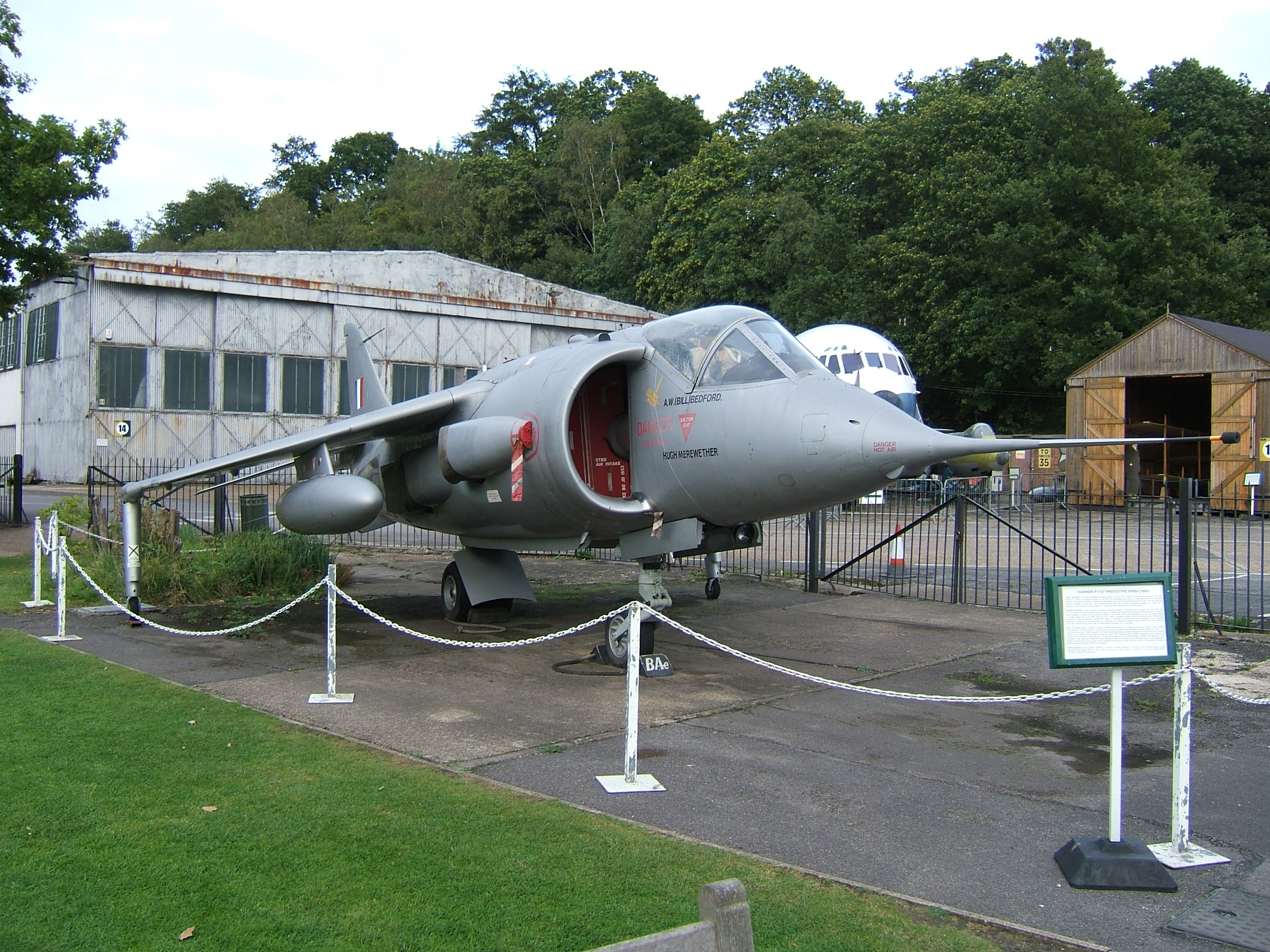
Hawker P.1127

Notable among Camm's post-war work is his contribution to the design of the Hawker Siddeley P.1127 / Kestrel FGA.1, the progenitor of the Hawker Siddeley Harrier. The Harrier is a well-known vertical takeoff and landing (VTOL) aircraft designed at Hawker Siddeley, which would later merge into British Aerospace, now known as BAE Systems. The Harrier was one of the radical aircraft which took shape in postwar Britain, which required the bringing together of many important technologies, such as vectored thrust engines like the Bristol Siddeley (later Rolls-Royce) Pegasus and technologies like the Reaction Control System. Camm played a major role in determining these and other vital Harrier systems. In 1953, Camm was knighted for these and other achievements and his contribution to British Aviation. The P.1127 first flew on 21 October 1960. Working with Camm on this aircraft and the Hunter was Professor John Fozard, who became head of the Hawker design office in 1961 and would write a biography of Camm in 1991.

=== Hunter ===
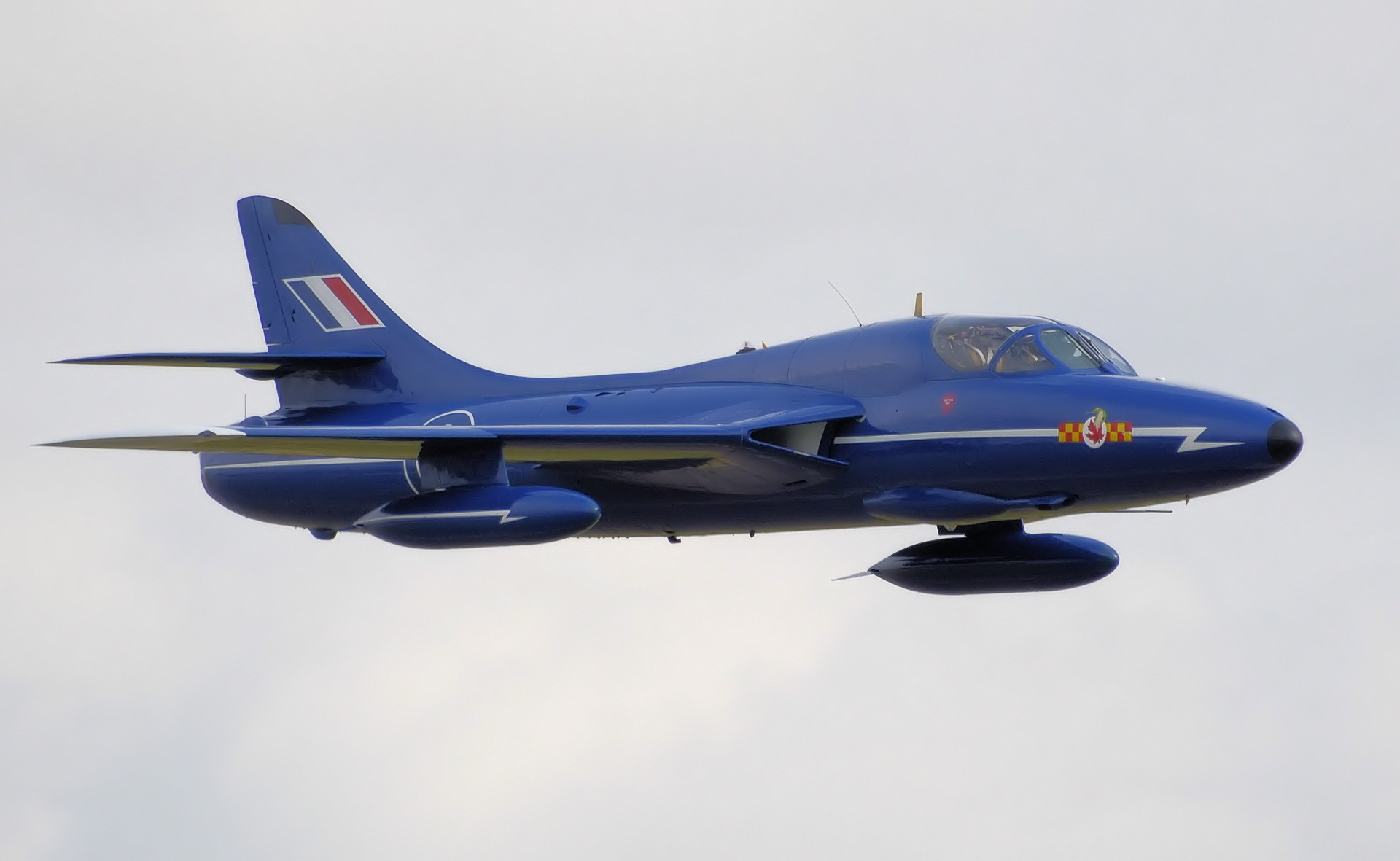
The Hunter, designed by Sydney Camm, made its first flight in 1951. This privately owned Hawker Hunter T.7 "Blue Diamond" is seen at speed during an air display in 2007.

Camm worked on many aircraft built by Hawker before the Harrier, including what is probably his most significant aircraft after the Second World War, the Hawker Hunter.

== Final years ==
Sydney Camm was knighted 2 June 1953, on the occasion of the coronation of Queen Elizabeth II.

Camm was President of the Royal Aeronautical Society (RAeS) from 1954 to 1955. Since 1971 the RAeS has held the biennial Sir Sydney Camm Lecture in June, given by the current commander-in-chief of RAF Air Command.

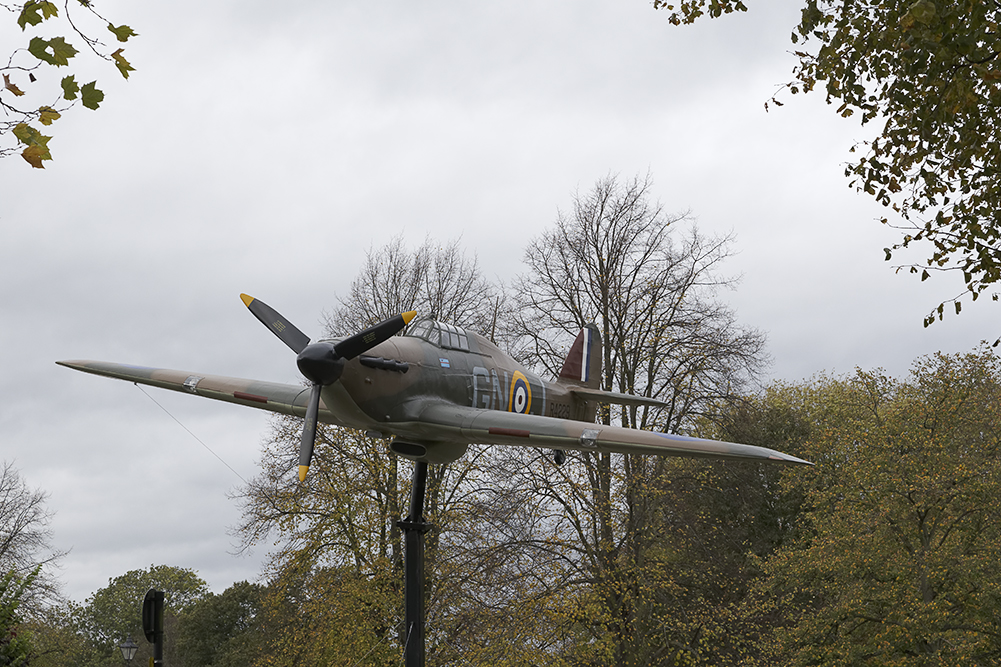
Full-size replica Hurricane tribute to Camm at his boyhood home at Windsor

Camm retired as chief designer at Hawker in 1965 and was succeeded by Ralph Hooper. He, however, remained on the board of its successor, Hawker Siddeley until his death.

Before he died, Camm was planning the design of an aircraft to travel at Mach 4, having begun his life in aircraft design with the building of a man-carrying glider in 1912, just nine years after the first powered flight.

In 1966, Camm was awarded the Guggenheim Gold Medal, which had to be presented posthumously.

== Death ==
Camm died in his 73rd year on 12 March 1966 whilst playing golf at the Richmond Golf Club.

== Personal life ==
Camm lived at Thames Ditton in Surrey. He married Hilda Starnes in 1915 and they had a daughter in 1922.

== Tributes ==
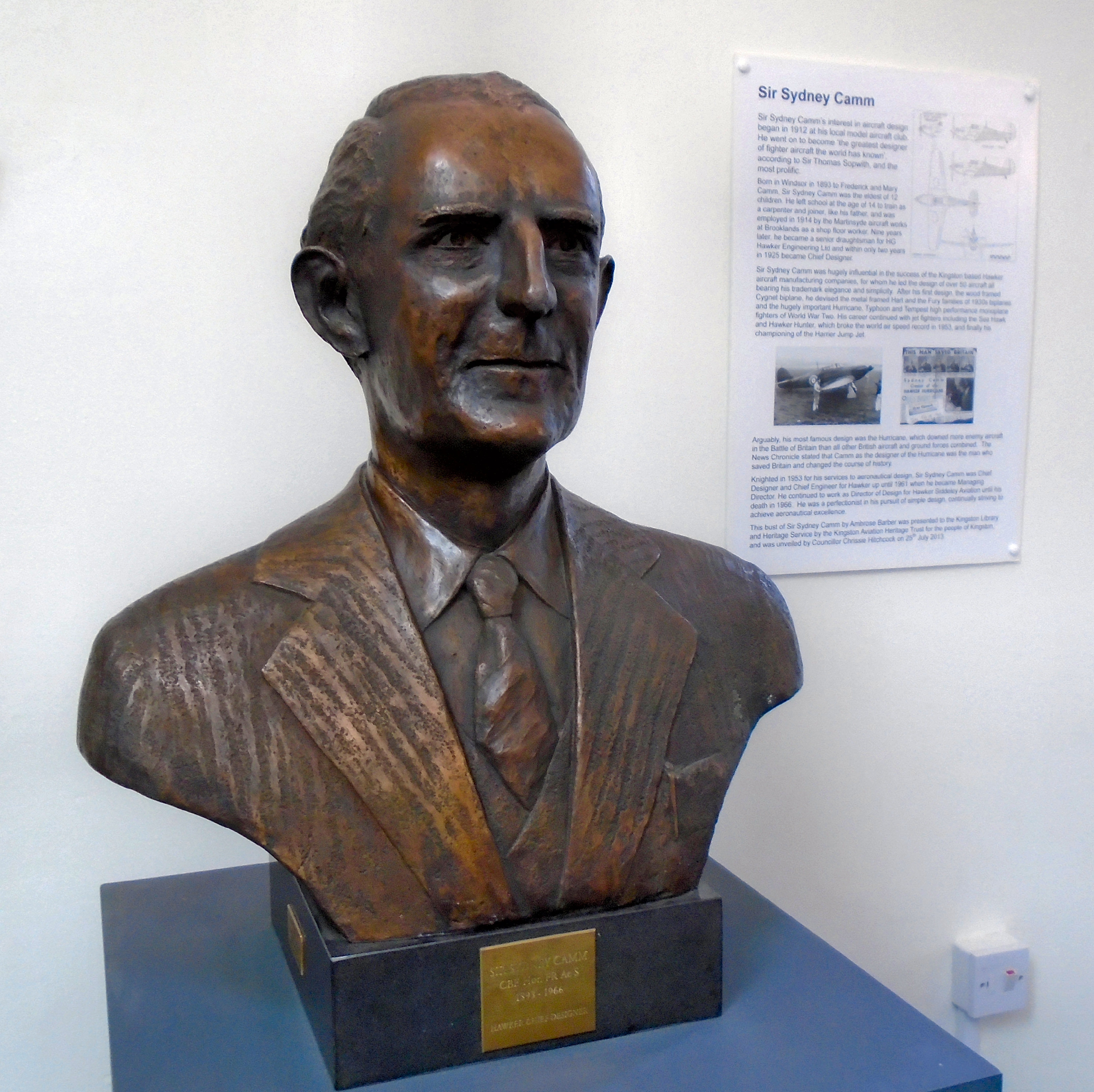
Bust of Sydney Camm in Kingston upon Thames Library, London

'Camm Gardens' road in Kingston-upon-Thames was named after Sydney Camm, with a memorial in situ to his memory of a World War 2 propeller engine hub.

In 2012 a full size replica of a Hawker Hurricane was erected near Alexandra Gardens, in Camm's home town of Windsor, near to his childhood home.

In 1984, Camm was inducted into the International Air & Space Hall of Fame at the San Diego Air & Space Museum.

A bronze bust by Ambrose Barber was placed in Kingston Library (2014).

== See also ==
- Hawker Siddeley
