= Roy Ewans =

British engineer (1917–2012)

John Roy Ewans FRAeS (21 December 1917 – 22 January 2012) was a British aerodynamicist, and the former chief designer of the Manchester-based aircraft company Avro.

== Early life ==
He was born in Torquay. He attended Imperial College London, gaining a First-Class degree in Mechanical Engineering in 1938. He then did a postgraduate diploma in Aeronautical Engineering.

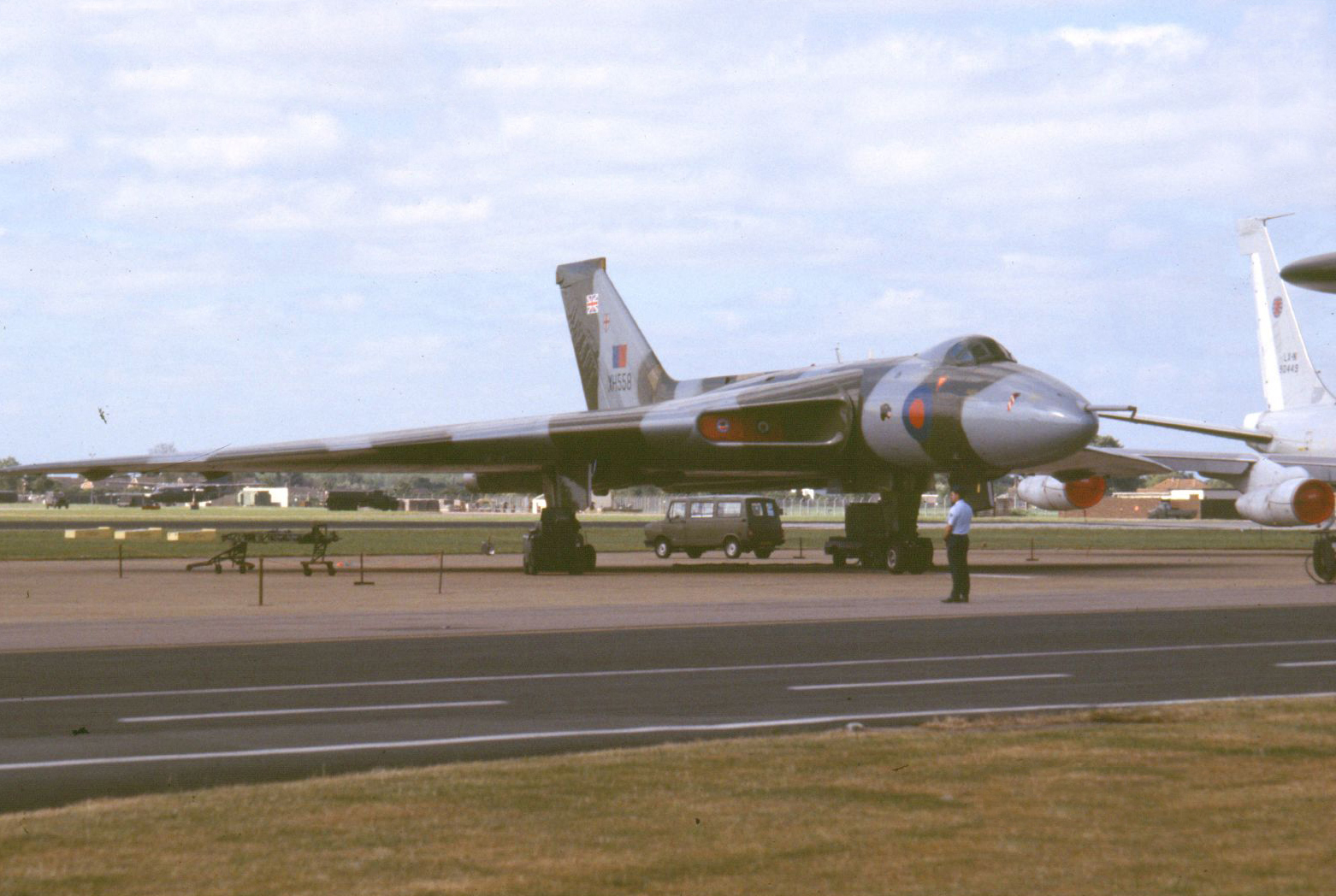
Vulcan in 1989

== Career ==
=== Operation Surgeon ===
After WWII, he was attached to the Sixth United States Army Group to search for German aeronautical scientists.

=== Avro ===
He joined Avro in Manchester (Chadderton) in 1949. In October 1949 he became the Chief Aerodynamicist. In May 1955 he became deputy Chief Designer. In July 1955 he became the Chief Designer, designing the Avro Vulcan B2.

Whilst at Avro, he was responsible for the design of the Avro 748, now known as the Hawker Siddeley HS 748, of which over 400 were built.

In the early 1960s at Avro, he was working on the proposed Avro 761 airliner, a development of the proposed Avro 771 airliner; neither were built.

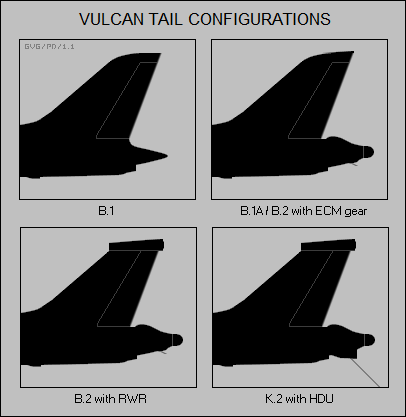
Tail configurations of the Vulcan

=== BAC ===
He joined BAC in June 1961, staying at Weybridge (former Vickers) in Surrey until 1967.

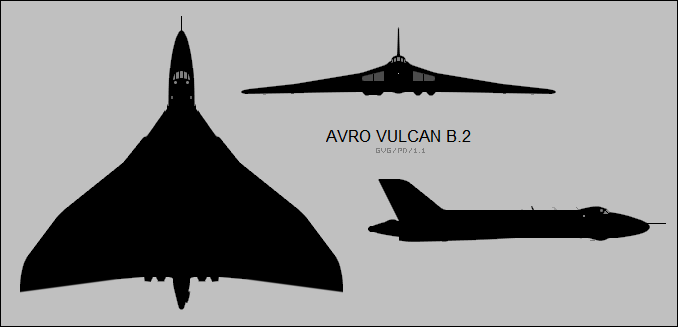
Avro Vulcan B2

== Personal life ==
He married Enid Frayn, a mathematician, and they had three sons and a daughter, with seven grandchildren. He became a Fellow of the Royal Aeronautical Society in 1957.

He retired in 1982 and moved to St Mawes in southern Cornwall, on the coast. He enjoyed sailing and owning yachts. In 1999 he had a stroke. His wife died in 2005. He died in 2012 aged 94.

Business positions
Preceded by Stuart Davies	Chief Designer of A.V. Roe and Company; July 1955 – May 1961	Succeeded by Company subsumed into Hawker Siddeley
