= Barry Laight =

British aerospace engineer (1920–2012)

Barry Pemberton Laight (12 July 1920 – 6 October 2012) was a British aerospace engineer, known for his design of the Spey-engined Buccaneer, one of the last all-British military aircraft, which left RAF service in March 1994.

== Early life ==
He was the son of Donald Laight and Nora Pemberton, and was born in Liverpool. His father was a mechanic in the Royal Flying Corps.

In the 1930s he attended the Johnston School in the City of Durham, a grammar school. He later went to Birmingham Central Technical College (later Aston University), and the Merchant Venturer's Technical College in Bristol. In July 1937 he was awarded a scholarship from the Society of British Aerospace Constructors. He would later gain an MSc from the University of Bristol.

== Career ==
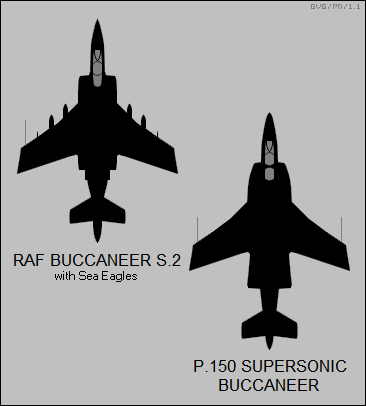
The S.2 Buccaneer and the proposed P.150 Supersonic Buccaneer

=== Hawker Siddeley ===
He became Chief Engineer at the Hawker division of Hawker Siddeley (Advanced Projects Group) in 1963, and Director for Military Projects of HSA in 1968. At Hawker Siddeley he worked with Ralph Hooper on development of the Harrier for the RAF, and the development of the Hawk for the RAF too. He worked on the proposed Hawker Siddeley P.1154, which was cancelled in February 1965.

== Personal life ==
He married Ruth Murton in 1951. They had a son and daughter. He became a member of Mensa in 1945. He was given the Silver Medal of the RAeS in 1963. He became a Fellow of the Royal Academy of Engineering in 1981.

He lived in West Ella near Hull before retiring to Esher.

Professional and academic associations
Preceded by	President of the Royal Aeronautical Society; 1974-75	Succeeded by Air Marshal Sir Charles Pringle
Business positions
Preceded by James C. Floyd	Chief Engineer of Hawker Siddeley Aircraft; 1963-1968	Succeeded by Ralph Hooper
