= Hawker Siddeley HS.141 =

1970s British airliner design study

HS.141
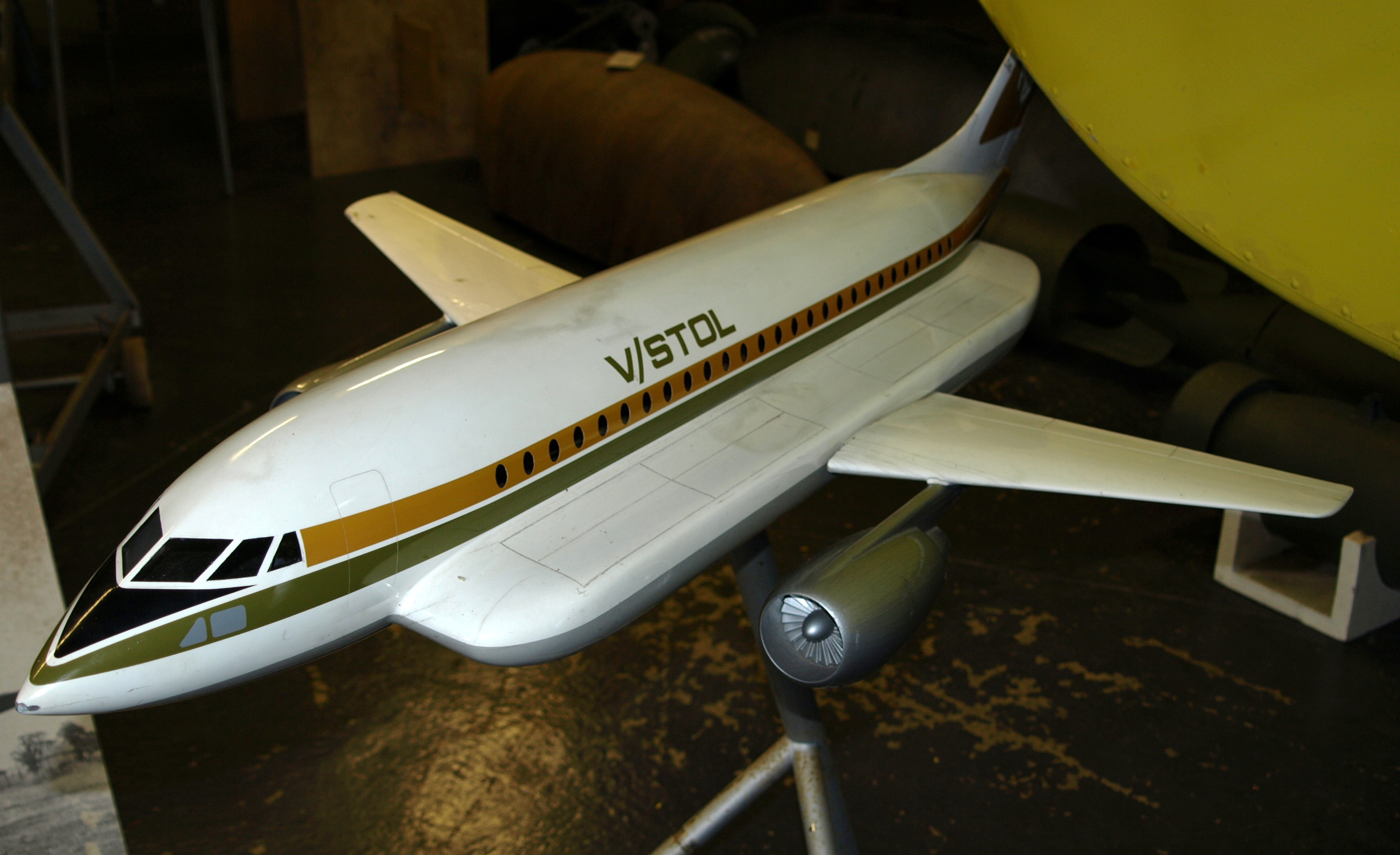
- HS.141 promotional model in company livery.

General information
- Type: V/STOL airliner
- Manufacturer: Hawker Siddeley
- Number built: None

History
- Introduction date: Intended 1978-9
- First flight: Not flown

The Hawker Siddeley HS.141 was a 1970s design study and submission for a British V/STOL airliner requirement. Designed by Hawker Siddeley Aviation and tested in wind tunnels neither prototypes nor production aircraft were produced.

== Design and development ==
=== Outline Requirement ===
In 1969 the British Transport Aircraft Requirements Committee (TARC) issued a design study "Outline Requirement" (OR) for a 100-seat VTOL airliner capable of a range of 450 miles (725 km). Emphasis was to be on noise reduction by using steep approach and departure profiles, much like those used today at London City Airport. It was thought at the time that money would be better invested on designing new aircraft types than building a third London airport.

Hawker Siddeley investigated various configurations of aircraft, powerplant and control systems including an early proposal using ogival delta wings and twin fins, before submitting their draft design proposal to the TARC in January 1970. At the March 1970 German Aviation Show in Hanover, the first official details were released of the newly named HS.141 project.

=== Design ===
The HS.141 design was a jet airliner of all-metal construction with a T-tail and a low-mounted swept wing with a quarter-chord sweepback of 28 degrees. The design featured two wing-mounted "cruise" engines and 16 lift jet engines mounted in sponsons either side of the fuselage (eight per side). The engines under main consideration were the Rolls-Royce RB.220 turbofan for forward propulsion and the Rolls-Royce RB.202, a high bypass ratio lift turbofan engine using technology developed for the Rolls-Royce RB.162 lift jet. Both engines were themselves design studies by Rolls-Royce and it was feared that there would be delays in their development due to the company's problems at the time. One new engine type also considered for main propulsion was the 'SNECMA M.56', which became the CFM International CFM56. Variations using fewer lift jet engines for STOL operations only were also studied as it was realised that the engines could account for 15% of the total weight of the aircraft and 35% of the final cost.

During the design stage many solutions involving high-lift devices were explored including flaps blown by the "cruise" engines. The flight control system proved the greatest challenge to the design team, systems had to be devised to control the aircraft in slow or hovering flight. This was to be achieved by swivelling the lift engines in their mounts combined with varying the thrust of each engine to provide control in pitch, roll and yaw. The lift engines were said to be a useful safety feature in the event of failure of the main 'cruise' engines. Significant design information was gained from flight trials with the Dornier Do 31 aircraft being developed at the same time in Germany.

The passenger cabin was conventional with five or six seats abreast, luggage and freight was to be loaded in pre-packed pallets and raised up into the lower fuselage using a system similar to the Douglas DC-8.

Extensive wind tunnel testing with 1/10 scale models was carried out.

== Intended flight operations ==
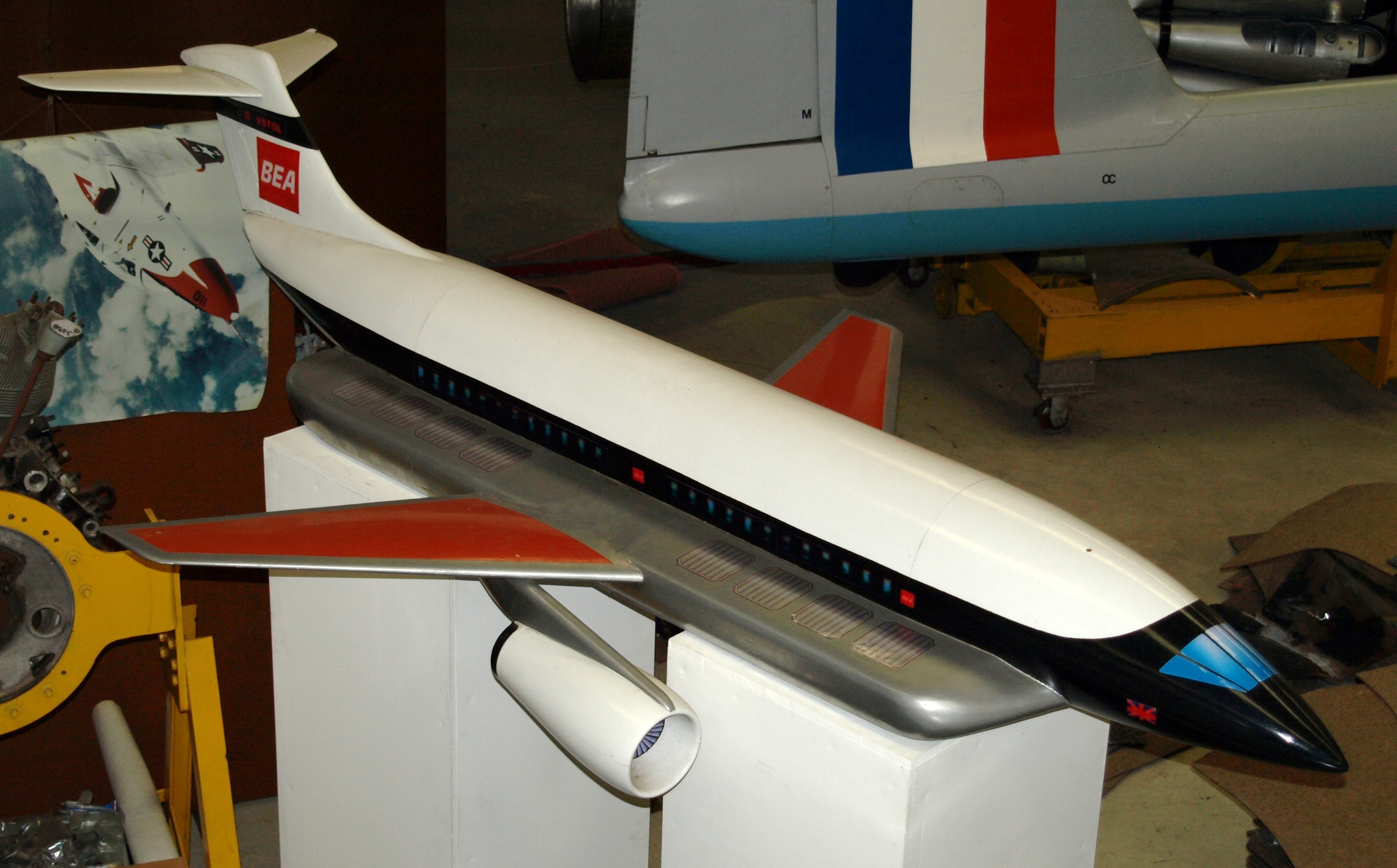
Promotional model of the HS.141 in British European Airways livery

A conventional take-off and landing flight profile was shown to cover a "noise footprint" of 20 square miles (50 km^{2}) in line with an airport's runway when using a limit of 90 decibels, by using an approach path of six degrees (double the normal angle) and a climb out path of 15 degrees the footprint could be reduced to 3 square miles (8 km^{2}). This form of STOL operation was expected to be in place at British city airports by the late 1970s. To reduce the noise footprint further to a circle with a diameter of just 3,000 ft VTOL operations were expected to commence in the early 1980s.

The suggested minimum noise take-off technique for the HS.141 was to use full power from the lift engines in a vertical climb to 250 ft (76 m) then reducing power to 83% to continue this climb to 1,000 ft (300 m). At this height the aircraft would transition into forward flight using vectored thrust from the lift engines and then accelerate and climb to 2,000 ft (600 m) using increasing thrust from the cruise engines. By this stage the aircraft would have reached an airspeed of 168 knots (310 km/h) and would be fully supported by its wings alone, the lift engines being shut down and covered by hinged doors.

For an approach to a vertical landing the procedure was to be virtually reversed with the approach commencing at 2,000 ft (600 m) and 4 miles (6.4 km) from the landing point.

== Cancellation ==
Despite the work and funds that Hawker Siddeley had expended, the lack of enthusiasm for civil VTOL operations combined with the cancellation of the lift engine’s development doomed the project.

== Variants ==
HS.141 "datum aeroplane"
Basic variant. 102–119 passengers dependent on seat pitch. To have used 16 RB.202 lift fans.
HS.141 "stretched"
Fuselage increased in length to 135 ft 2 in (41.2 m) to accommodate up to 150 passengers. To have used 20 RB.202 lift fans.

== Specifications (HS.141 'datum aeroplane' as designed) ==
Data from Air Enthusiast, 1971.

General characteristics

- Capacity: 102-119 passengers
- Length: 120 ft 2 in (36.63 m)
- Wingspan: 75 ft 0 in (22.86 m)
- Height: 29 ft 10 in (9.09 m)
- Wing area: 1,060 sq ft (98 m^{2})
- Empty weight: 110,300 lb (50,031 kg)
- Max takeoff weight: 134,200 lb (60,872 kg)
- Powerplant: 2 × Rolls-Royce RB.220 turbofan engines, 27,000 lbf (120 kN) thrust each
- Powerplant: 16 × Rolls-Royce RB.202 lift-jet turbofan engines, 10,300 lbf (46 kN) thrust each

Performance

- Maximum speed: Mach 0.92
- Cruise speed: 375 kn (432 mph, 694 km/h) / Mach 0.85
- Range: 1,043 nmi (1,200 mi, 1,932 km)

== See also ==
Aircraft of comparable role, configuration, and era

- Armstrong Whitworth AW.681
- Dornier Do 31

Related lists

- List of civil aircraft
- List of VTOL aircraft
