= Stuart Davies (engineer) =

British aerospace engineer

- Born: 5 December 1906
- Died: 22 January 1995 (aged 88)
- Education: Northampton Polytechnic, London
- Spouse: Ethel Radcliffe
- Children: 1 daughter, Susan Rosalie Mary Davies
- Engineering career
- Discipline: Aeronautics
- Institutions: RAeS
- Employer: Avro
- Significant design: Avro Vulcan
- Significant advance: Avro Lancaster
- Awards: Gold Medal, RAeS (1958)

Stuart Duncan Davies CBE FREng FRAeS (5 December 1906 – 22 January 1995) was a British aerospace engineer who was in charge of the design of the Avro Vulcan. He was also responsible for converting the unsuccessful two-engined Avro Manchester into the four-engined Avro Lancaster.

== Early life ==
He was the son of William Davies and Alice Duncan. He attended Westminster City grammar school in central London from 1918 to 1923.

== Career ==
=== Vauxhall ===
His career began at Vauxhall Motors where he worked for two years from the age of 16.

=== Vickers ===
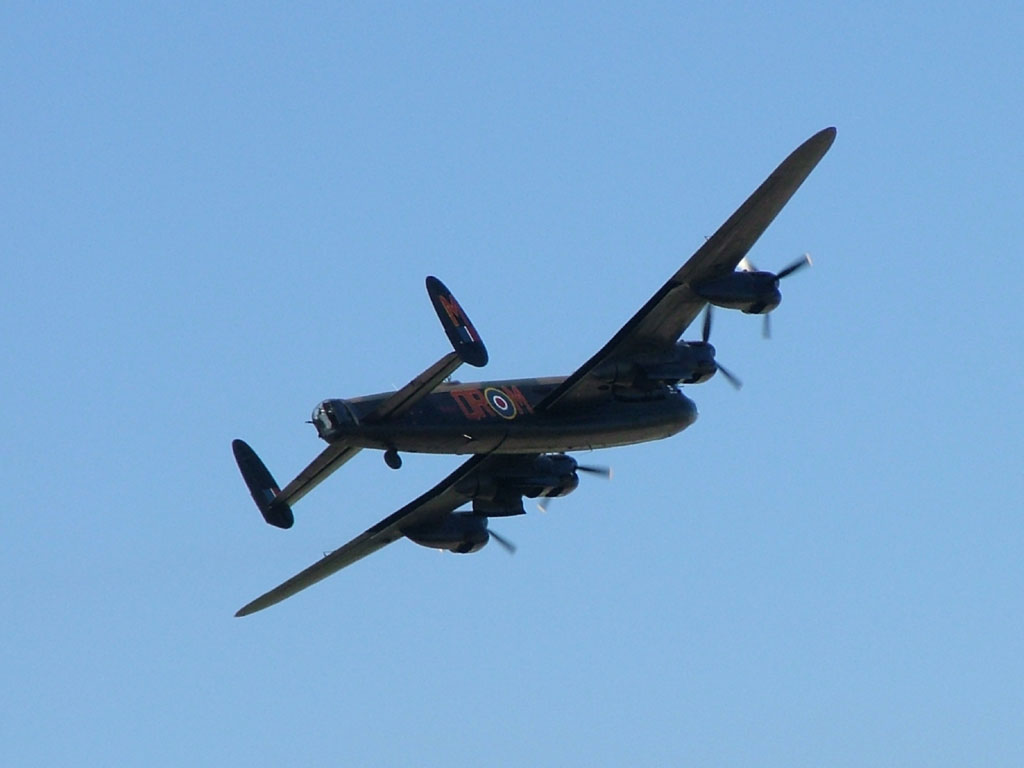
Avro Lancaster

He worked at Vickers as a junior technical assistant from 1925 and gained an external BSc degree in Engineering at Northampton Polytechnic (now City University London) awarded by the University of London. At Vickers he worked in the wind tunnel at Brooklands, and on the Virginia biplane bomber, converting it from a wooden to metal structure.

=== Hawker ===
In 1931 he moved to Hawker Aircraft at Kingston upon Thames. He worked in the stress office, in a team of seven. There he worked on the Hart and Fury biplanes; the RAF's main fighter planes in the 1930s. In 1933 he began work on what would become the Hawker Hurricane, then known as the Fury Monoplane.

In April 1936 he was named as chief designer of a spin-off company called Aeronautical Corporation of Great Britain Ltd, which was liquidated around October 1937.

=== Avro ===
Hawker Siddeley was formed in 1935, and in the group it included A.V.Roe & Company of Manchester. In January 1938 he moved to Avro, becoming assistant to the chief designer. Aged 33, he was promoted to be the company's experimental manager in April 1940. In 1940 he became responsible for converting the Manchester into the Lancaster. 7,377 Lancasters would be built in the UK and Canada, having first flown at Woodford on 8 January 1941.

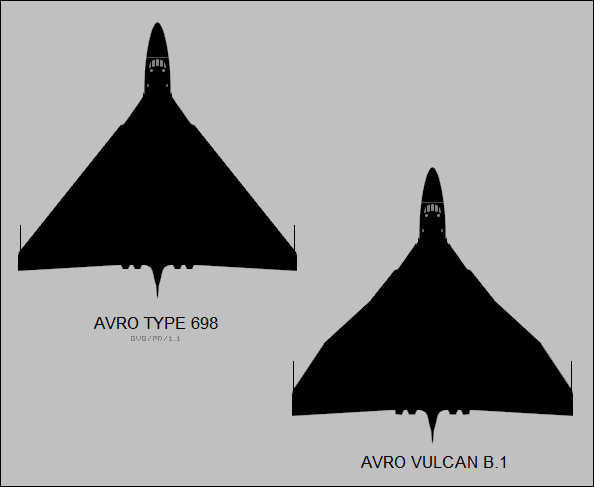
Change in shape of the Vulcan's wing

From 1944 he was in charge of the Avro York transport plane, and later worked on the Avro Lincoln.

He took off at 11.58am on Saturday 23 August 1947 in Avro Tudor G-AGSU, and as the aircraft lifted, the aircraft banked and the starboard wing tip touched the ground, and crashed. He lived at Bridle Road in Woodford. The other survivor of the crash was Edward Talbot, the flight engineer, of Wayside Drive in Poynton. The funeral was at Woodford church on Wednesday 27 August 1947, attended by Davies, Sir Alliott Verdon Roe, Sir Geoffrey de Havilland, and Sir Frank Spriggs. Roy Chadwick died of a fractured skull and pelvis, with instantaneous death, and the other two drowned; but doctors visiting the scene believed that these other two would have survived otherwise.

In 1947 he became the technical director at Avro, with responsibility for producing the Avro Vulcan (Avro 698), which first flew on 30 August 1952. He was Chief Designer from 1945 to 1955, and was succeeded by Roy Ewans.

He also designed the Avro Athena advanced single-engined trainer. The Avro 707B first flew from Dunsfold in August 1951. Five Avro 707 aircraft were produced before the Vulcan. They were used for experimental work on the delta wing.

In mid-September 1953, the fourth Anglo-American aeronautical conference took place, over three days, where twelve technical papers were to be read and discussed. He was to read a technical paper on delta aircraft, but this was withdrawn for security reasons. George S. Schairer, the main designer of the Boeing B-52 Stratofortress, gave a talk on engines, as did William Clegern of Convair. In October 1953, he attended a meeting of British aircraft designers in Canada.

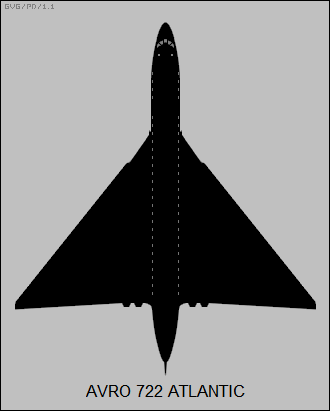
Proposed Avro Atlantic airliner: perhaps Concorde started life here

The Avro Atlantic was an early-1950s proposed 94-seat airliner version of the Vulcan, with delta wings and Olympus engines, which was never built.

=== Later career ===
Left Avro at the end of June 1955, largely as he preferred the south of England. He joined Dowty in November 1955, later becoming technical director of for Dowty Rotol, in June 1966. becoming managing director of Dowty Fuel Systems in Cheltenham, and returned to Hawker Siddeley Aviation from August 1958 to 1964, as technical director.

In May 1958, he was awarded the British Gold Medal of the RAeS, for the Vulcan. The British Silver Medal was awarded to the axial-flow jet engine designer William Henry Lindsey (Pat Lindsey, 19 November 1911 - 8 May 2000) and William Frederick Saxton (1908 - 1980) of Armstrong Siddeley Motors.

In September 1959, the government wanted Hawker Siddeley and Bristol Aeroplane Company to 'work together' on Concorde. Bristol Siddeley had been formed in April 1958, with Armstrong Siddeley of Hawker Siddeley Aviation, and built the Concorde engines. When Folland was taken over in November 1959 by Hawker Siddeley Aviation, he became the technical director of Folland.

In April 1961, as technical director of Hawker Siddeley Aviation, he instigated cooperation with the University of Southampton, and its Institute of Sound and Vibration Research, into research into noise and vibration, under Prof Elfyn John Richards (28 December 1914 - 7 September 1995).

He left aviation for general engineering. He was President from 1971–2 of the Royal Aeronautical Society. In 1958 he received the RAeS Gold Medal. He became an FEng in 1977. He was an honorary Fellow of the RAeS.

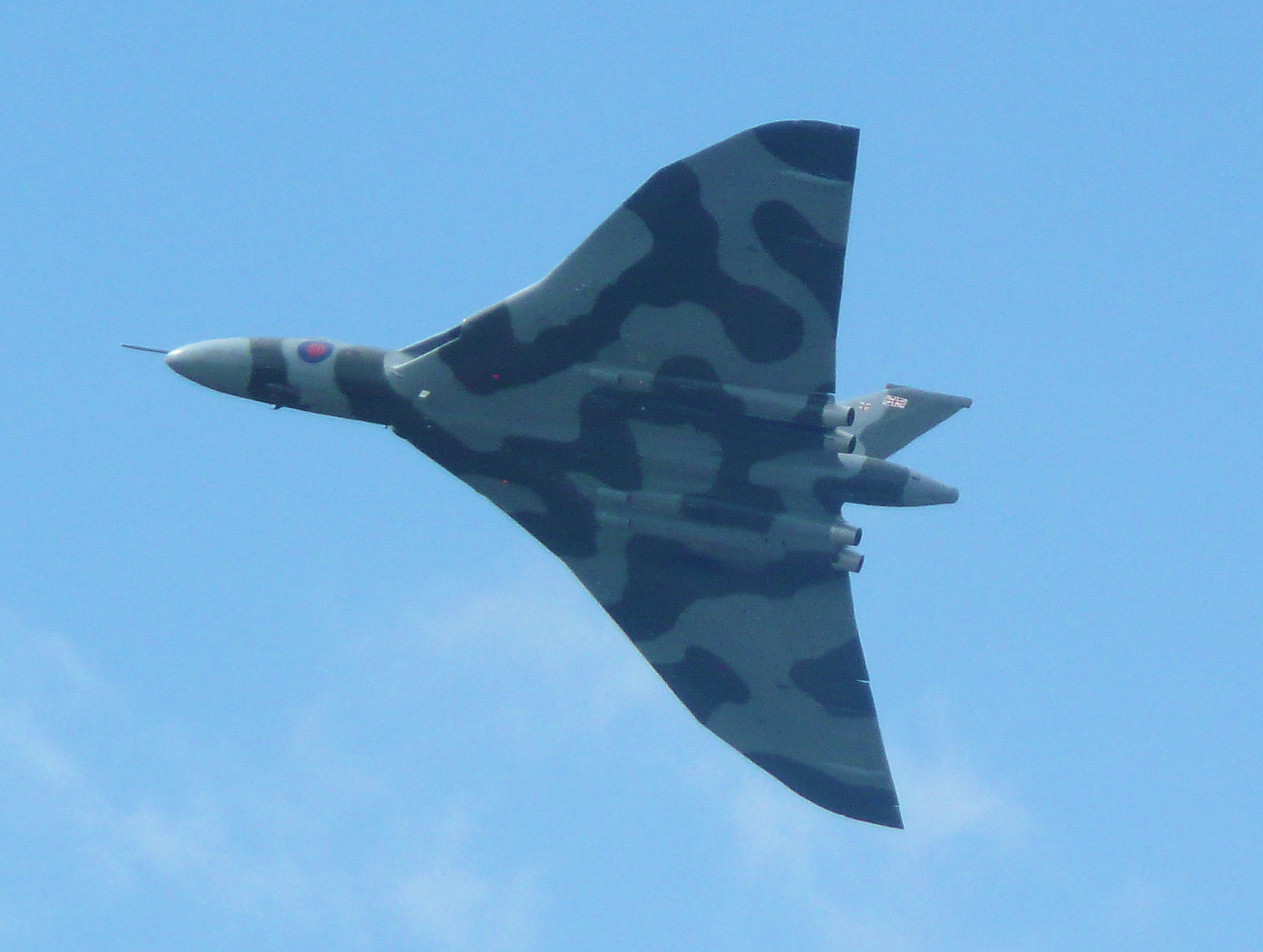
Avro Vulcan

== Personal life ==
In 1935 he married Ethel Radcliffe. She died before him. They had one daughter in 1939, born in north-east Cheshire. He was awarded the CBE in the 1968 Birthday Honours.

He died on 22 January 1995 aged 88.

== See also ==
- Sir Roy Dobson, managing director of Avro in the 1950s.
- James C. Floyd
- John Fozard, designer of the Harrier
- George S. Schairer, designer of the Boeing B-52 Stratofortress
- Reginald Stafford, designer of the Handley Page Victor

Professional and academic associations
Preceded by Francis Rodwell Banks	President of the Royal Aeronautical Society; 1971–72	Succeeded by John Richard Morgan
Business positions
Preceded by	Technical Director of Dowty Rotol -1974	Succeeded by
Preceded by	Technical Director of Hawker Siddeley Aviation; 1959–64	Succeeded by
Preceded by	Chief Designer of A.V. Roe and Company; 1945–55	Succeeded by Roy Ewans
