= Thomas Kerr (engineer) =

British aerospace engineer

Thomas Henry Kerr CB (18 June 1924 – 9 September 2004) was a British aerospace engineer. He served as a Royal Air Force pilot during World War II. He later served as the director of the Royal Aircraft Establishment and director of research and development at Royal Ordnance. He was president of the Royal Aeronautical Society from 1985 to 1986.

== Early life ==
Kerr was born on 18 June 1924 in Nottingham, England, to Albert Edward Kerr and his wife Francis Jane Kerr (née Simpson). His father had served in World War I as an air observer. He was educated at Magnus Grammar School, Newark-on-Trent. In 1941, the school formed an Air Training Corps squadron which he immediately joined.

Having served as a pilot during World War II, he was demobilised in 1946. He then joined Durham University, where he studied physics. He graduated in 1949 with a first class Bachelor of Science (BSc) degree.

=== Military service ===
Having attended the Durham University short course, Kerr joined the Royal Air Force Volunteer Reserve in 1942. He trained as a pilot and later served as a flying instructor. Having held the rank of aircraftman 2nd class, he was commissioned as a pilot officer on probation on 27 May 1944. On 27 November 1944, his commission was confirmed and he was promoted to war substantive flying officer. He was promoted to war substantive flight lieutenant on 27 May 1946. With the end of World War II, the Royal Air Force Volunteer Reserve was reconstituted and he retained his commission with the rank of flight lieutenant dated to 1 January 1948. He relinquished his commission on 1 January 1953.

== Career ==
In September 1949, Kerr joined the Royal Aircraft Establishment. As part of its Aero Flight, he researched into factors affecting the spinning of aircraft.

Professional and academic associations
| Unknown | President of the Royal Aeronautical Society; 1985–1986 | Succeeded by John Fozard |
