= Ralph Hooper =

English aeronautical engineer (1926–2022)

- Born: 30 January 1926; Hornchurch, Essex, England
- Died: 12 December 2022 (aged 96); Richmond, London, England
- Engineering career
- Discipline: Aeronautics
- Institutions: RAeS
- Employer: Hawker Siddeley
- Significant design: Hawker Siddeley Harrier
- Significant advance: Hawker Siddeley P.1127
- Awards: Mullard Award (1983, with John Fozard)

Ralph Spenser Hooper, OBE, FREng, FRAeS (30 January 1926 – 12 December 2022) was an English aeronautical engineer, recognised mostly for his work on the Hawker Siddeley Harrier, specifically in relation to the marriage between the Pegasus engine and the layout of the aircraft, allowing it to safely hover with margins of stability.

== Early life ==
Hooper was born in Hornchurch, then in Essex. He was the son of Marjorie Spenser and Herbert Hooper. He is a distant relative of the poet Edmund Spenser. He went to Hymers College in Hull. Due to the Hull Blitz he was evacuated to Pocklington Grammar School for one and a half terms. His sister was Sheila Spenser Hooper. He became an apprentice at Blackburn Aircraft Company when aged 15 in January 1942, then went to University College Hull (became the University of Hull in 1954), gaining a Diploma in Aeronautics. He was one of the first students to join the Cranfield College of Aeronautics in 1946 and graduated with a Diploma in Aircraft Design in 1948. He joined Hawker Aircraft in 1948.

== Career ==
Hooper was sometimes referred to, with Sir Stanley Hooker and Sir Sydney Camm, as being one of the three people who created the Harrier aircraft. Unlike them, he was not knighted. He was awarded the Royal Aeronautical Society's Gold Medal in 1986 for his work on the Harrier and Hawk. He received the OBE in June 1978.

Hooper was succeeded as Chief Designer of the Harrier in 1965 by (later Professor) John Fozard, who continued in this post until 1978. Fozard became Chief Designer of the supersonic VTOL P1154 from October 1963.

Hooper later became Deputy Technical Director of British Aerospace at Kingston upon Thames (the base of Hawker) in Surrey. In 2019 he was awarded the Distinguished Alumnus Award by Cranfield University.

=== Harrier ===
Working from 1957 with the designer of the Bristol Siddeley Pegasus engine, Gordon Lewis, they came to an arrangement of engine and aircraft design, resulting in the initial designs of the Hawker Siddeley P.1127. The Pegasus design was initially designated as the BE.53, when the final four-nozzle layout was not arrived at. The Bristol Siddeley Orpheus had been the starting point for the engine, with the Orpheus 3 first used, then an Orpheus 6. The Harrier project, unlike most modern British military aircraft, had not been developed in response to a Government requirement but was Hawker's own unsupported project, and from 1959 was the only aircraft that Hawker was working on. It was also produced at a time when many concurrent aircraft projects, from Government requirements, would be drastically cancelled. The Pegasus engine development was financially supported by a department of NATO.

The first design had an engine that only vectored the thrust from the engine's fan (cool air) - this was only 50% of the engine's total thrust. Vectoring from the high-temperature engine exhaust was not originally contemplated, or thought possible. However he realised that the hot exhaust gases could be bifurcated, as demonstrated on the earlier Hawker Sea Hawk, to provide enough thrust for vertical take off, the fundamental layout of the Harrier.

By March 1958 he had finally arrived at (what would become) the design of the Harrier, with its distinctive anhedral wing design and undercarriage with wing-tip outriggers. The undercarriage design was much disliked by Sir Sydney Camm. Detailed design of the wing began in August 1958. In March 1959, the Government issued the General Operational Requirement (GOR) 345 for a vertical take off aircraft, in response its knowledge of the design work of the P.1127. This was followed in May 1959 by the Government specification ER 204D.

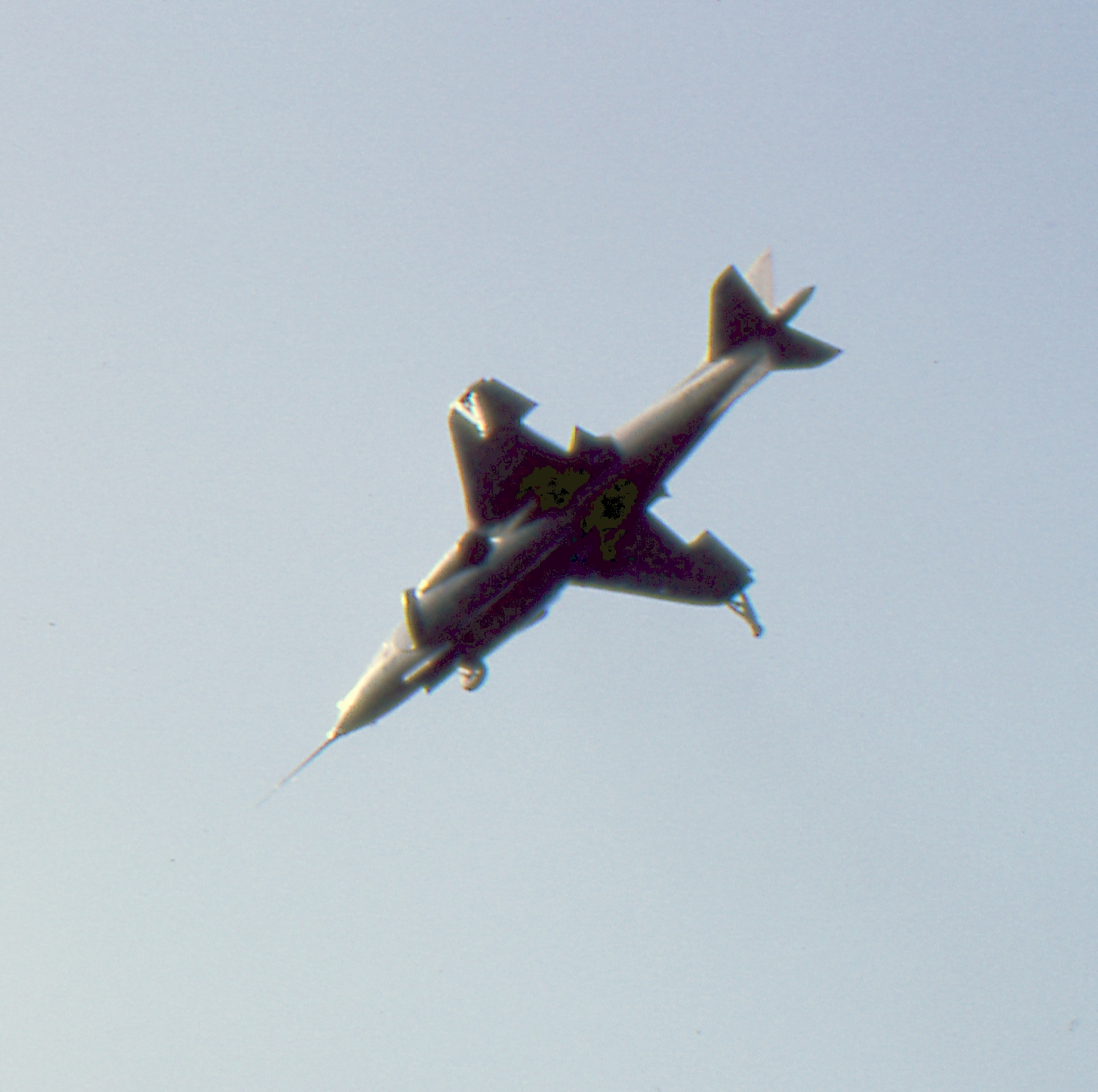
P.1127 flying in September 1962

In early 1960, work at NASA's Ames Research Center had demonstrated that transition from vertical to conventional flight would be possible. On 22 June 1960, the project finally received a contract and finance from the Ministry of Aviation. XP831 (now at the Royal Air Force Museum London) first flew (tethered) on 21 October 1960 with a Pegasus 2 engine at Hawker's Dunsfold Aerodrome flown by Bill Bedford. Untethered flight first took place on 19 November 1960. The first conventional flight took place on 13 March 1961 from RAE Bedford, and it was there on 12 September 1961 that the first full transition from vertical to conventional flight took place, surprisingly with little incident. The first crash took place (XP836) on 14 December 1961 with the pilot successfully ejecting. Anhedral tailplanes were introduced in 1962.

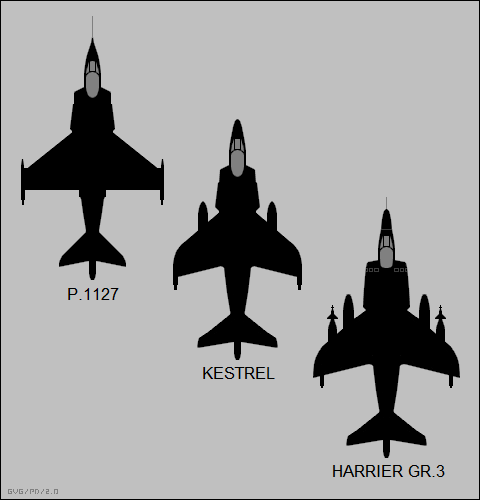
Evolution of the Harrier's wing

In 1964, the prototypes were improved with a more swept wing and a more powerful Pegasus 5 engine, and in November 1964 it was designated as the Hawker Siddeley Kestrel, and was trialled by pilots from the RAF, the German Luftwaffe and the US Air Force at RAF West Raynham until November 1965. It was funded by these other two air forces as well. Hawker had become Hawker Siddeley in 1963.

The Kestrel was only meant to be a development aircraft for the later P.1154, but was what became the Harrier. The RAF was not pleased about this change of events. The Kestrel was developed under Air Staff Requirement 384. The resulting aircraft had a Pegasus 6 engine, with a new design of air intakes, and redesigned wings to improve longitudinal stability. In December 1966, 60 aircraft were ordered by the Government, and by 1967 had been christened as the Harrier.

=== P.1154 ===
In 1962 he won the NATO NBMR-3 (NATO Basic Military Requirement) International Design Competition for his work on the proposed supersonic version of the Harrier, the Hawker Siddeley P.1154. This was cancelled by the new Labour government in February 1965, when the aircraft was in the process of advanced assembly. It was originally to be called the Harrier, and would have had Plenum Chamber Burning in the front nozzles to increase the thrust of the BS.100 engine. Although originally for use by Royal Navy and RAF squadrons, in 1963 it was decided the Royal Navy would use the McDonnell Aircraft Phantom.

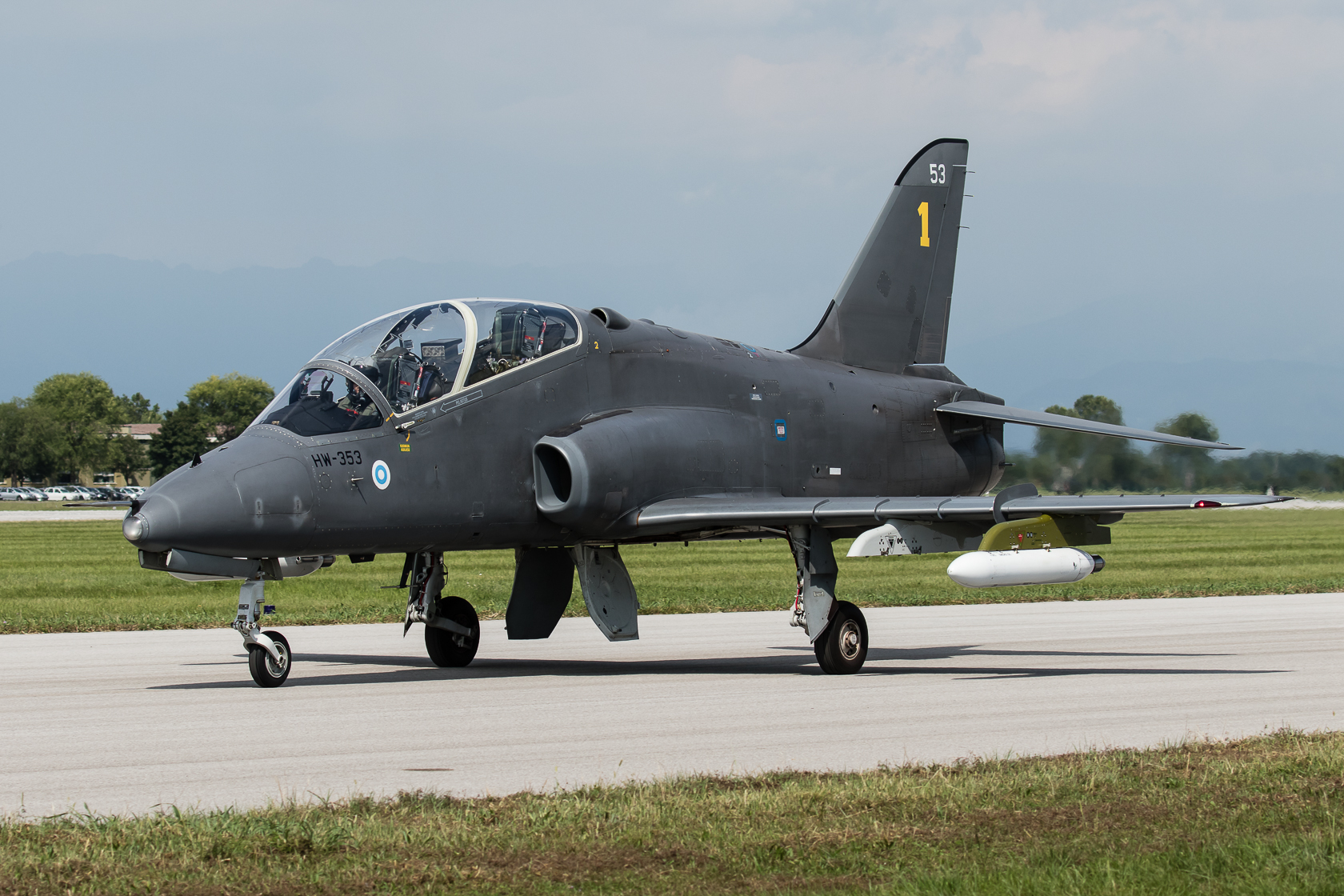
BAE Systems Hawk of the Finnish Air Force in September 2015; the Finnish Air Force was the first export customer of the Hawk

=== Hawker Siddeley Hawk ===
Hooper also led the design team for the Hawker Siddeley Hawk.

== Personal life and death ==
Hooper became a Fellow of the Royal Academy of Engineering in 1999.

Hooper later lived in Ham, London. He died at a care home in Richmond, London, on 12 December 2022, at the age of 96.

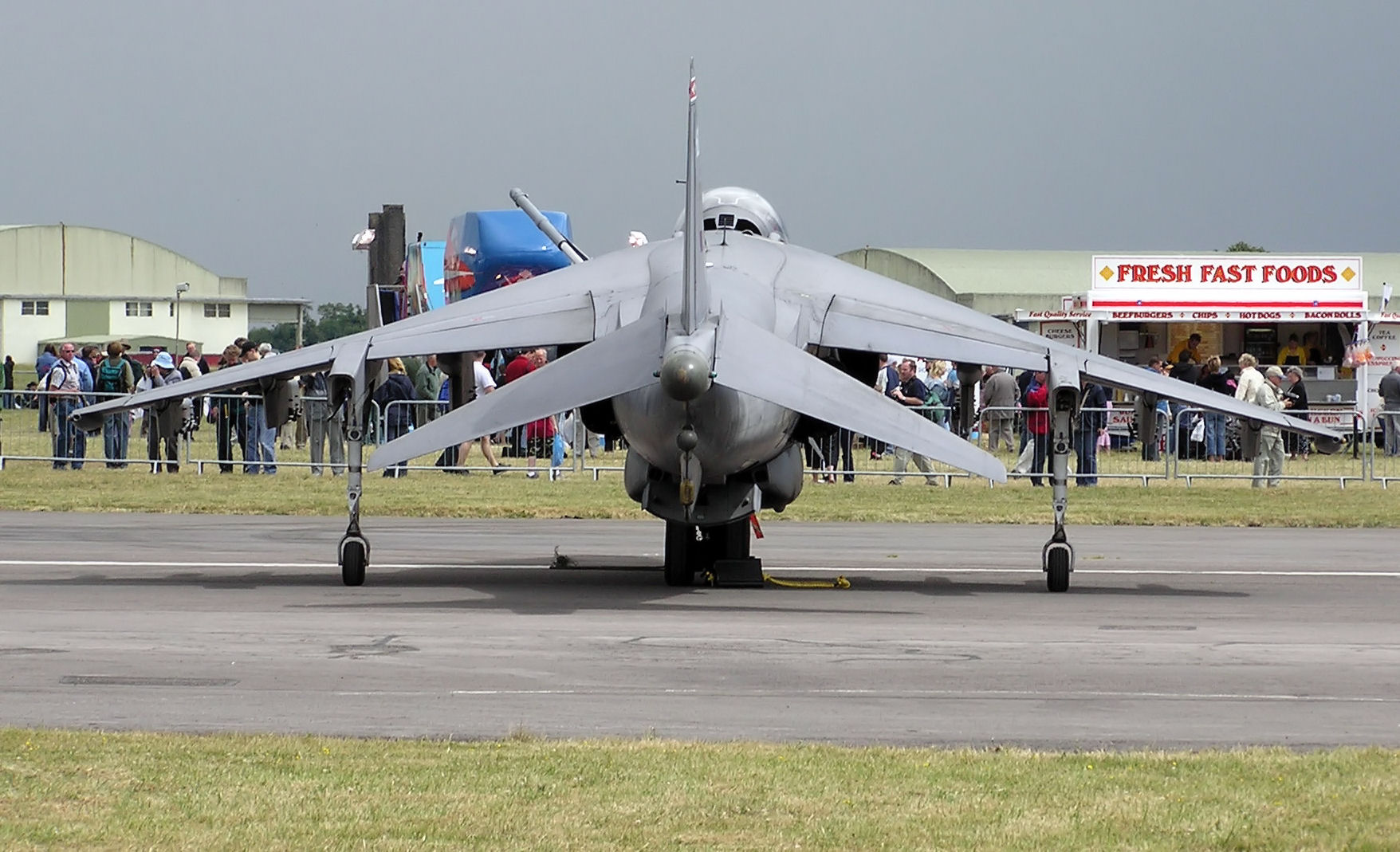
Anhedral wing and undercarriage of the Harrier

== See also ==
- John Dale (engineer), Chief Engineer of the Pegasus engine

Business positions
Preceded by Barry Laight	Chief Engineer of Hawker Siddeley Aircraft; 1968-1977	Succeeded by Company defunct
