= John Fozard =

British aerospace engineer (1928–1996)

John Fozard OBE FRS FREng FRAeS
- Born: John William Fozard; 16 January 1928; Liversedge, West Riding of Yorkshire, England
- Died: 17 July 1996 (aged 68); Alexandria, Virginia, United States
- Education: Hull Municipal Technical College, Cranfield University
- Spouse(s): Mary Ward, Gloria Roberts
- Children: 2
- Engineering career
- Discipline: Aeronautics
- Institutions: RAeS
- Employer: Hawker Siddeley
- Significant design: Hawker Siddeley Harrier
- Significant advance: British Aerospace Sea Harrier
- Awards: British Silver Medal for Aeronautics (1977); James Clayton Prize, IMechE (1983); Mullard Award (1983, with Ralph Hooper)

John William Fozard (16 January 1928 – 17 July 1996) was a British aeronautical engineer who helped to design the Hawker Siddeley Harrier.

== Early life ==
John Fozard was born on 16 January 1928 at 21 Holme Street, Liversedge, West Riding of Yorkshire, the son of John Fozard and Eleanor Paulkitt. He was brought up on the Firthcliffe estate in the same town. He grew up in austerity because his father was unemployed due to spinal injuries and only his maternal grandmother was in full-time employment.

He passed the selection for Heckmondwike Grammar School in the West Riding of Yorkshire, where he excelled academically. In 1942 (aged 14) he joined the Air Training Corps and with them visited RAF stations, where he flew in Lancaster and Halifax bombers.

Fozard's headmaster arranged for interviews with Avro in Yeadon and Blackburn Aircraft in Leeds. Blackburn offered him an apprenticeship that allowed him to study for an engineering degree. In June 1946 he was awarded a London University Intermediate degree. At this time Blackburn transferred Fozard to their Brough site, which allowed to continue his studies full-time at Hull municipal technical college, funded by a West Riding Council scholarship. In July 1948 he was awarded a BSc with first class honours in aeronautical engineering. An extension of his scholarship allowed him to undertake two years postgraduate studies at College of Aeronautics, Cranfield under Prof Sir Robert Lickley where he gained a DCAe (Diploma in Aeronautics) in 1950.

Fozard would later tell American visitors at the Hawker plant on Lower Ham Road next to the River Thames at Kingston upon Thames that Yorkshire was the Texas of the UK.

== Career ==
He worked for Hawker Siddeley from 1950, working under Sydney Camm. In the late 1950s he was working on the supersonic successor to the company's Hawker Hunter, the P.1121, and the twin-seat P.1129. Although advanced designs for their time, these projects were cancelled by the infamous 1957 Defence White Paper, and Hawker concentrated all work on the P.1127, which had been considered less important up to that point.

From October 1963 he was Chief Designer of the P.1154, which was cancelled in February 1965 (with the BAC TSR-2). He was Chief Designer of the Harrier from 1965 to 1978, taking over from Ralph Hooper. The Harrier entered service with the RAF (at RAF Wittering) in August 1969. The first Sea Harrier (XZ451 – FRS.1) was handed to the Royal Navy's Fleet Air Arm on 18 June 1979, at a ceremony at BAe Dunsfold (the site had been owned by Hawker Siddeley from 1950), later to be based at RNAS Yeovilton. This version of the Harrier had been given the definitive go-ahead (funding) on 15 May 1975 by Roy Mason, the Barnsley-born Defence Secretary, after being met with government indifference previously.

The Pegasus engine, which was integral to the aircraft design, was designed by Gordon Lewis and Sir Stanley Hooker.

From 1984–7 he was Divisional Director of Special Projects at the Military Aircraft Division of British Aerospace, Weybridge. In February 1989 he retired from BAe. He later became the director of the National Air and Space Museum, and held the Charles A. Lindbergh Chair in Aerospace History, from 1988–9.

He was elected a Fellow of the Royal Aeronautical Society (FRAeS) in 1963. From 1986 to 1987, he was the president of the Royal Aeronautical Society. He was elected a Fellow of the Royal Society (FRS) in 1987.

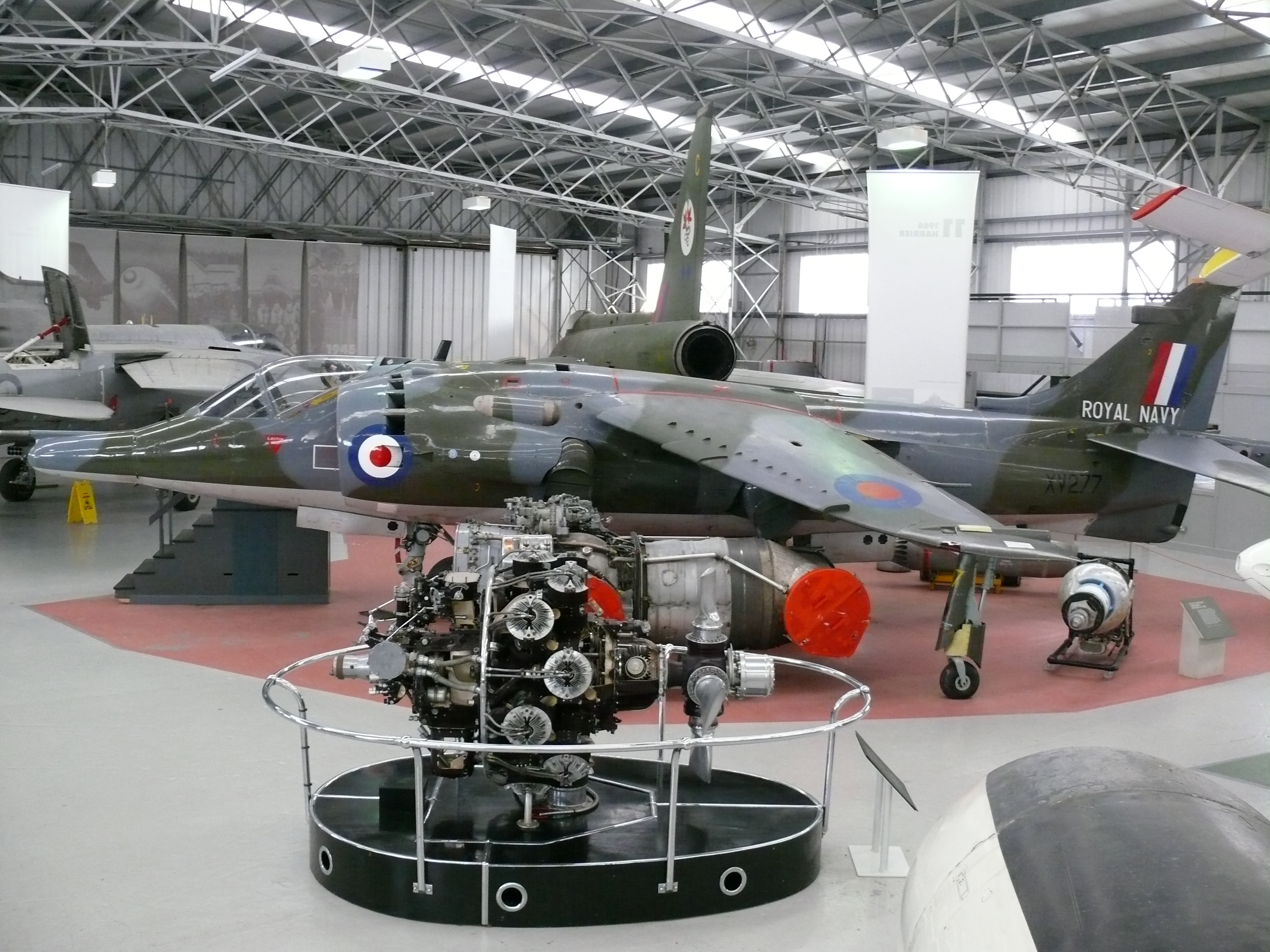
The oldest Harrier in existence, built in 1966, at the National Museum of Flight in East Lothian

== Personal life ==
Fozard married Mary Ward in 1951, but they divorced in 1985. They had two sons. He later married Gloria Roberts in 1985, and they lived in Alexandria, Virginia.

He was appointed an Officer of the Order of the British Empire (OBE) in the 1981 Birthday Honours. He died from liver failure, aged 68.

== Quotations ==
John Fozard was the most capable chief designer I have ever known. He was brilliant but he was a Yorkshire man. He'd got an ego five times the size of the county...

— John Farley

Professional and academic associations
Preceded by Thomas Kerr CB	President of the Royal Aeronautical Society; 1986–1987	Succeeded by Prof John Stollery
