= Hawker Siddeley =

1934–1977 aircraft manufacturer in the United Kingdom

Hawker Siddeley Group Limited
- Type: Public
- Industry: Aerospace, Engineering
- Predecessor: Hawker Aircraft
- Founded: 1934; 92 years ago (as Hawker Siddeley Aircraft Co.)
- Founders: J. D. Siddeley (Co-founder); Thomas Sopwith (Co-founder, Chairman & Life President)
- Defunct: 29 April 1977; 49 years ago (aircraft production); 1992; 34 years ago (whole company)
- Fate: Aircraft business merged with British Aircraft Corporation and Scottish Aviation; Group divested
- Successor: British Aerospace; Bristol Siddeley; Airbus
- Headquarters: Kingston upon Thames, Greater London, United Kingdom
- Key people: Ralph Hooper, Barry Laight, Walter Sydney Douglas Lockwood CBE
- Number of employees: 4,500
- Subsidiaries: Hawker Aircraft; Gloster Aircraft Company; Armstrong Whitworth Aircraft; A. V. Roe and Company; A.V. Roe Canada/Hawker Siddeley Canada (from 1945); Folland Aircraft (from 1959); de Havilland Aircraft (from 1960); Blackburn Aircraft (from 1960)

Hawker Siddeley was a group of British manufacturing companies engaged in aircraft production. Hawker Siddeley combined the legacies of several British aircraft manufacturers, emerging through a series of mergers and acquisitions as one of only two such major British companies in the 1960s. In 1977, Hawker Siddeley became a founding component of the nationalised British Aerospace (BAe). Hawker Siddeley also operated in other industrial markets, such as locomotive building (through its ownership of Brush Traction) and diesel engine manufacture (through its ownership of Lister Petter). The company was once a constituent of the FTSE 100 Index.

== History ==
=== Origins ===
Hawker Siddeley Aircraft was formed in 1935 as a result of the purchase by Hawker Aircraft of the companies of J. D. Siddeley, the automotive and engine builder Armstrong Siddeley and the aircraft manufacturer Armstrong Whitworth Aircraft. At this time, Hawker Siddeley also acquired A.V. Roe & Company (Avro), Gloster Aircraft Company (Gloster) and Air Training Services. The constituent companies continued to produce their own aircraft designs under their own name as well as sharing manufacturing work throughout the group.

During the Second World War, Hawker Siddeley was one of the United Kingdom's most important aviation concerns, producing numerous designs including the famous Hawker Hurricane fighter plane that, along with the Supermarine Spitfire, was Britain's front-line defence in the Battle of Britain. During this campaign, Hurricanes outnumbered all other British fighters combined in service, and were responsible for shooting down 55 per cent of all enemy aircraft destroyed.

=== Avro Canada ===
In 1945, Hawker Siddeley purchased Victory Aircraft of Malton, Ontario, Canada from the Canadian government, renaming the company A.V. Roe Canada, commonly known as Avro Canada, initially a wholly owned subsidiary of Hawker Siddeley. Avro Canada underwent a major expansion through aircraft development and acquisition of aircraft engine, mining, steel, railway rolling stock, computers, electronics, and other businesses to become, by 1958, Canada's third largest company directly employing over 14,000 people and providing 45% of the parent company's revenues. During its operation, Avro Canada aircraft (built) included the C102 Jetliner, CF-100 Canuck, CF-105 Arrow and VZ-9- AV Avrocar. Only the CF-100 fighter entered full-scale production. Other design projects (not built) included supersonic transport (SST) passenger aircraft, a Mach-2 VTOL fighter, hovercraft, a jet engine-powered tank, and the hypersonic Space Threshold Vehicle. After the cancellation of the Arrow, the company began to unravel. In 1962, A.V. Roe Canada was dissolved and the remaining assets were transferred to the now defunct Hawker Siddeley Canada.

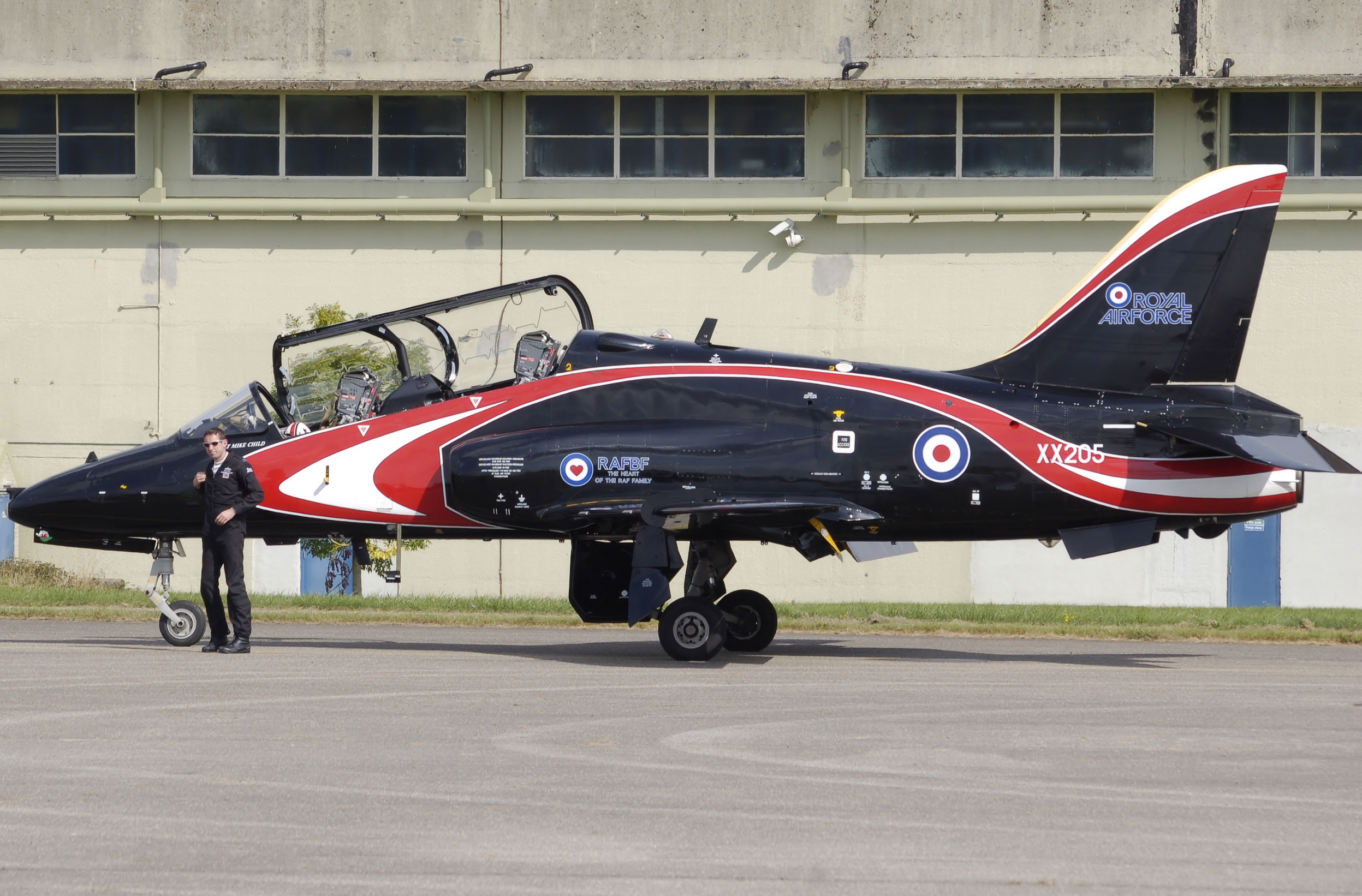
Royal Air Force Hawker Siddeley Hawk T.1A, with its pilot. This aircraft, used for aerobatic displays, is in a special colour scheme.

=== Post-war era ===
In 1948, the company name was changed to Hawker Siddeley Group. The aircraft division became Hawker Siddeley Aviation (HSA) and the guided missile and space technology operations as Hawker Siddeley Dynamics (HSD). In 1959, the aero engine business, Armstrong Siddeley was merged with that of the Bristol Aero Engines to form Bristol Siddeley. In the late 1950s, the British government decided that with the decreasing number of aircraft contracts being offered, it was better to merge the existing companies, of which there were about 15 surviving at this point, into several much larger firms. Out of this decision, came the "order" that all future contracts being offered had to include agreements to merge companies. In 1959, Folland Aircraft was acquired, followed by de Havilland Aircraft Company and Blackburn Aircraft in 1960. In 1963, the names of the constituent companies were dropped, with products being rebranded as "Hawker Siddeley" or "HS". In this period, the company developed the first operational, and, by far, the most successful VTOL jet aircraft, the Harrier family. This aircraft remained in production into the 1990s and remains in service.

==== Hawker Siddeley Nuclear Power Company ====
The Hawker Siddeley Nuclear Power Company built and operated the 10 kW JASON reactor in Langley, Berkshire (then in Buckinghamshire). The reactor was in operation there from 1959 to 1962 and generated a total of 1.4 MWh before being shut down and transported to the Royal Naval College in Greenwich, London.

==== Kingston headquarters and factory ====
In 1948, Hawker Siddeley acquired a factory in Kingston upon Thames, Surrey, on the Richmond Road near Ham. This was to become their main aircraft factory and headquarters.

==== Expansion into railways ====
In 1957, Hawker Siddeley purchased the Brush group of companies that included Brush Electrical Machines, and Brush Traction, which manufactures electromotive equipment and railway locomotives. The Brush prototype locomotives Falcon, and the futuristic but overweight HS4000 Kestrel, were produced there. Other railway engineering assets were acquired, including Westinghouse Brake & Signal and the engine builder Mirrlees Blackstone, which came with the Brush businesses.

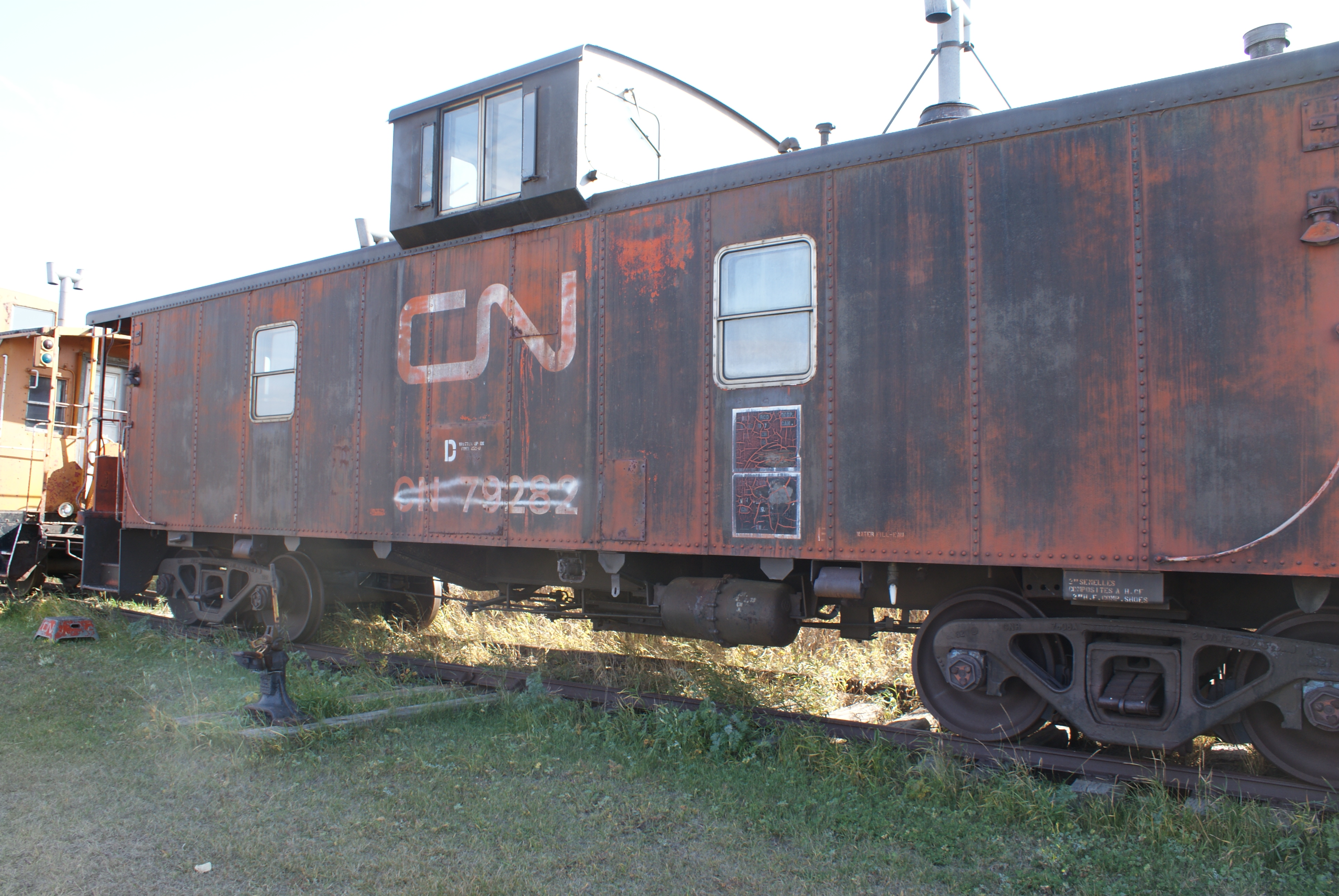
Caboose built in the Hawker Siddeley plant of Thunder Bay, Ontario

In the early 1970s, Hawker Siddeley's Canada Car and Foundry subsidiary began to build rapid transit vehicles for the North American market. The first order was for the Port Authority Trans-Hudson line and consisted of 46 PA-3 cars numbers 724–769, which were largely based on the original hexagonal profile PA-1 & PA-2 cars designed and built by the St. Louis Car Company during 1966–67. Hawker Siddeley later sold the same general design to the MBTA in Boston for their Blue and Orange Lines. 70 48' cars were delivered to the Blue Line in 1978–80 and 120 65' cars were delivered to the Orange Line in 1980–81. Hawker Siddeley also manufactured much of the Toronto subway system's older rolling stock, the H5 and H6 models. The heavy rail manufacturing business, based in Mississauga and Thunder Bay, Ontario, are now part of Alstom.

MBTA also bought a number of commuter rail coaches from the German firm Messerschmitt, thereby teaming Hawker Siddeley with its old World War II rival under the same organisation.

=== Nationalisation of aircraft production ===
On 29 April 1977, as a result of the Aircraft and Shipbuilding Industries Act 1977, Hawker Siddeley Aviation and Dynamics were nationalised and merged with British Aircraft Corporation (BAC) and Scottish Aviation to form British Aerospace. However, HSA and HSD accounted for only 25% of the Hawker Siddeley business by this time, and the non-aviation and foreign interests were retained by a holding company known as Hawker Siddeley Group Plc after 1980.

=== Rationalisation and sale to BTR ===
The group rationalised in the 1980s, concentrating on railway engineering and signalling, industrial electronics and instrumentation and signalling equipment.

Orenda Aerospace, the only remaining original company from the Avro Canada / Hawker Siddeley Canada era, although greatly diminished in size and scope of operations, became part of the Magellan Aerospace Corporation.

The late 1980s also saw Hawker Siddeley divest itself of much of its other North American heavy manufacturing enterprises. Its Talladega, Alabama-based TreeFarmer heavy equipment business was sold to Franklin Equipment in 1990 and its Canadian rail car production facilities were split between SNC-Lavalin and Bombardier in 1992.

In 1992, Hawker Siddeley Group Plc was acquired by BTR plc for £1.5bn. This was led by Alan Jackson and Sir Owen Green who were the CEO and Chairman of BTR respectively during this time. Through a series of takeovers, the business units finally became part of Schneider Electric in 2014.

=== Hawker Siddeley name today ===
In 1973, HS acquired the industrial electronics firm South Wales Switchgear. Later known as Aberdare Holdings, in 1992 this company was renamed Hawker Siddeley Switchgear (HSS). They have an Australian subsidiary, Hawker Siddeley Switchgear Australia. Another company which retains the name is Hawker Siddeley Power Transformers.

In 1993, British Aerospace sold its corporate jet product line to the American Raytheon Company. In 2006 the product line was sold to a new company to be known as Hawker Beechcraft, owned by Onex Partners and Goldman Sachs.

== Products ==
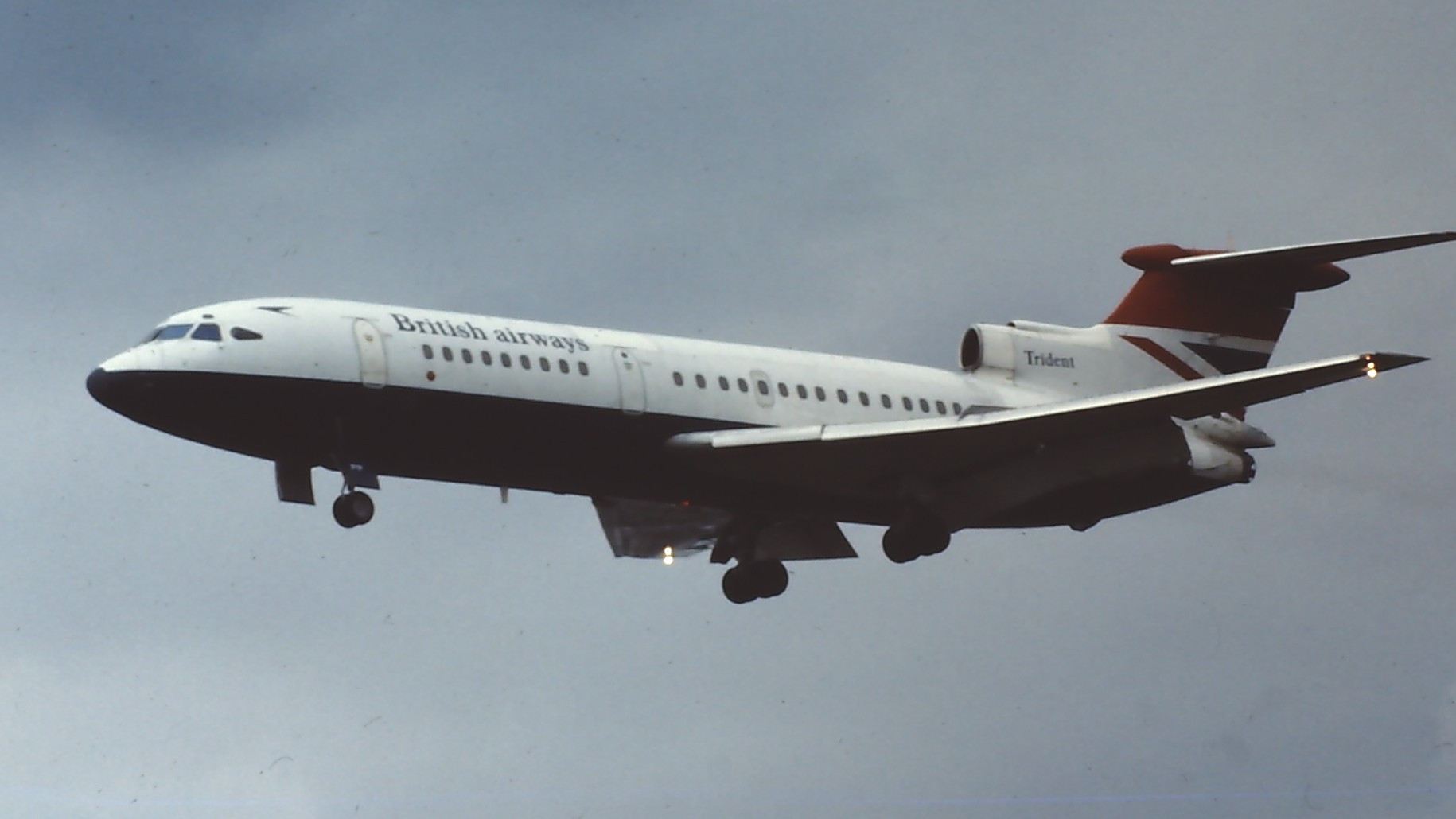
A Hawker Siddeley Trident

=== Aircraft ===
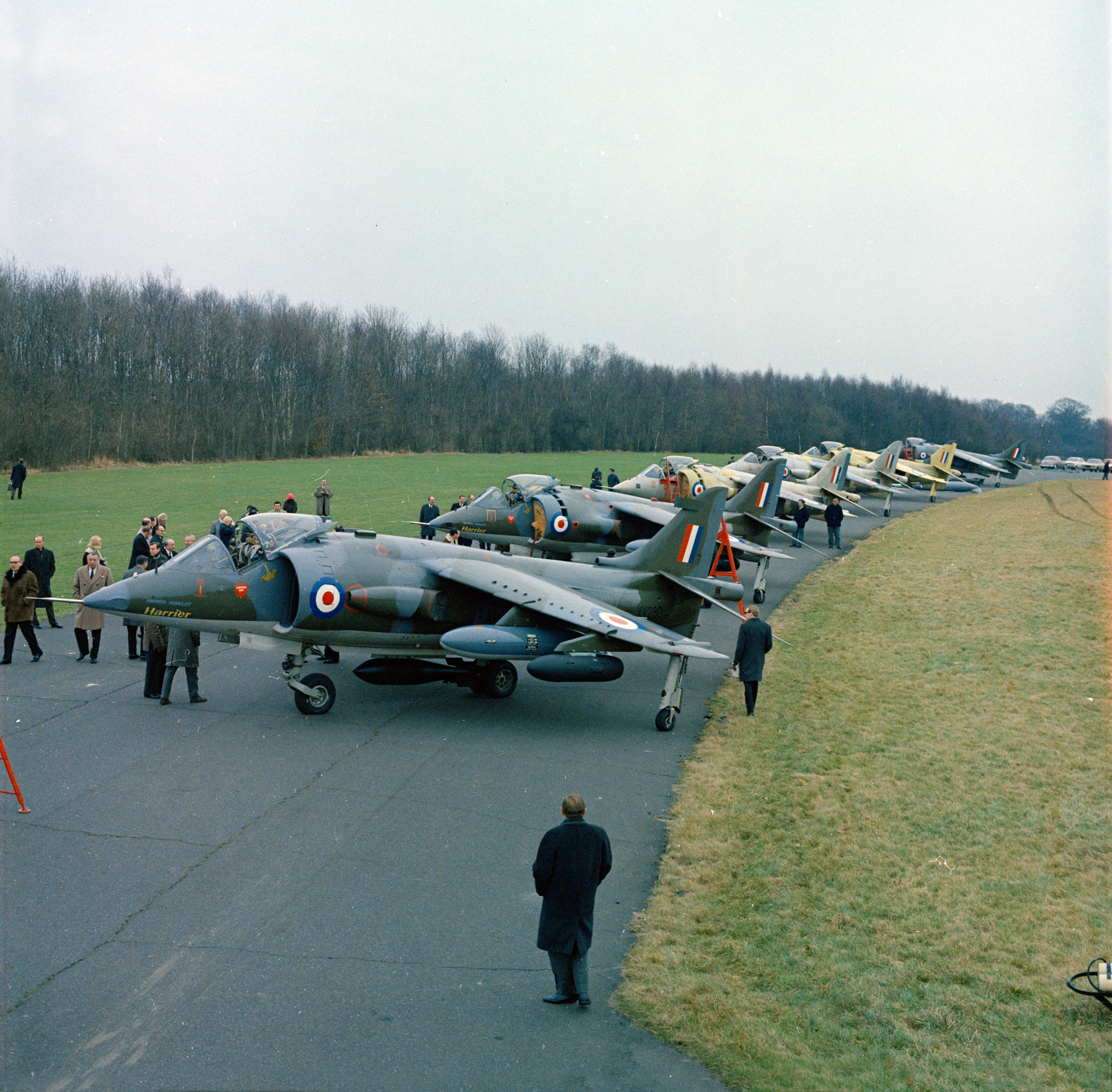
Six pre-production Hawker Siddeley Harrier GR.1s pictured at the manufacturer's test facility of Hawker Siddeley at Dunsfold Aerodrome in 1968

The Hawker Siddeley name was not used to brand aircraft until 1963. Prior to then, aircraft were produced under the name of the subsidiary company (e.g. Hawker Hurricane, Hawker Sea Hawk, Gloster Javelin, Gloster Meteor). First flight date is in parentheses.

- HS.121 Trident (1962) – originated as de Havilland DH.121 airliner.
- HS.125 and Dominie (1962) – originated as the de Havilland DH.125. Military service as Dominie
- P.1017 (1962) – VTOL capable strike fighter concept
- HS.138 (1969) – VTOL strike aircraft project.
- HS.141 (1978/1979) – V/STOL airliner project submission.
- HS.146 (1981) – entered production and later renamed the BAe 146.
- HS.748 (1960) – originated as Avro 748 turboprop airliner.
- HS.780 Andover (1965) – military derivative of HS748
- P.139B – AEW and COD aircraft project.
- P.1121 – a Hawker project
- P.1127 Kestrel (1964) – a Hawker project
- Harrier (1966) – see also Harrier jump jet
- P.1154 (1960s) – V/STOL combat aircraft project
- HS.801 Nimrod (1967) – development of the de Havilland Comet as a naval patrol aircraft
  - Nimrod R.1 (1973) – signals intelligence aircraft
- HS.1182 Hawk (1974) – advanced jet trainer
- HS.1200
- HS.1201
- HS.1202
- Airbus A300 – Hawker Siddeley designed and built the wings of the A300 airliner.
- Argosy (1959) – known as Armstrong Whitworth Argosy until individual "brands" dropped in 1963. Built by Hawker Siddeley during the early 1960s. The last Argosy was built in 1965.
- Buccaneer (1958) – originated as the Blackburn Buccaneer. Hawker Siddeley built the Buccaneer for the Royal Navy, plus the South African Air Force during the 1960s, also a number of S Mk.2B aircraft for the Royal Air Force.
- Comet 4 – first flying as the de Havilland Comet airliner in 1949. The Comet 4 was still being built by Hawker Siddeley in the early 1960s. The final Comet 4 rolled off the production line in 1964.
- Dove – originated as the de Havilland Dove. Hawker Siddeley built the Dove during the 1960s. The last Dove was rolled off the production line in 1967.
- Gnat – originated as the Folland Gnat. Hawker Siddeley built a number Gnats during the early 1960s, for the Finnish Air Force, Indian Air Force and the RAF.
- Heron – originated as the de Havilland Heron. Built by Hawker Siddeley in the early 1960s. The Last Heron was rolled off the production line in 1963.
- Hunter – originated as the Hawker Hunter. The Hunter was still being built by Hawker Siddeley in early 1960s. The final Hunter rolled off the production line in 1966.
- Sea Vixen – originated as the de Havilland Sea Vixen. Hawker Siddeley built the Sea Vixen during the early 1960s. The last Sea Vixen was delivered to the Royal Navy in 1965.
- Vulcan – originated as the Avro Vulcan. Hawker Siddeley built the Vulcan during the early 1960s. The last Vulcan was delivered to the RAF in 1965.
- Armstrong Whitworth AW.681 – transport project renamed as HS.681
- Hawker Siddeley Helicrane – a cancelled flying crane helicopter project in three variants, HS (Helicopter Small), HM (Helicopter Medium) and HL (Helicopter Large). The project was inherited from Blackburn, their Blackburn SP.62 design had six Bristol Siddeley turbojets in the rotor head exhausting at the rotor tips.
- Hawker Siddeley P.1184-16 Dash 18 – prototype V/STOL; tail gunner cockpit for aiming Taildog missiles

=== Missiles and rockets ===
- Blue Steel – "stand-off" nuclear weapon developed by Avro
- Blue Streak (missile) – de Havilland medium range nuclear missile
- de Havilland Firestreak – air-to-air missile
- Europa (rocket) – Hawker Siddeley built the first stage of the Europa rocket (derived from the Blue Streak).
- Martel (missile) in collaboration with Matra
- Red Top
- Sea Dart – surface-to-air missile
- Sea Slug – Armstrong Whitworth surface-to-air missile.
- Taildog/SRAAM, an experimental missile that eventually turned into the BAE ASRAAM.

=== Space hardware ===
- Miranda (spacecraft), also known as X-4, a British satellite in low Earth orbit

=== Heavy Equipment ===
- TreeFarmer (heavy logging equipment)

=== Hawker Siddeley Canada ===
The Canadian subsidiary produced rail cars, transit vehicles and engines (aircraft and ship).

== Key people ==
=== Aircraft designers and engineers ===
- Sydney Camm
- Roy Chaplin
- Richard Clarkson
- Stuart Davies (engineer)
- John Fozard
- Bob Grigg
- Ralph Hooper
- Barry Laight

=== Test pilots ===
- Bill Bedford
- Bill Humble
- Mike Snelling

=== Managing Directors and Chairmans ===
- Sir Roy Dobson
- Sir Arnold Alexander Hall
- Sir John Lidbury
- Eric Rubython CBE
- R.R Kenderdine
- C.D.MacQuaide;
- Alan Watkins
- Sir Peter Baxendell (Chairman)

=== Founder President ===
- Sir Thomas Sopwith

== See also ==
- Aerospace industry in the United Kingdom
