= Hawker P.1103 =

Cancelled British interceptor aircraft design

P.1103
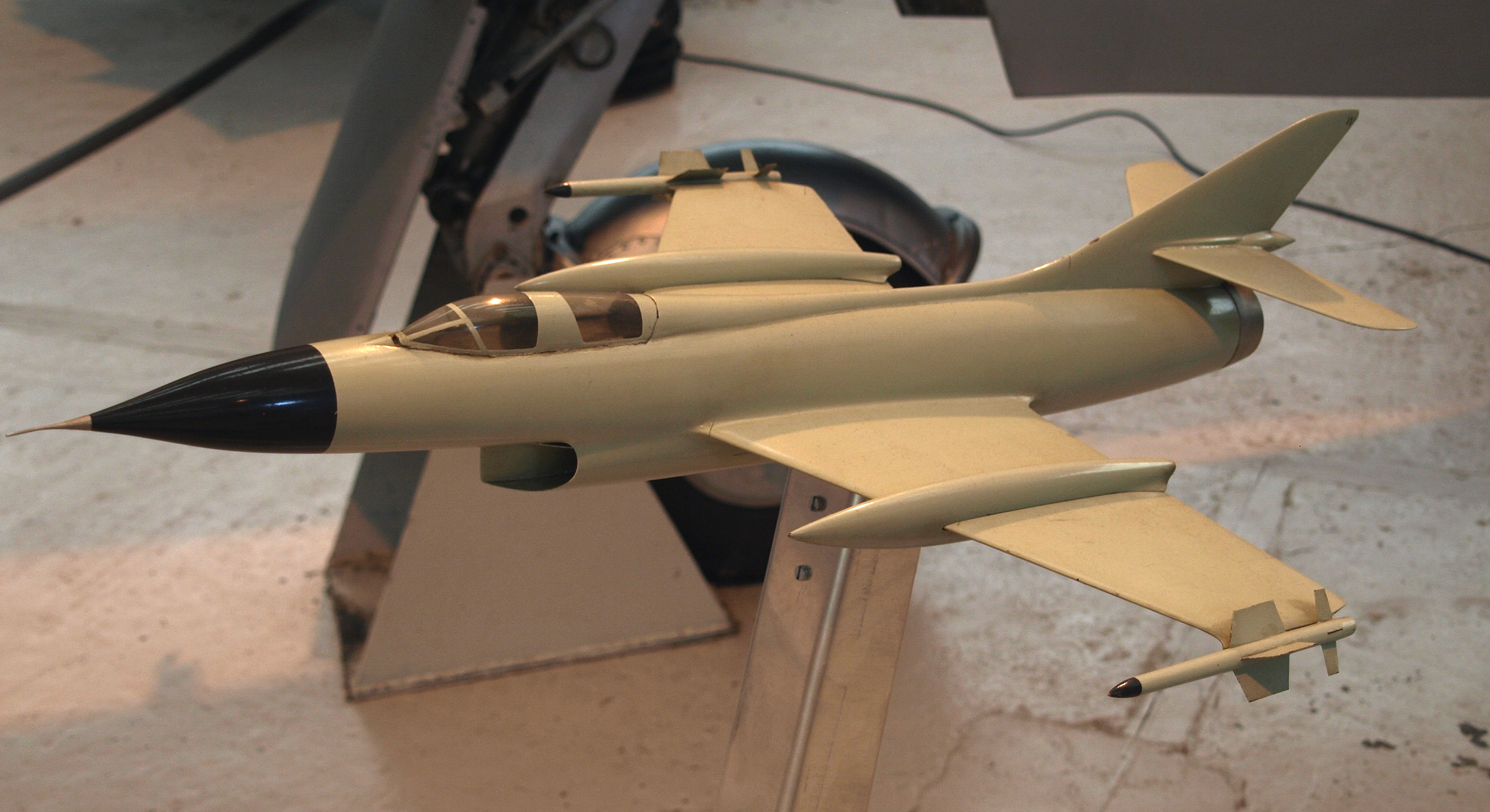
- Model of P.1103 on display at the Royal Air Force Museum Cosford

General information
- Type: Interceptor
- National origin: United Kingdom
- Manufacturer: Hawker Aircraft
- Status: Design only
- Number built: None

The Hawker P.1103 was a design by Hawker Aircraft to meet the British Operational Requirement F.155; it did not progress further than the drawing board.

== Background ==
Operational Requirement F.155 was an Operational Requirement issued by the British Ministry of Supply in 1955 for an interceptor aircraft to defend the United Kingdom from high flying supersonic bombers.

F.155 specified exacting demands:

- The capability of making an intercept within 20 minutes of target contact (250 miles from the UK) with a target speed of Mach 1+
- Ceiling: 60,000 ft (18,000 m)
- Armament: a mixture of infra-red guided missiles and radar guided missiles
- Crew: A crew of two was specified because of the anticipated workload: pilot plus weapon systems operator (WSO)/navigator

The Ministry of Supply made clear in the requirement that the plane and missiles should be treated as a "weapon system" i.e., a cohesive whole. The armament specifications were covered by a separate Operational Requirement, OR.1131, which listed two missile systems: the infra-red guided de Havilland "Blue Vesta" and the radar-guided Vickers "Red Hebe".

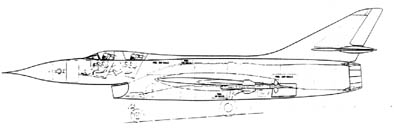
P.1103 line drawing

The submission by Hawker Siddeley a design by the legendary designer Sir Sydney Camm was effectively a supersonic development of his successful Hawker Hunter design, using a single engine - a 25,000 lb development of the de Havilland Gyron breathing through an under-chin air intake. Two detachable rocket boosters, to give a 3.7 minute boost, were carried in mid-wing nacelles.

== 1957 Defence White Paper ==
Although a nuclear threat from high-flying Soviet supersonic nuclear-armed bombers was identified in 1955, F.155 calling for supersonic interceptors (in service by 1962) was superseded by the 1957 Defence White Paper. The paper was a major review of military spending and one of its elements was the cancellation of nearly all manned fighter projects as a radical change had occurred in strategic threats with the expectation that intercontinental ballistic missiles and low-level strike would replace high flying bombers.

== Specifications ==
Data from Futile Rivals, British secret projects : jet fighters since 1950

General characteristics

- Crew: 2
- Length: 63 ft (19 m)
- Wingspan: 39 ft (12 m)
- Height: 15 ft 6 in (4.72 m)
- Wing area: 500 sq ft (46 m^{2})
- Max takeoff weight: 41,850 lb (18,983 kg) with Red Hebe missiles
- Fuel capacity: 1,100 imp gal (1,300 US gal; 5,000 L) internal
- Powerplant: 1 × de Havilland Gyron , 20,000 lbf (89 kN) thrust dry, 25,000 lbf (110 kN) with afterburner
- Powerplant: 2 × rocket detachable self contained boosters, 2,000 lbf (8.9 kN) thrust each

Performance

- Maximum speed: Mach 2.0
- Never exceed speed: 864 mph (1,390 km/h, 751 kn) at low altitudes (Mach 2.3 at high altitude)
- Service ceiling: 68,000 ft (21,000 m) +
- Rate of climb: 61,000 ft/min (310 m/s) at sea level

Armament

- Missiles: 2 × Red Top or 2 × Red Hebe air-to-air missiles or 2 × Blue Jay missiles mounted on the wingtips

== See also ==
Related development

- Hawker P.1121

Aircraft of comparable role, configuration and era

- Convair F-106 Delta Dart
- Dassault Mirage III
- English Electric Lightning
- Lockheed F-104A
- MiG-21
- Saab 35 Draken
- Sukhoi Su-9
