= Operational Requirement F.155 =

British military defense specification

Operational Requirement F.155 was a specification issued by the British Ministry of Supply on 15 January 1955 for an interceptor aircraft to defend the United Kingdom from Soviet high-flying nuclear-armed supersonic bombers.

Discussion about the need for a new supersonic interceptor had been ongoing for some time in the early 1950s, and several designs introduced, but improving radar systems and weapons mooted the need for better aircraft in the short term. Information about new Soviet supersonic bomber designs emerged in 1954, sparking serious consideration for the first time. The Requirement emerged as a much larger and longer-range system than previously studied. The Requirement called for aircraft to be in service by 1962, the same date as the Tupolev Tu-22. (Note: This risk turned out to be overblown; the Tu-22 suffered significant performance problems that so limited its range that only small numbers were deployed as bombers.)

A number of designs were entered into the competition, many of them based on earlier projects. They generally featured two engines, mounted a powerful new aircraft interception (AI) radar, and would be armed with improved versions of the de Havilland Firestreak missile or an even larger radar-guided design known as "Red Hebe". In overall terms, the F.155 designs were similar to the Convair F-106 or Avro Arrow, although longer range was desired.

Serious design work had only just started when the entire effort was cancelled as part of the 1957 Defence White Paper. This paper considered the introduction of new Soviet medium range ballistic missiles (MRBMs) that were being deployed in East Germany; these were armed with chemical warheads, but it was clear that nuclear-armed versions would be available by the mid-1960s. In this case, shooting down bombers would have no ultimate effect on the outcome of the battle. The paper led to the cancellation of nearly all crewed fighter projects as well as most other air defence programs as a radical change had occurred in strategic threats with the expectation that missiles and low-level strike would replace high-flying bombers.

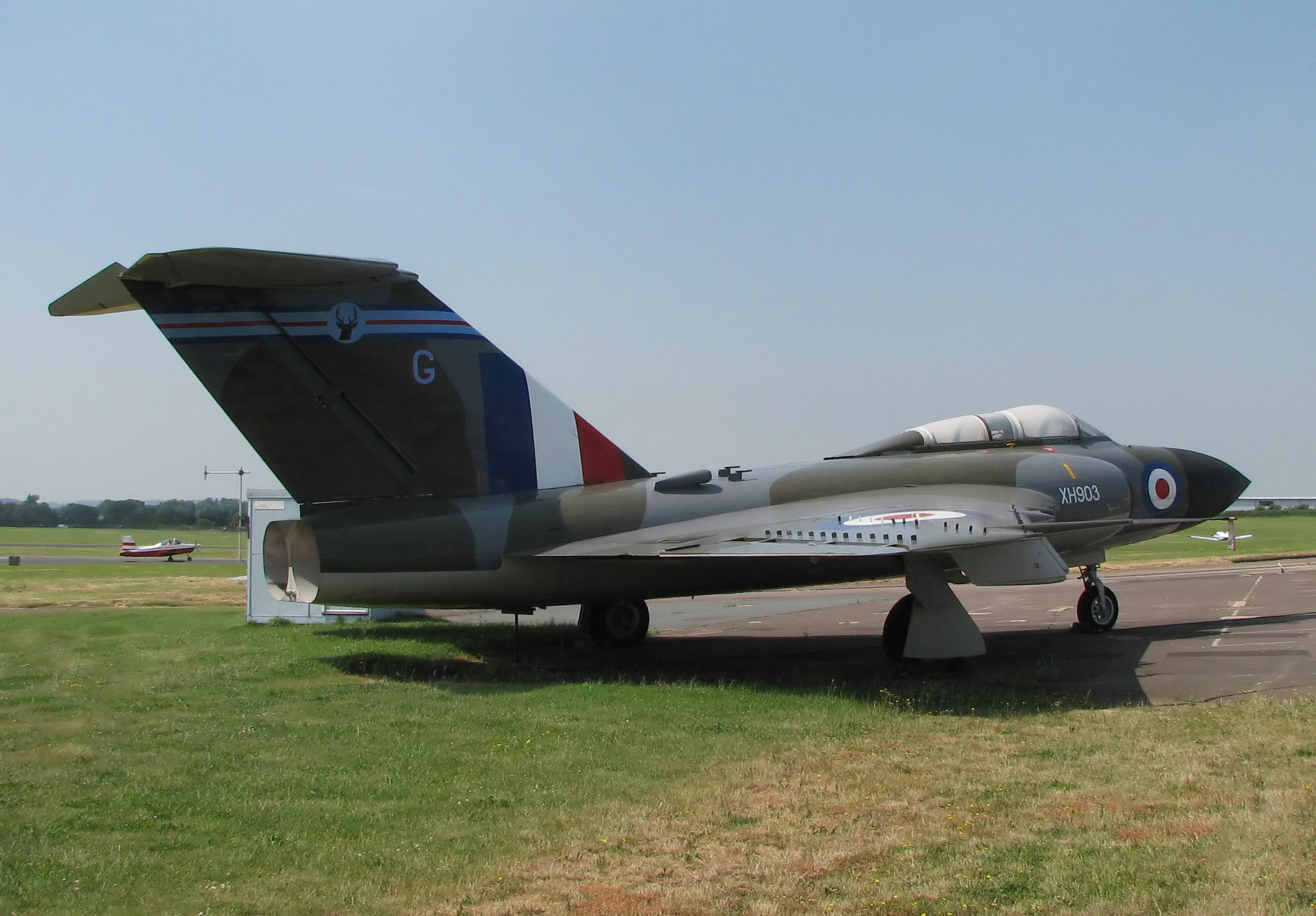
Gloster Javelin all-weather fighter in service at the time.

== Background ==
During the early 1950s, the RAF's front line defence was converting from Gloster Meteor (a design that first flew during the Second World War) to Gloster Javelin all-weather fighters with the anticipation of new interceptors coming into service in the near-future. These included the English Electric Lightning (point defence interceptor) and Saunders-Roe SR.177 interceptors in development. While the Lightning embodied largely conventional jet engine technology, the SR.177 was a "mixed" rocket/jet design that used rocket power for delivering high speed and maximum altitude performance. Due to the length of design and development, for the interim the RAF also considered purchase of the Canadian Avro CF-105 Arrow projected to be operational by 1961.

== Requirement ==
Operation Requirement F.155 specified exacting demands:

- The capability of making an intercept within 20 minutes of target contact (250 miles from the UK)
- target speed would be Mach 1+
- ceiling: 60,000 ft (18,000 m)
- Armament: a mixture of infra-red guided missiles and radar guided missiles
- Crew: Two (pilot, weapons systems/navigation); a crew of two was specified because of the anticipated workload.

The Ministry of Supply made clear in the requirement that the plane and missiles should be treated as a "weapon system" i.e., a cohesive whole. The armament specifications were covered by a separate Operational Requirement: OR.1131. Two missiles were identified in OR.1131:

- Blue Vesta to be developed by de Havilland and
- Red Hebe by Vickers, a scaled down version of their Red Dean missile.

A smaller version of Red Hebe would eventually also come into the equation. Blue Vesta was a 150 kg (330 lb) infra-red guided weapon for attack from a pursuit angle. The Blue Vesta was largely displaced by the development of Blue Jay Mark 4 (which would enter service as Red Top). Red Hebe was nearly 600 kg (1,300 lb) but being radar guided, it would be able to hit its target from any firing angle including a collision course intercept.

== Designs ==
Most British manufacturers provided their own suggestions for planes that would meet the specification. At the same time the engine manufacturers were encouraged to develop the necessary powerplants. These included the de Havilland Gyron and Rolls-Royce RB.106.

Saunders-Roe came up with the P.187: a logical progression from the SR.53 and SR.177 mixed power (rocket and jet engines) interceptors. This gave both rapid acceleration and the capability to operate at high altitudes where jets would be inefficient due to the thin air. Saunders-Roe judged that a big aircraft would be needed to carry 2 IR and 2 radar-guided missiles and the fuel required. A highly streamlined futuristic-looking design (using a drooped nose) it would have been powered by 2 PS.52 jets, a projected development of the Gyron giving 35,000 lb (155.6 kN) of thrust, and 4 Spectre rockets, giving a speed of Mach 2.5 at 76,000 ft (23,165 m). It was judged, at 98,000 lb (3 times the weight of the SR.177) and 84 ft long (26 m), as too big.

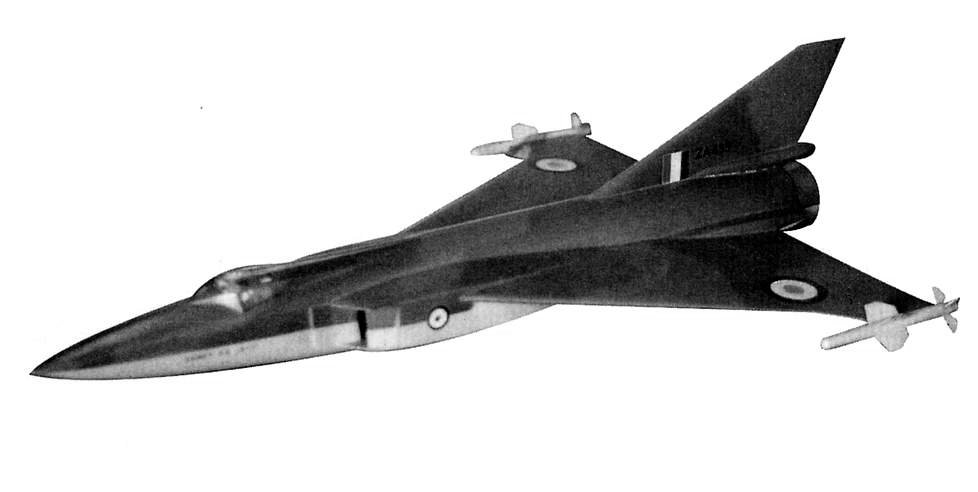
A projected fighter derivative of Fairey's successful FD2 experimental aircraft

Fairey drew on their experience with the Fairey Delta 2 (FD2). Their first proposal was a single-engined fighter development of the existing FD2, which was felt to have good export potential although it did not meet the RAF criteria laid down in O.R. F.155. A larger twin-engined design tailored to the operational requirement followed on from this, which became known simply as the "Delta III". A fighter-bomber derivative of this aircraft was also envisaged, with Bristol Olympus 21R engines coupled with a large ventral drop tank giving a much-improved radius of action at low altitude. Fairey, like some of the other manufacturers, felt that carrying 4 missiles was too onerous especially given the size of the radar guided Red Hebe and provided designs based on a payload of only two missiles. They also took the mixed power route for both the FD2 based and the new 'FD3' designs, with both making provision for the fitting of de Havilland rocket engines.

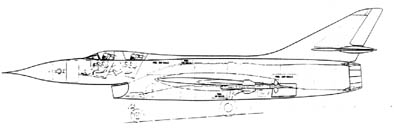
Hawker P.1103 company schematic drawing

Going on the basis of the smallest aircraft that could do the job, Hawker's design (the P.1103) used a single, albeit powerful, engine – a 25,000 lb (111.1 kN) development of the Gyron. Alternative engines in the form of the Rolls-Royce RB.122, Armstrong-Siddeley P.173 and the Canadian Orenda PS.13 were also options. Two detachable rocket boosters, to give a 3.7-minute boost, were carried in midwing nacelles.

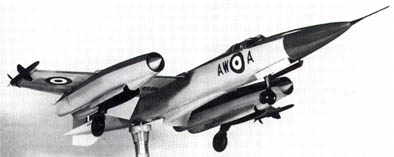
Armstrong-Whitworth AW.169 manufacturer's model

Armstrong-Whitworth put forward their AW.169. A razor-thin straight wing carried the engines in nacelles – two Gyron Juniors on each side – with a rocket booster under the long narrow fuselage. Two missiles were carried, one on each wingtip.

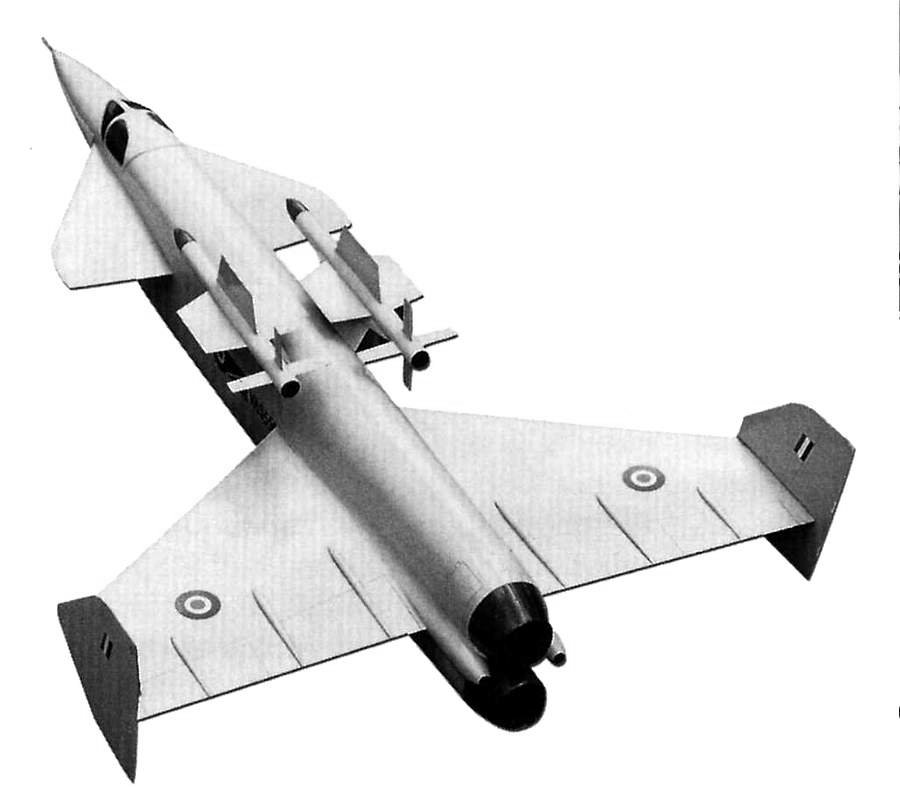
Vickers Type 559

Vickers-Armstrong submitted the Type 559; an unorthodox canard design with a massive chin air intake, split vertically, for two reheated Gyron engines placed, as in the English Electric Lightning, one above the other. Two Spectre Junior rockets were situated each side of the jets at wing level. Two Red Hebe or Blue Jay missiles were mounted alongside the upper part of the fuselage between the canard and the mainplane, which had end-plates incorporating twin rudders.

De Havilland submitted a relatively small design when compared to the giants from Fairey and Saunders-Roe. The DH.117 was to be powered by two Gyron Junior turbojets and a Spectre booster rocket in the tail, with a crew of two seated in tandem. Provision was not made for Red Hebe, the de Havilland team preferring the company's own line of missiles that would culminate in Red Top.

English Electric submitted a design based on their successful P.1B short-range interceptor that would become the Lightning. The P.8 was larger overall, carried a crew of two, moved the weapons to the wingtips and undercarriage to the fuselage but featured the same vertically-stacked engine and nose intake layout as the Lightning. The radar package was to be the same AI-23 AIRPASS system as the Lightning but with a larger scanner dish to improve detection range. At the time, English Electric engineers were far from convinced of the ability of fighter aircraft to carry both radar- and infrared-guided weapons, so designed the P.8 to only carry the de Havilland Blue Jay Mk.4, which would enter service as Red Top.

The AW.169 and Fairey's Delta III design were considered to be the best two contenders taking into account the design of the aircraft, the development risks, the capabilities of the design teams and the manufacturers' workloads – Bristol had not been invited to tender because of the importance of the Bristol 188 high speed research plane they were working on. Initially further work was contracted on both designs but by the end of the year the AW.169 was dropped and the Fairey design become a firm choice. However, in April the following year, the 1957 Defence White Paper terminated nearly all crewed fighter development projects.

== Proposed specifications ==
=== SR.187 ===
Data from

General characteristics

- Crew: 2 (pilot and navigator)
- Length: 25.5 m (83 ft 6 in)
- Wingspan: 15.7 m (51 ft 7 in)
- Height: 6.6 m (21 ft 8 in)
- Empty weight: 24,810 kg (54,700 lb)
- Gross weight: 43,990 kg (97,000 lb)
- Powerplant: 2 × de Havilland Gyron P.S.52 afterburning turbojet, 111.2 kN (25,000 lbf) thrust each dry, 155.7 kN (35,000 lbf) with afterburner
- Powerplant: 4 × de Havilland developed Spectre 5 rocket, 44.5 kN (10,000 lbf) thrust each

Performance

- Maximum speed: Mach 2.5
- Range: 480 km (300 mi, 260 nmi)
- Service ceiling: 23,080 m (76,000 ft)

Armament

- Missiles: OR 3101 (2 radar- and 2 infrared-guided missiles)

=== AW.169 ===
Data from

General characteristics

- Crew: 1
- Length: 25.60 m (84 ft 0 in)
- Wingspan: 13.82 m (45 ft 4 in)
- Gross weight: 24,494 kg (54,000 lb)
- Fuel capacity: 11,600 lb (5,300 kg) kerosene, 4,500 lb (2,000 kg) HTP
- Powerplant: 4 × de Havilland Gyron Junior turbojet
- Powerplant: 1 × Armstrong Siddeley rocket

Performance

- Maximum speed: 3,580 km/h (2,220 mph, 1,930 kn) at altitude
- Maximum speed: Mach 2.5

Armament

- Missiles: 2 x Red Dean air-to-air missiles

Avionics
GEC X Band AI Mk 18 derivative, Q band ranging radar

=== Fairey 'Delta III' ===
Data from

General characteristics

- Crew: 2
- Length: 22.6 m (74 ft 4 in)
- Wingspan: 14.2 m (46 ft 10 in)
- Wing area: 102 m^{2} (1,100 sq ft)
- Gross weight: 22,888 kg (50,460 lb) with 2 Red Dean
- Powerplant: 2 × Rolls-Royce RB.122 turbojet, 76 kN (17,000 lbf) thrust each dry, 89 kN (20,000 lbf) with afterburner
- Powerplant: 2 × de Havilland Spectre Junior rocket, 22 kN (5,000 lbf) thrust each

Performance

- Maximum speed: 2,387 km/h (1,483 mph, 1,289 kn) at 36,000 ft (11,000 m)
- Maximum speed: Mach 2.27

Armament

- Missiles: 2 x Red Dean or 2 x Blue Jay Mk.4

== Bibliography ==
- Buttler, Tony. British Secret Projects: Jet Fighters Since 1950. Leicester, UK: Midland Publishing, 2000, ISBN 1-85780-095-8.
- Buttler, Tony. "Futile Rivals: F.155T– The Quest for 'An Ultimate in Interceptors'." Air Enthusiast No. 61, January–February 1996.
- Wood, Derek. Project Cancelled: British Aircraft That Never Flew. Indianapolis: The Bobbs-Merrill Company, 1975. ISBN 0-672-52166-0.
