= Hawker P.1121 =

British supersonic fighter aircraft

P.1121
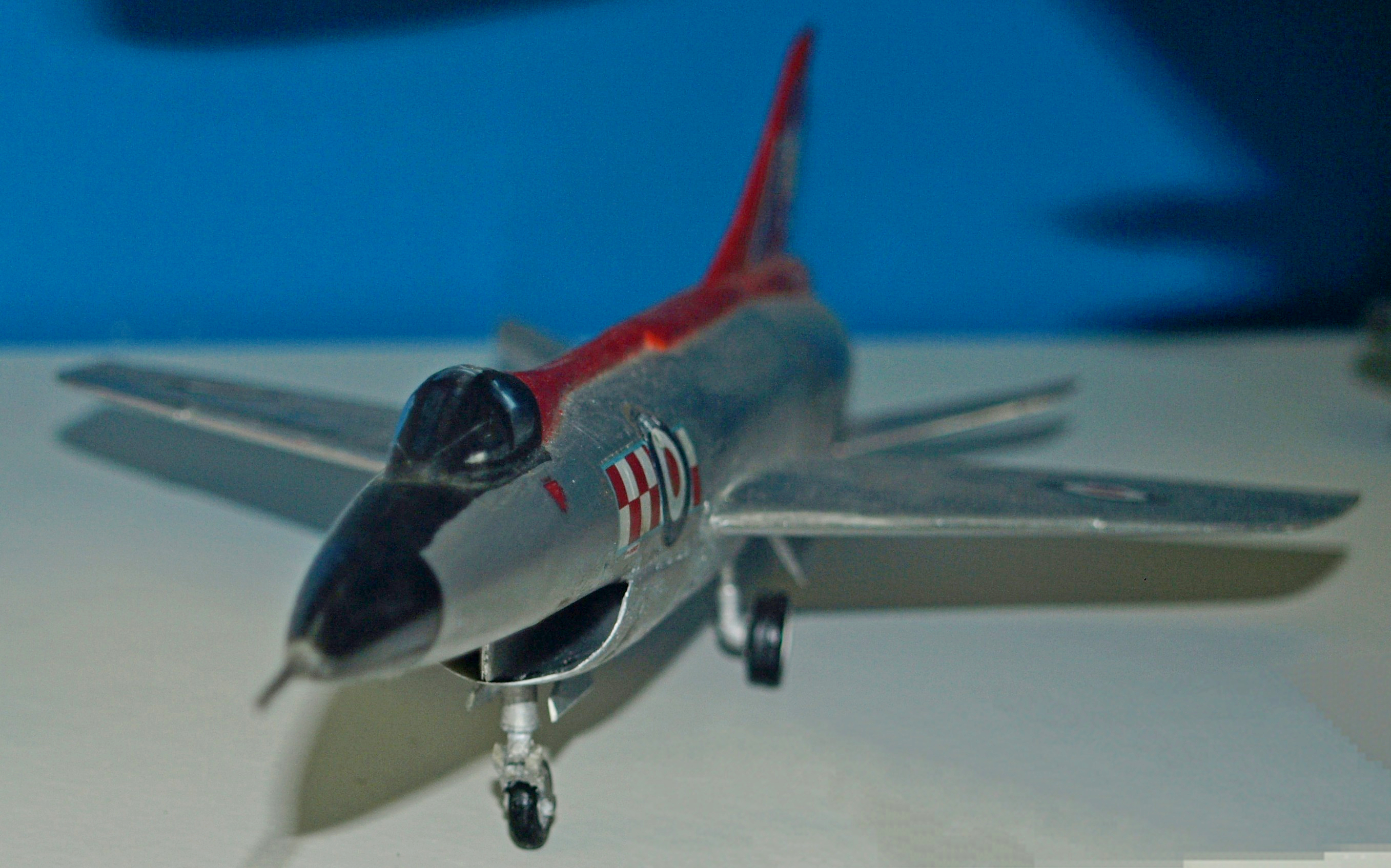
- Hawker P.1121 model on display at the Midland Air Museum.

General information
- Type: Fighter aircraft
- Manufacturer: Hawker Siddeley
- Status: Cancelled

The Hawker P.1121 was a British supersonic fighter aircraft designed, but never fully completed, by Hawker Siddeley during the mid-1950s. It was designed by a team headed by Sir Sydney Camm.

The P.1121 was initially funded as a private venture by Hawker Siddeley, with the aim of producing an aircraft that conformed with the requirements of Operational Requirement 339 (OR.339) by the UK Air Ministry.

In 1958, all work was stopped, shortly following the publication of the infamous 1957 Defence White Paper by Minister of Defence Duncan Sandys, which had called for manned fighter aircraft to be phased out and replaced with guided missiles.

== Development ==
In March 1954, Hawker decided to embark on the development of a new fighter aircraft in response to the release of Operational Requirement 323 (OR.323) by the Air Ministry. This initial design, designated as the P.1103, was a twin-seat swept wing aircraft powered by the de Havilland Gyron turbojet engine and armed with two sizeable Red Dean air-to-air missiles. The proposed design was reworked the following year when, in February 1955, the Ministry issued OR.329, which, amongst other requirements, called for a large 40-inch (100 cm) sweep-scanning radar unit, AI.18, to be installed. In October 1955, Hawker decided to tender its revised P.1103 proposal for the requirement, notably offering the Red Hebe missile as an alternative to Red Dean.

In 1956, Air Marshal Thomas Pike, the Deputy Chief of the Air Force, approached Sidney Camm, the lead designer of the P.1103, to air his suggestion that the proposed aircraft might be reasonably adopted to perform as a combined long-range interceptor and ground attack platform, which could include the potential utilisation of nuclear weapons. Camm, who found the suggestion to be favourable with his thinking, promptly directed his team to design a twin-seat strike derivative of the P.1103, which was soon given the designation P.1116; a similar single-seat proposal was also prepared, designated P.1121.

In terms of specifications, capacities and performance, the proposed P.1121 was similar to the American McDonnell Douglas F-4 Phantom II, which was at that point also under development, both aircraft possessing comparable performance and load carrying capacity. According to Hawker's own summary within the presented proposal, the P.1121 was promoted as being ready for production as early as 1960, and was to have been capable of speeds of up to Mach 2.5. Promoted elements of the design included its high speed, large internal fuel capacity, provision for a wide range of munitions and equipment, and being strengthened for a full range of ground attack profiles. Hawker promoted in detail the long-term development potential of the P.1121 to the RAF.

In addition to the Mach 2.5 design, Hawker also carried out initial design work upon an even faster version of the P.1121. This model, which was projected to be capable of Mach 3, was to be outfitted with a steel wing along with an uprated engine in order to achieve this increase. Multiple radical proposals, such a version which would have utilised a combination of both rocket and jet propulsion, had also mooted for the type. In May 1957, Camm produced a rough draft of a twin-engined version of the aircraft, designated as the P.1125, which was to have been powered by a pair of Rolls-Royce RB.133 engines. While the prototype would be furnished with a Gyron P.S.26-6 model capable of 17,400 lbf (77 kN) thrust (23,800 lbf (106 kN) with reheat), production aircraft had been envisioned to make use of the more powerful P.S.26-3 engine, capable of 20,000 lbf (89 kN) thrust (27,000 lbf (120 kN) with reheat). The Gyron engine would have provided the P.1121 with a relatively quick time-to-altitude and interception performance in comparison to contemporary fighters.

By September 1957, at which point the infamous 1957 Defence White Paper was published, work had progressed to an advanced stage on the P.1121 project. While OR.329 was cancelled, it was recognised that the design could be reworked to meet OR.339, which was by then the only-remaining long term manned aircraft requirement left to contend for. During October 1957, shortly after the receipt of OR.339 that month, it was determined that an enlarged version of the P.1125 proposal was the most likely candidate to meet the requirements, thus, in January 1958, it was submitted as the P.1129, powered by a pair of Rolls-Royce RB.141 engines.

On 25 June 1959, the Defence Research Policy Committee approved funds for OR.339, at which point Hawker Siddeley's management directed that a re-submission be made. Accordingly, Camm produced a modified P.1129 proposal, which drew on improvements featured on a competing design by Avro. By Summer 1958, the major assemblies for the P.1121 had been completed along with extensive wind tunnel testing, most of the system trials had also been completed. However, the Hawker Siddeley board decided to slow development on the project, being unwilling to self-finance its final completion along with its maiden flight, pending upon the outcome of OR.339. Thus, the nearly complete aircraft remained in Hawker's Kingston facility effectively due to lack of funding.

In January 1959, it was announced that a competing submission by Vickers and English Electric had been awarded the contract for OR.339, which effectively signalled the demise of P.1121. The company's board saw no value in pursuing development against government favour. While efforts were made during 1960 to revive the P.1121 programme, by this point development of the Gyron engine that was to power it had already been terminated as well. The aircraft had failed to be selected due to the Air Staff having been unable to understand the concept of the multi-purpose functionality of the aircraft, which would become commonplace on later aircraft. While seeking a new project to take the place of the P.1121, Camm soon began work upon another new and radical aircraft design, designated as the Hawker Siddeley P.1127. The P.1127 would become the Hawker Siddeley Harrier, the first effective vertical take-off and landing (VTOL) combat aircraft.

== Design ==
The Hawker P.1121 was envisioned as being one of the first British-built supersonic fighter aircraft, being projected to be capable of speeds of up to Mach 2.5. It was to have been used not only as a radar-equipped interceptor aircraft but also ground attack missions, which was envisaged to potentially include tactical nuclear weapons. If pursued, the P.1121 would have replaced existing RAF transonic aircraft, such as the Hawker Hunter. While initial models were envisioned to be single-seat aircraft, Hawker emphasized that twin-seat versions, to seat a navigator/radar operator, were plausible.

The P.1121 was to be powered by a single de Havilland Gyron turbojet engine; Camm chose the Gyron engine to power the type as at the time it had been determined to be the only suitable powerplant that was available. Alternative powerplants were evaluated for potential use, including the Rolls-Royce Olympus turbojet engine and the Rolls-Royce Conway turbofan engine, the latter being the first available turbofan engine in the world. According to Wood, the Olympus engine provided the best compromise on paper, capable of an equal strike range to the Conway while delivering similar speed and altitude performance to the Gyron engine. Airflow would have been provided to the relatively large engine via a large fully variable 'shark-mouth' style intake positioned beneath the aircraft's fuselage.

Conventional construction was employed throughout the majority of the P.1121; using a thick lightweight alloy skin placed on top of tightly spaced frames and stringers, while steel was used for some highly stressed components. The fuselage was split into three major sections; the front fuselage contained the radome, cockpit, radio, and equipment bay, the centre section housed the engine, air intake, belly-mounted air brake, nosewheel, 2-inch (51 mm) rocket launching fixtures, and a total of five nylon bag fuel tanks. The rear fuselage section was occupied by the reheat pipe, final nozzle, the main undercarriage a pair of rear air brakes, and two further bag-type fuel tanks. The P.1121 was furnished with a four-spar wing, covered by a 0.3-inch (7.6 mm) thick alloy skin, which was similarly shaped to the wing of the preceding Hawker Hunter. The spars were attached to steel booms at the inboard end, which were in turn fixed onto the four main frames of the centre fuselage section. The structural box of the wing also contained an integral fuel tank, containing up to 420 imperial gallons (1,900 L) of fuel in addition to the 1,055 imperial gallons (4,800 L) held within the fuselage fuel tanks. Up to four additional underwing external fuel tanks could also be fitted if required.

The flying controls of the P.1121 were designed as a fully integrated system which enabled power to be entirely duplicated across the control surfaces. The weapon system was to be initially based on the Ferranti AI.23 radar unit, however Hawker had envisaged adopting a GEC-built J-band radar, to be capable of a 35 nautical miles (65 km) search range, and further radar improvements were projected beyond this, as well as the use of new semi-active radar-guided air-to-air missiles developed by Fairey. A fully integrated power control system with autopilot functionality and Doppler navigation was to assist in performing low-altitude bombing runs using both conventional and nuclear armaments. Various upgrades and modifications for the base P.1121 design were proposed. Sideways-looking radar, the equipment for which to be installed upon underwing pylons, was promoted as an available option for the type; a forward-looking radar could also replace the standard AI radar unit for improved strike performance. The P.1121 could have also been used in the Electronic countermeasures (ECM) role, being fitted with underwing pods to do so. A centrally mounted fuel/bomb cell was also conceived of, which would have provided a total fuel capacity of 3,000 imperial gallons (14,000 L). Upon customer request, it could have been outfitted with 30mm ADEN cannons as well.

== See also ==
Related development

- Hawker P.1103

Aircraft of comparable role, configuration, and era

- Nord 1500 Griffon
