= Saunders-Roe SR.177 =

1950s British cancelled interceptor aircraft project

SR.177
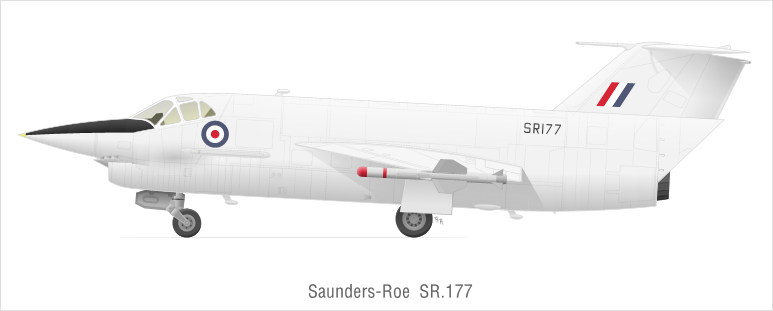
- SR.177 with Hawker Siddeley Red Top missiles

General information
- Type: Mixed power interceptor
- Manufacturer: Saunders-Roe
- Designer: Maurice Brennan
- Number built: 0

History
- Developed from: Saunders-Roe SR.53

The Saunders-Roe SR.177 was a 1950s project to develop a combined jet- and rocket-powered interceptor aircraft for the Royal Air Force (RAF) and Royal Navy. It was an enlarged derivative of the Saunders-Roe SR.53, which was itself an experimental combined jet-and-rocket interceptor aircraft.

The SR.177 principally differed from the smaller SR.53 in its adoption of a nose-mounted aircraft interception radar unit, which allowed it to scan for and lock onto its own targets; a more powerful turbojet engine was also incorporated. In addition to British interests in the aircraft, the German Navy had also expressed their interest in the project and closely evaluated its progress with an eye towards its potential procurement. However, the SR.177 was ultimately cancelled as a result of changes in Britain's military policies in 1957.

A much larger derivative of the SR.177 had been studied, which was designated as the SR.187, and was being developed with the intention of meeting the requirements of Operational Requirement F.155. However, this work was also cancelled in 1957. By the time of termination, approximately 90 per cent of the first prototype had been completed, while several other prototypes were in various states of completion. The prototypes were stored for several years while attempts were made to revive the project; while interest was present, including from Japan, nothing more came of the project and the remaining assets were broken up.

== Design and development ==
=== Background ===
In 1952, Saunders-Roe had been awarded a contract to develop a combined rocket-and-jet-propelled interceptor aircraft, which was designated as the Saunders-Roe SR.53. However, as development work on the project progressed, the shortcomings of the design became increasingly evident. Most particularly, as with the German rocket-powered interceptors of the Second World War, the range and endurance of such an aircraft were limited by the high rate of fuel consumption by the rocket engine. However, as turbojet engines developed and became increasingly powerful and efficient, new powerplants were quickly becoming available that would make such aircraft more practical.

Maurice Brennan, the chief designer of the SR.53, had also become convinced of the necessity for an airborne radar unit to be carried by the aircraft, as the SR.53 was reliant upon on ground-based radar guidance and the pilot's own vision to intercept aircraft. In particular, it was feared that pilots would be unable to focus their eyes properly at the 60,000 feet (18,000 m) altitude that the SR.53 was capable of. Out of a combined desire to equip the aircraft with a radar unit and to make greater use of turbojet power, a more ambitious design began to be drawn up. While it had begun as an advanced design concept for the SR.53, upon the issuing of a development contract by the Ministry of Defence in May 1955 (to meet specification F.155), the project was given its own designation as the SR.177.

As work continued on the SR.53, a separate High Speed Development Section was formed by Saunders-Roe to work on the SR.177. Initially, the SR.177 was a straightforward development of the SR.53, sharing much of the same configuration and equipment, and it was envisioned that the first test flight would take place during the first half of 1957. However, in February 1955, an extensive redesign of the SR.177, with the aim of making the type suitable for use by both the RAF and the Royal Navy, was commenced. Of the changes made to the aircraft, major differences included the repositioning of the jet engine to the lower fuselage lobe, which was now fed with air via a large, chin-mounted intake; the wing was also enlarged and blown flaps were adopted. The turbojet engine selected was the de Havilland Gyron Junior, capable of generating 8,000 lbf (36,000 N) of thrust.

=== Project launch ===
In September 1955, Saunders-Roe received instructions to proceed on the SR.177 from the British Ministry of Supply. The Ministry also gave instruction for the production of mock-ups, windtunnel tests, and the development of construction jigs for the manufacture of an initial batch of aircraft. From the onset, the SR.177 faced competition in the form of an enlarged derivative of the Avro 720, which had itself been devised as a competitor against the smaller SR.53. Avro promoted the 720 to the Royal Navy, hoping to win favour away from the SR.177, which had by this point reached the detail design phase. The Ministry ultimately opted to cancel all work on the Avro 720, primarily as a cost-saving measure, as well as to concentrate development work on HTP-based rocket motors, such as those powering the SR.53 and SR.177.

The most significant difference between the SR.53 and SR.177 was the latter's use of a jet engine with nearly five times the thrust of the one adopted for the former. While the SR.53 had relied mostly on its rocket engine for climbing, the SR.177 would be able to add considerable endurance by conserving use of its rocket for the dash towards a target only. It was expected that the added endurance would allow the SR.177 to perform roles other than pure interception; these roles were expected to include strike and reconnaissance missions. The SR.53 design had been considerably enlarged to accommodate the new engine, and the original sleek lines were forfeited for the chin-mounted air intake.

Following the maiden flight of the SR.53 in May 1957, the development of the SR.177 became the main focus of activity at Saunders-Roe. At this point, the project was viewed as having considerable large scale potential, as both the RAF and Royal Navy appeared to be set to be customers for the SR.177. The RAF sought to operate it alongside the incoming English Electric Lightning interceptors while, according to aviation author Derek Wood, the Royal Navy also had considerable interest in the programme. When the development contract had been issued in May 1955, it reflected this dual interest. The Navy's requirements were defined in NA.47 while the RAF's requirements were specified in OR.337, which had been issued by the Ministry of Supply as Operational Requirement F.155. There was optimism that a joint aircraft for the two services could be developed, saving considerable expense, time, and effort.

Negotiations on the exact number of aircraft sought by either service were protracted; but it had been established that there was demand for an initial batch of 27 SR.177 aircraft, and that sufficient tooling should be produced to enable the programme to transition rapidly to full-rate production. By April 1956, a consensus had emerged that, in order for the first five SR.177s to be completed by January 1958, these aircraft would be produced without any A.I. radar or the ability to support armaments. In July 1956, funding was secured for 27 aircraft to be produced, the first of which being expected to fly by April (later postponed to October) 1958. On 4 September 1956, a formal contract for the 27 aircraft was issued, which was sub-divided into four batches of five, four, four, and fourteen respectively, although the final eighteen were subject to evaluation and were thus pending confirmation. During 1957, a development contract for the SR.177 was announced for its use with the Royal Navy.

By January 1957, the design of the main component jigs was 70 per cent complete while the component assembly jigs were almost 50 per cent complete; the manufacture of a quantity production batch was nearing, which would have likely been subcontracted to another aviation company due to the high level of workload at Saunders-Roe's Cowes facility. Armstrong Whitworth, who had already taken over work on the basic wing design of the SR.177, had been selected as the second production outlet for the type. The selection of a production center for the SR.177 was complicated by a favourable event; interest in the programme from the West German government. Since 1955, the revived German Air Force had sought a suitable high performance aircraft to equip itself with, and there were hopes that the SR.177 could become the foundation of a collaborative European fighter programme.

The German Defence Ministry had first expressed interest in the SR.177 in October 1955; in February 1956, the British Government Committee on Security consented to discussions being held on the SR.177. The prospects of a large German order for as many as 200 aircraft, and for the SR.177 to be manufactured under licence in Germany by the recovering German aircraft industry, were soon being aired, of which the British government declared its openness towards. In January 1957, the Anglo-German Standing Committee on Arms Supply reported that General Kammhuber, the Commander-in-Chief of the German Air Force, was concerned that, due to a lack of available financing until April 1958, the delivery timetable may not be satisfactory. According to Wood, Germany was keen to issue an order as soon as possible by this point.

=== Decline and cancellation ===
During 1957, the fate of the SR.177 was to be subject to a massive re-thinking of air defence philosophy in Britain, being principally outlined in the 1957 Defence White Paper, which called for crewed combat aircraft to be replaced by missiles. Very shortly afterwards, OR.337 was cancelled and the prospects of an order from the RAF had evaporated. This was a serious blow, while it the Royal Navy and Germany remained potential customers for the SR.177, the confidence of both parties was shaken by the move.

Work on the SR.177 continued for a little longer, however, in the anticipation of continued interest from Germany. In September 1957, Aubrey Jones, the Minister of Supply, was keen to support the programme and had agreed to continue funding development of five of the six prototypes. However, according to Wood, the SR.177 was subject to political in-fighting between Aubrey Jones and Duncan Sandys, the minister who had been the prime advocate of the Defence White Paper. While Jones assured German officials that the SR.177 project was continuing, Sandys contacted them to inform them that the aircraft was effectively dead. These mixed messages led to considerable confusion and apprehension within the German Defence Ministry. Further difficulty was added when, in response to lobbying by Rolls-Royce Limited, the German government insisted that the Rolls-Royce RB.153 engine be used in place of the Gyron Junior, causing Saunders-Roe to work on a further hasty redesign of SR.177.

The German government also decided to change its priorities from seeking an interceptor aircraft to acquiring a strike fighter instead, leading Saunders-Roe to redesign the aircraft for this role. However, even with Heinkel preparing to manufacture the SR.177 locally under licence, Germany chose to withdraw support from the venture in December 1957. The Minister had visited the German government in November 1957 as the Germans wanted the arrangements to be between governments instead of between their government and Saunders-Roe.

Of the remaining aircraft under consideration, the West German Government chose to purchase a development of the American Lockheed F-104 Starfighter interceptor instead to meet the role of "high-altitude reconnaissance machine, a tactical fighter-bomber, and an all-weather fighter", along with the majority of European governments. This Lockheed coup, known as the "Deal of the Century", caused major political controversy in Europe and the West German Minister of Defence Franz Josef Strauss was almost forced to resign over the issue. During later investigation into Lockheed's business practices, it was discovered that Lockheed had paid out millions of dollars in "sales incentives" in each of these countries in order to secure the deal. Prince Bernhard of the Netherlands confessed to taking more than one million dollars in bribes from Lockheed to buy the F-104.

Following the withdrawal of German interest and there being no requirement for the SR.177 by the RAF, the existing Royal Navy requirement was considered not worthwhile to proceed with. Accordingly, the Ministry of Supply soon chose to cancel the project. On 24 December 1957, a letter from the Ministry was received by Saunders-Roe, announcing the decision to terminate. Saunders-Roe announced that it expected to make 1,000 workers redundant as a result of the termination. As the jigs and near-complete aircraft was disassembled during the New Year, it was decided that the aircraft assemblies themselves should be stored in the event of the project being revived.

In 1958, the SR.177 received one last burst of interest when Japan, which was interested in developing a rocket-jet fighter itself, approached Britain with a request for quotations for the purchase of the two prototype SR.53s along with the completion of two SR.177s. However, due to a lack of backing from the British government, this initiative did not come to anything; the Japanese ultimately turned to the F-104 as well. Woods summarises the cancellation of the SR.177 as: "...it could ultimately have been built in hundreds or thousands. Due to ridiculous defence policies and a complete lack of Whitehall inter-departmental collaboration in the technology field, one of the most promising projects in a decade was destroyed".

== Specifications (SR.177 estimated) ==
Data from

General characteristics

- Wingspan: 30 ft 3 in (9.22 m) with missiles, 27.12 ft (8.27 m) without missiles
- Height: 14 ft 3.5 in (4.356 m)
- Wing area: 327 sq ft (30.4 m^{2})
- Empty weight: 14,533 lb (6,592 kg)
- Gross weight: 25,786 lb (11,696 kg) (normal warning)
- Max takeoff weight: 28,174 lb (12,780 kg) (extended warning)
- Powerplant: 1 × de Havilland PS.50 Gyron Junior turbojet with afterburner, 14,000 lbf (62 kN) thrust
- Powerplant: 1 × de Havilland Spectre 5A liquid-fuelled rocket engine, 10,000 lbf (44 kN) thrust

Performance

- Maximum speed: Mach 2.35
- Service ceiling: 67,000 ft (20,000 m)
- Rate of climb: 60,000 ft/min (300 m/s)
- Time to altitude:
  - brake release to 20,000 ft (6,100 m) - 1 min 27 s
  - brake release to 40,000 ft (12,000 m) - 2 min 3 s
  - brake release to 60,000 ft (18,000 m) - 3 min 6 s
  - brake release to 70,000 ft (21,000 m) - 3 min 51 s
- Level acceleration at 80,000 ft (24,000 m) from top of climb at Mach 1.4 to Mach 2 - 1 min 6 s
- Radius of turn (at Mach 1•6 at 60,000 ft (18,000 m)) - 24,000 ft (7,300 m)
- Rocket full power endurance - 7 minutes

Armament

- Hardpoints: 2 with a capacity of 1,000 lb (450 kg)
- Missiles:
  - Initially 2 x de Havilland Firestreak air-to-air missiles
  - Later 2 x Hawker Siddeley Red Top (Firestreak Mark 4)

Avionics
AI.23 aircraft interception radar

== See also ==
Related development

- SR.53
- SR.187

Aircraft of comparable role, configuration, and era

- Nord 1500 Griffon
- Republic XF-91 Thunderceptor
- SNCASO Trident
