= Vickers Type 559 =

1950s British interceptor aircraft design

Type 559
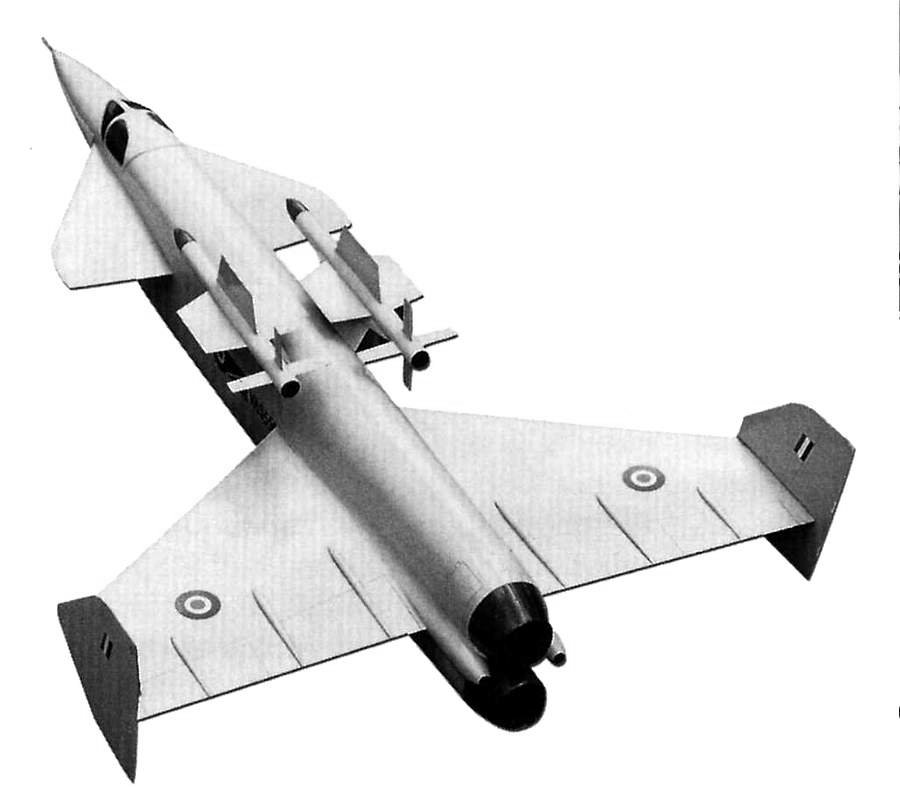

General information
- Type: Interceptor
- Manufacturer: Vickers-Armstrongs
- Number built: None

The Vickers Type 559 was a supersonic interceptor aircraft design by the British aircraft company Vickers-Armstrongs and was their submission for Operational Requirement F.155 in 1955.

It was not accepted for further consideration; the most valued submissions being from Armstrong Whitworth and Fairey, however the F.155 requirement was dropped as a result of the 1957 Defence White Paper.

== Design and development ==
The Type 559 was an unorthodox canard design with a massive chin air intake, split vertically, for two reheated de Havilland Gyron engines of 20,000 pounds-force (89 kN) thrust each, placed one above the other, similar to the English Electric Lightning. Two de Havilland Spectre Junior rockets were situated, one on each side of the fuselage at wing level. Two Red Hebe or Blue Jay missiles were mounted alongside the upper part of the fuselage between the canard and the mainplane, which had endplates incorporating twin rudders.

== Specifications ==
Data from Supermarine Aircraft since 1914

General characteristics

- Crew: 1
- Length: 68 ft 3 in (20.80 m)
- Wingspan: 42 ft 0 in (12.80 m)
- Height: 15 ft 3 in (4.65 m)
- Wing area: 615 sq ft (57.1 m^{2})
- Empty weight: 41,485 lb (18,817 kg)
- Gross weight: 62,190 lb (28,209 kg)
- Powerplant: 2 × de Havilland Gyron PS.26/1 afterburning turbojet engines, 20,000 lbf (89 kN) thrust each dry, 27,000 lbf (120 kN) with afterburner
- Powerplant: 2 × De Havilland Spectre Junior Kerosene/High-test peroxide rocket motor, 5,000 lbf (22 kN) thrust each

Performance

- Maximum speed: Mach 2.5
- Combat range: 150 mi (240 km, 130 nmi)
- Endurance: 32 minutes
- Service ceiling: 60,000 ft (18,000 m) specified by F.155

Armament

- Missiles: 2 × Red Hebe (radar guided) or Blue Jay (heat-seeking) missiles
