= Maurice Brennan =

British aerospace engineer

- Born: April 1913; Muswell Hill
- Died: 18 January 1986 (aged 72); Isle of Wight
- Education: St. Mungo's Academy, Glasgow University
- Engineering career
- Discipline: Aerospace
- Institutions: Royal Aeronautical Society
- Projects: SR.53, Black Knight
- Significant advance: SR.N1 Hovercraft

Maurice Joseph Brennan BSC, MIMechE, FRAes (April 1913 – 18 January 1986) was a British aerospace engineer. His career encompassed the design and development of flying boats before the Second World War to rocket powered fighters after. He had a significant role in Britain's first indigenous rocket project (Black Knight) and in the development of practical hovercraft (SR.N1)

== Career ==
Maurice Brennan was born in April 1913, at Muswell Hill, London. He was educated in Scotland, first at St. Mungo's Academy then at Glasgow University. He qualified for his pilots "A" licence in 1931. After graduating from Glasgow in April 1934, he joined the technical office of Hawker Aircraft, Ltd in Kingston, where he remained until 1936, when he went to work for Saunders-Roe.

At Saunders-Roe he was engaged in the stress office, the aerodynamics office and the project office. In this period his design responsibilities included the Saro Lerwick and the Short Shetland flying boats. From 1947, he was technical assistant to the chief executive, Sir Arthur Gouge. In January 1947 Brennan took charge of helicopter development when Saunders-Roe took over the development contract on the Cierva W.14 Skeeter and Cierva Air Horse helicopters. He became chief designer in October 1953, and among his responsibilities were the Saunders Roe Princess flying boat, the SR.53 and SR.177 mixed (rocket and jet)-powered interceptor fighters and the Black Knight programme. He also led the detail design of the SR.N1 hovercraft, working closely with Christopher Cockerell.

He resigned from Saunders-Roe in March 1959 to work for Vickers Armstrong in Weybridge. This was three days after the chief rocket development engineer, Mr Paul Layton, resigned "as a protest against Britain's lack of a space exploration policy", although Brennan said at the time his resignation was unconnected with Layton's. At Vickers Armstrong he was the assistant chief engineer working with Barnes Wallis on variable-geometry aircraft projects that would eventually become the basis of the AFVG project. However, he resigned again after ten months, joining Folland in 1960, replacing Teddy Petter as director and chief engineer. By this time Folland was part of Hawker Siddeley, and he was responsible for developing the two-seat Gnat T.1, various twin engined and variable wing geometry Gnat proposals and the GERM hovercraft project (Ground Effect Research Machine).

In 1961 he moved to Avro (also part of Hawker Siddeley) succeeding Roy Ewans as a director and chief engineer. From 1961 to 1969 his responsibilities included the Avro 748, its derivative the Hawker Siddeley Andover and the Hawker Siddeley Nimrod. Later Brennan became director of special projects with responsibility for V/STOL military and civil designs.

In the late 1970s and early 1980s he was Technical Director of Aircraft Designs with Sheriff Aerospace. He died in 1986 on the Isle of Wight.

== Patents ==
- GB 824560, Brennan, Maurice Joseph, "Aircraft", published 2 December 1959, assigned to Saunders-Roe
- CA 636162, Brennan, Maurice Joseph, "AEROPLANE WITH DEVICE TO COUNTERACT PITCHING MOMENTS ON LANDING", published 6 February 1962, assigned to Vickers Armstrong Aircraft Ltd
- GB 910792, Brennan, Maurice Joseph, "Improvements in aeroplane having wings adjustable in sweep", published 21 November 1962, assigned to Vickers Armstrong Aircraft Ltd
- GB 951330, Brennan, Maurice Joseph, "Improvement in aeroplanes", published 4 March 1964, assigned to Vickers Armstrong Aircraft Ltd
