= Saunders-Roe SR.53 =

Interceptor aircraft in the Royal Air Force

SR.53
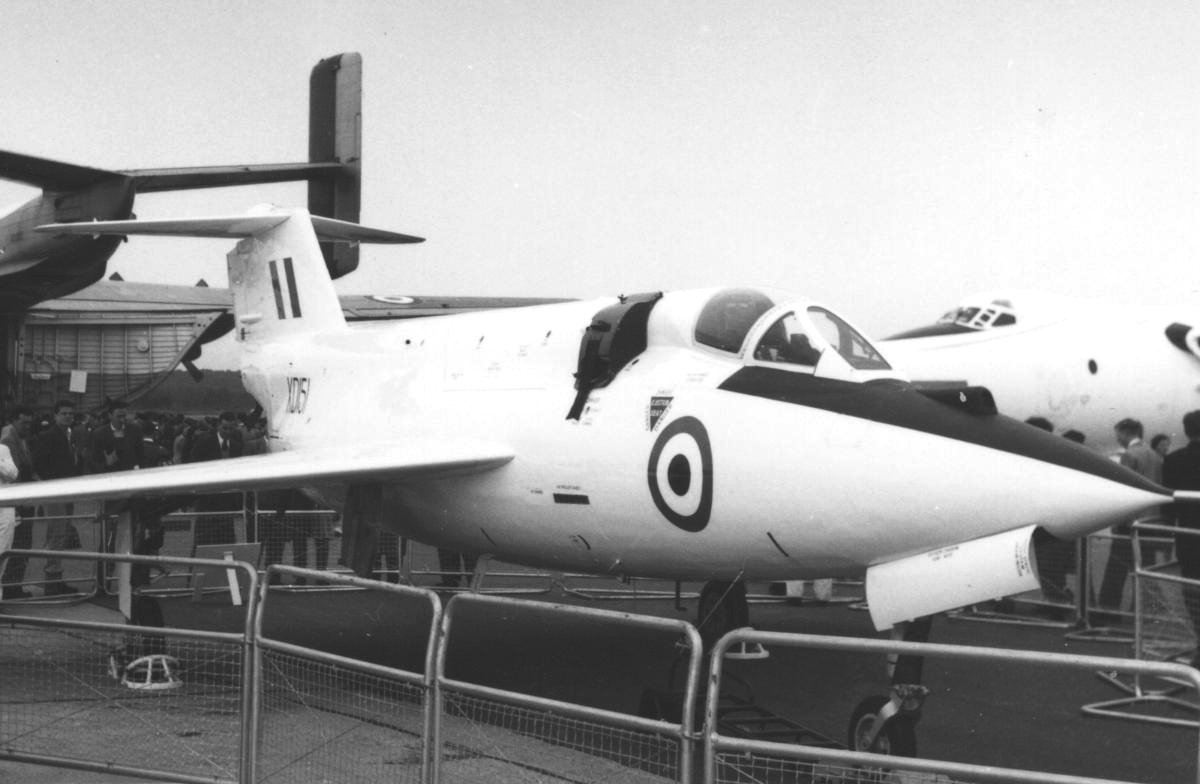
- The second SR.53 on display at the September 1957 Farnborough Air Show

General information
- Type: Interceptor
- Manufacturer: Saunders-Roe
- Designer: Maurice Brennan
- Status: Experimental
- Primary user: United Kingdom
- Number built: 2

History
- First flight: 16 May 1957
- Variant: Saunders-Roe SR.177

The Saunders-Roe SR.53 was a British prototype interceptor aircraft of mixed jet and rocket propulsion developed for the Royal Air Force (RAF) by Saunders-Roe in the early 1950s. As envisaged, the SR.53 would have been used as an interceptor aircraft, using its rocket propulsion to rapidly climb and approach incoming hostile bombers at high speeds; following its attack run, the aircraft would then return to its base using jet propulsion.

Although the SR.53 proved to have promising performance during test flights, the requirement for such an aircraft had been overtaken by rapid advances in surface-to-air missile technology, leading to reconsideration of the aircraft's purpose. In July 1960, the development programme was formally cancelled, by which time a total of 56 test flights had been performed. A pair of prototype SR.53 aircraft had been completed and used during flight tests. The second prototype was destroyed during one such test flight in June 1958. The first prototype has been preserved to this day. It rests on public display at the Royal Air Force Museum Cosford.

== Design and development ==
=== Background ===
The Second World War had demonstrated the importance of strategic bombing to modern warfare, and as the emerging Cold War developed, the development of new and more effective air defences against large waves of hostile bomber aircraft armed with nuclear weapons became a priority for many nations. During the war, Nazi Germany had extensively developed its own rocket-powered aircraft to augment its interception capabilities, in the final two years of the war, it had been able to deploy aircraft such as the Messerschmitt Me 163 and Bachem Ba 349 which, via rocket propulsion, had been capable of unparalleled rates-of-climb, enabling them to (at least in theory) rapidly sortie to intercept enemy bombers before they reached their targets. As the performance of these aircraft had become increasingly well known to the Allies, RAF experts were eager to explore and understand the underlying technology.

In the aftermath of the war, German rocket technology was studied extensively by various members of the former Allied nations. Britain had quickly opted to commence a programme to develop liquid-propellant rockets with the aim of boosting aircraft during the take-off phase, known within the RAF as rocket-assisted take-off gear (RATOG), and during the climb-to-altitude phase of flight. In 1946, work began on a pair of new British-built rocket motors, the de Havilland Sprite with a maximum thrust of 22 kN (5,000 lbf) and the Armstrong Siddeley Snarler with 8.9 kN (2,000 lbf) of thrust; these rocket motors made use of different propellants, the Sprite used a high-test peroxide (HTP) monopropellant while the Snarler harnessed a methanol/water/liquid oxygen mix. During the early 1950s, both engines proceeded to the flight testing phase; however, some of the demand for their role to provide fighters with increased performance was soon being met by the increasing prevalence of conventional jet engines being equipped with reheat instead.

In May 1951, faced with reports on the increasingly potential capability of, and thus the threat posed by, the growing Soviet strategic bomber fleet and that nation's newly developed atomic weapons, the British Air Ministry proceeded to draft an Operational Requirement, OR 301, which sought a rocket-powered interceptor that could attain an altitude of 18,000 metres (60,000 ft) in just 2 minutes 30 seconds. Many of the performance requirement laid out by OR 301 was due to the anticipation of rapid increases in performance by the opposing Soviet aircraft; by the early 1960s, it was suspected that these bombers might well be capable of supersonic speeds of up to Mach 2 with a potential operational altitude as high as 24,000 metres (80,000 ft). Accordingly, a capable defence interceptor that could form part of the nation's measures to counter this threat would need to be capable of similar speeds and an exceptionally high rate of climb in order to reach high altitude bombers in time.

The development of the Sprite and the Snarler had led to the possibility of a more powerful rocket engine being developed as the planned powerplant for a viable "point defence" interceptor. The requirements of O.R. 301 were considered onerous, including a ramp launch and landing on a skid, and with the compliance of the companies which had approached to tender, the amended Specification F124T allowed for a mixed powerplant configuration along with the adoption of a conventional undercarriage. On 21 February 1951, the revised Specification F124T was circulated to half a dozen of Britain's various aircraft manufacturers to solicit their submissions.

=== Submissions and selection ===
Saunders-Roe had not been one of the companies who received the Specification; this is likely due to the Ministry of Supply not considering them to be relevant, as the firm had typically been involved in the production of flying boats. However, Saunders-Roe was in fact interested in the new requirement, having been already independently conducting studies into high-altitude and high-speed flight. Maurice Brennan, the company's chief designer, had already directed members of the design team to study the prospects of rocket-propelled aircraft capable of flying at altitudes of up to 30,000 metres (100,000 ft) and had published a report entitled 'Investigation of Problems of Pure Rocket Fighter Aircraft' at the same time that the Ministry had issued Specification F124T. Saunders-Roe approached the Ministry on its failure to follow conventional policy in not dispatching the specification nor an invitation to tender to the firm; as a result, on 24 March 1951, the Ministry asked the company to submit its designs alongside the other competitors.

By the end of April 1951, Saunders-Roe submitted their detailed proposal. The proposed single-seat aircraft, designated as the SR.53, was capable of very high speeds, being projected as being capable of a top speed of Mach 2.44 (2,592 km/h; 1,611 mph) when at an altitude of 18,000 metres (60,000 ft), and a rate of climb of 16,000 metres (52,000 ft) per minute around an altitude of 15,000 metres (50,000 ft). An auxiliary disposable undercarriage could be used for takeoffs, along with cordite-based booster rockets. In the event of an emergency, the entire cabin would have originally been jettisoned as a means of providing the pilot with a means of escape; due to the work involved in developing this, it was instead replaced by a more standard ejection seat arrangement. The firm had quickly identified that the original unpowered 'glide home' approach would be dangerous and expensive; they approached the Air Ministry with their concept of a secondary jet engine for the purposes of powering the aircraft's journey home. The Ministry was enthusiastic on this concept; in May 1951, all interested companies were asked to examine this arrangement.

The SR.53 was a sleek aircraft with a sharply-pointed nose, delta-like wing, and a T-tail. It was powered by a combination of a single Armstrong Siddeley Viper turbojet engine and de Havilland Spectre rocket engine, the exhausts of which were mounted one atop the other on the rear fuselage beneath the tail. Saunders-Roe had originally proposed to develop their own rocket motor to power the SR.53, having not been initially pleased with the performance of either the Spectre nor the Screamer; however, it was recognised that this would take substantial development work. By October 1952, the basic outline of the aircraft had been finalised, replacing the combined flap and ailerons of earlier proposed with slotted flaps, the Viper engine was relocated upwards and was to be fitted with a straight jet pipe rather than a bifurcated one, the tailplane was also moved to a higher position at the top of the fin.

On 30 October 1952, the company received an Instruction to Proceed from the Ministry for the completion of three prototypes. On 12 December 1952, further refinement of the concept led to the release of the defined Specification OR 337. The changes of the defined specification mainly revolved around armament changes, adopting the Blue Jay infrared-guided air-to-air missile, which replaced the originally-envisaged retractable battery of 51-millimetre (2 in) rockets. During the first four months of 1953, Saunders-Roe had to perform a structural redesign of the SR.53's fuselage, wing, and undercarriage due to a determination by the Royal Aircraft Establishment (RAE) that the wing required a greater anhedral angle than had originally been designed for.

On 5 May 1953, an advisory design conference was hosted at the Ministry of Supply focusing on the SR.53; three days later, a formal contract for the production of the three prototypes was received. Due to doubts within the RAF and the Ministry over the correct fuel/motor to select for the aircraft in order to meet the Specification, it was decided to issue a modified specification, and later a development contract, to A.V. Roe, who commenced work on their own rocket-powered interceptor, designated as the Avro 720. Of the six companies that tendered proposals, two were selected for development contracts: A.V. Roe with their Avro 720 and Saunders-Roe with the SR.53.

=== Issues and proposals ===
Saunders-Roe, recognising that it would need to outdo the competing Avro 720 if the SR.53 was to be likely to survive, upon having been issued with the contract to build the three prototypes, set a schedule that called for a first flight to be conducted in July 1954, along with a projected service introduction date of 1957. However, Wood observes that this was far too ambitious as it did not leave time to address the complexity of the aircraft, nor did it accommodate room for delays in the supply of the separately-produced Spectre engine. Unresolved issues with elements of the design caused a series of setbacks, including one notable incident in the form of an explosion occurring during ground tests of the Spectre rocket engine. Construction of the first SR.53 prototype took longer than anticipated, in part due to de Havilland having problems delivering the Spectre engine on time, installing auxiliary equipment was also time-consuming. Accordingly, the maiden flight of the SR.53 began to fall further and further behind schedule.

The date of the first flight was first set back to March 1955, and then into 1957. Unique challenges were posed by the HTP fuel, including the development of suitable storage bags and the fuel flow proportioner. In January 1954, the Ministry reduced its order from three SR.53 prototypes to two, which were constructed side by side at Saunders-Roe's Cowes facility. Development with the competing Avro 720 proceeded more smoothly; by 1956, its prototype was virtually complete and was viewed as being capable of flying up to a year ahead of the lagging SR.53.

By September 1953, the programme to develop these aircraft came under scrutiny due to a need to implement cost cuts; as a result, the contract for the Avro 720 was eventually cancelled. One of the reasons for preferring the SR.53 was although the aircraft was developmentally behind, its use of hydrogen peroxide as an oxidiser was viewed as less problematic than the Avro 720's use of liquid oxygen, which posed a fire hazard. According to Wood, there was a preference for the HTP approach, as used by the SR.53, alongside an unwillingness to continue to support the operation of two different fuel programmes. However, the validity of this reason is undermined somewhat by the fact that Avro had been proposing to switch to using HTP and the Spectre, the same engine that was used by the SR.53. Another factor that had influenced the cancellation was the hesitancy of the RAF to back either project, the service had apparently wanted to wait until after flight evaluations had been conducted before it was to make any determination on its preference.

During late 1953, Saunders-Roe commenced work upon a derivative design, which was designated the SR.177. Brennan considered the lack of an onboard radar on the SR.53 and the Avro 720 to have been a vital flaw despite it not being a requirement of the specification, leaving the pilot dependent on his own vision and direction being provided by ground-based radar control. Brennan had also been dissatisfied with the use of the turbojet engine; he believed that a larger jet engine should match the steady supersonic cruising speed of the aircraft, and that the rocket motor should be mainly used for high performance climbs, turns, and rapid acceleration instead. Accordingly, the SR.177 was a much larger and sophisticated aircraft that would provide for more range and overall superior performance to the SR.53. It was sized to be able to carry a useful airborne radar, which Brennan had deemed to be essential for interception at the high altitudes at which the new fighter was meant to operate. The new, larger aircraft was also to be developed into separate versions for maritime use by the Royal Navy and for West Germany as well as for the RAF. Saunders-Roe worked on both the SR.53 and SR.177, the latter being worked on by a newly formed High Speed Development Section.

== Operational history ==
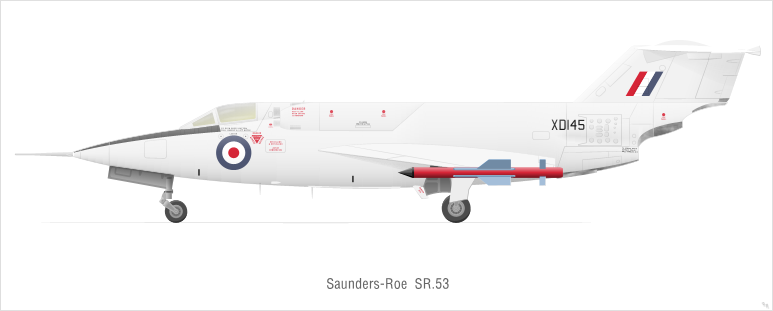
Drawing of the first SR.53

In October 1951, Saunders-Roe obtained facilities at RAF Hurn, Dorset, to support the site's use as a base for test flights of the SR.53. This measure had been necessitated by a lack of suitable airfields on the Isle of Wight, where the company was based and typically conducted development from. To this end, the firm constructed a HTP storage facility at the Hurn site; specialised radio aids were also installed and initially tested using a specially-modified Gloster Meteor which had been lent by the Ministry of Supply. This setup would ultimately remain unused as flying trials were centered at RAF Boscombe Down instead.

On 28 June 1956, the completed first prototype, XD145, was dispatched for assembly by the Aeroplane and Armament Experimental Establishment at RAF Boscombe Down. On 16 January 1957, the first installed ground run of its Spectre engine was performed; on 16 April 1957, this was followed by the first installed ground run of its Viper engine. On 9 May 1957, XD145 conducted the type's first ground taxiing trial.

On 16 May 1957, Squadron Leader John Booth DFC was at the controls of XD145 for the first test flight, following up with the maiden flight of the second prototype XD151, on 6 December 1957. Test results indicated "...an extremely docile and exceedingly pleasant aircraft to fly, with very well harmonized controls". Both prototypes flew a total of 56 test flights, with Mach 1.33 speeds being obtained.

While testing at RAE Boscombe Down, XD151 crashed on 5 June 1958 during an aborted takeoff on its 12th flight. Running off the runway, the aircraft struck a concrete approach light, exploding on impact and killing its pilot, Squadron Leader Booth. The remaining prototype continued to fly with Lt Cdr Peter Lamb taking over the flight test programme.

== Cancellation ==
It was 1957 before the first SR.53 took to the air, just over a month after the infamous 1957 Defence White Paper had been published outlining the British government's policy to largely abandon piloted aircraft in favour of concentrating on missile development. At the same time, jet engine development had progressed a long way in the six years since the SR.53's initial design. Combined with the fact that improvements in radar had meant that any incoming bomber threat could be detected much earlier, the need for an aircraft like the SR.53 had disappeared, and the project was cancelled on 29 July 1960, with the third prototype (XD153) never built.

== Aircraft on display ==
The first SR.53 prototype, XD145, is preserved at the Royal Air Force Museum Cosford near Wolverhampton.

== Operators ==
United Kingdom

- Ministry of Supply

== Specifications ==
Data from The British Fighter since 1912

General characteristics

- Crew: 1
- Length: 45 ft 0 in (13.72 m)
- Wingspan: 25 ft 1.5 in (7.658 m)
- Height: 10 ft 10 in (3.30 m)
- Wing area: 274 sq ft (25.5 m^{2})
- Airfoil: RAE 102
- Empty weight: 7,400 lb (3,357 kg)
- Gross weight: 18,400 lb (8,346 kg)
- Fuel capacity: 11,000 pounds (5,000 kg), including 500 pounds (230 kg) reserved for turbojet engine
- Powerplant: × Armstrong Siddeley ASV.8 Viper 8 turbojet engine, 1,640 lbf (7.3 kN) thrust
- Powerplant: 1 × de Havilland Spectre liquid-fuelled rocket engine, 8,000 lbf (36 kN) thrust

Performance

- Maximum speed: Mach 2.2
- Endurance: 7 minutes at full power (jet + rocket)
- Service ceiling: 67,000 ft (20,000 m)
- Maximum speed: Mach 2.2 at 52,800 ft (16,100 m) (M1.34 achieved)
- Rate of climb: 52,800 ft/min (268 m/s)
- Time to altitude: 50,000 ft (15,240 m) in 2 minutes 12 seconds
- Wing loading: 67.2 lb/sq ft (328 kg/m^{2})
- Thrust/weight: 0.52

Armament

- Missiles: 2 × de Havilland Firestreak infra-red guided missiles

== See also ==
Related development

- Saunders-Roe SR.177

Aircraft of comparable role, configuration, and era

- Avro 720
- Republic XF-91 Thunderceptor
- SNCASE SE.212 Durandal
- SNCASO Trident

Related lists

- List of aircraft of the Royal Air Force
