= Red Dean =

British air-to-air missile design

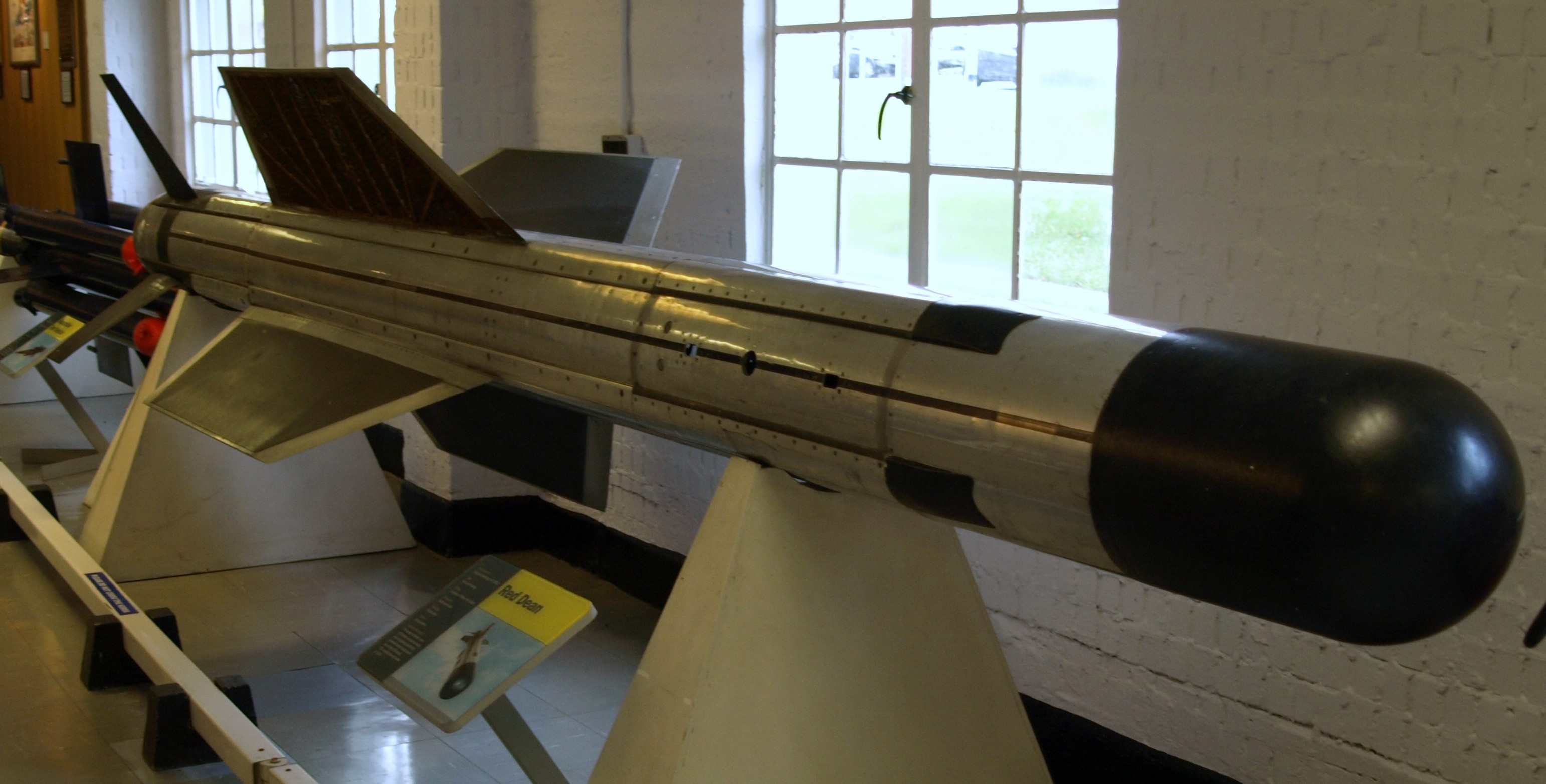
- Red Dean on display at the Royal Air Force Museum Cosford
- Type: Air-to-air missile
- Place of origin: United Kingdom

Production history
- Manufacturer: Vickers

Specifications
- Mass: 1,330 lb (603 kg)
- Length: 16 ft (4.9 m)
- Warhead: 100 lb (45 kg) high explosive
- Engine: Bristol Aerojet Buzzard; 6,750 lb (30 kN)
- Operational range: 4 miles (6.4 km)
- Flight ceiling: 50,000 ft (15,000 m)
- Maximum speed: Mach 2.2
- Guidance system: active radar homing
- Steering system: control surfaces

Red Dean, a rainbow code name, was an air-to-air missile developed for the Royal Air Force during the 1950s. Originally planned to use an active radar seeker to offer all-aspect performance and true fire-and-forget engagements, the valve-based electronics demanded a missile of prodigious size.

Folland Aircraft won the development contract in February 1950 to arm the Gloster Meteor, weighing in at about estimated 600 pounds (270 kg). After some initial progress, chief engineer Teddy Petter seemed uninterested in pursuing the design and the contract was cancelled in November 1951. In July 1952 it was picked up by Vickers, who had already experimented with a number of large missiles. Their design was too large for Meteor, so it was instead designed for the emerging Gloster Javelin.

Problems with the General Electric Company (GEC) X-band seeker led to the missile having to be enlarged several times, eventually reaching a massive 1,330 pounds (600 kg), which made it too heavy for the Javelin. The weapon was then selected to arm the upcoming thin-wing Javelin. Continued problems led Vickers to completely redesign it, abandoning the GEC seeker in favour of a simpler semi-active radar homing. This reduced the weight to 700 pounds (320 kg) and finally to 400 pounds (180 kg) with transistorization.

When British intelligence learned of new Soviet supersonic bombers, the Thin-Wing Javelin was cancelled in 1956 in favour of Operational Requirement F.155. Unsuited to these designs, Red Dean was cancelled in June. A new weapon dedicated to this role began in 1955 as Red Hebe. Also developed by Vickers, Red Hebe suffered from the same growth in weight and size and was ultimately cancelled in 1957 along with F.155.

== History ==
=== Red Hawk ===
By the late World War II era each of the British forces had ongoing missile development programs. Among these was the January 1945 Air Staff Operational Requirement 1056 for an air-to-air missile intended as an anti-bomber weapon. OR.1056 called for a weapon able to attack from any angle using either radar or infrared homing, the radar version using the signals from the AI Mk. IX radar being installed at that time. This project was assigned the Ministry of Supply (MoS) rainbow code "Red Hawk".

By 1947 all of the missile projects were suffering from a lack of funding and manpower as many of the projects drew on the same pool of talent. The MoS decided to rationalize development by centralizing it at the Royal Aircraft Establishment (RAE). After much debate, the MoS chose four programs to continue; the Royal Navy's surface-to-air missile Seaslug, a similar design for the Royal Air Force and British Army known as "Red Heathen", the Navy's Blue Boar television guided anti-ship bomb, and Red Hawk.

Among the early proposals for the Red Hawk design was one from Gloster Aircraft, received in October 1947. This was a large missile in aircraft form, similar to a very small swept wing fighter. The missile would have to be lowered beneath the aircraft on a trapeze before launch in order for the seeker to pick up the signal from the fighter's radar. The RAE were not impressed and developed their own preferred design, consisting of a bullet-shaped unpowered "dart" that was launched up to speed by drop-off solid fuel rocket motors.

Continued study demonstrated the Red Hawk system was simply beyond the state of the art. For a head-on attack, the aircraft would be approaching each other while the missile flew. In order for the weapon to be launched from far enough to keep the fighter outside of the bomber's fire during the missile's flight, the radio energy needed for tracking would demand a very powerful radar or a very large antenna to focus it enough. Neither appeared practical in the near term.

In August 1948, the Air Ministry released a simpler specification for a weapon capable of tail-chase approaches against propeller-powered bombers like the Tupolev Tu-4. This watered-down specification was given the nick-name "Pink Hawk". This was eventually awarded to Fairey Aviation under the official rainbow code "Blue Sky" and emerged as the Fireflash.

=== Red Dean emerges ===
Although Pink Hawk was ultimately successful in building a cut-down version of Red Hawk, the original all-aspect requirement remained unfilled. In early 1951 the RAE and Air Ministry felt that the technology had progressed enough to once again take up the development of Red Hawk. This was released as the joint Naval/Air Staff Target 1056 which had the double duty of both a fighter weapon as well as a bomber self-defence weapon.

On 18 June 1951, Group Captain Scragg concluded that Red Hawk would not be available for some time, and suggested that it be re-directed as a pure fighter weapon. This led to Operational Requirement 1105, which was given the name "Red Dean". This was intended for use by two-seat fighters, notably the Gloster Javelin and De Havilland Sea Vixen, but also the single-seat Supermarine Swift. Although not mentioned specifically, illustrations from this era show the missile mounted on the Gloster Meteor as well.

The OR called for a missile that could be carried in pairs by any aircraft of 10,000 pounds (4,500 kg) and up, without seriously affecting its performance. Its primary targets would be bombers and fighter bombers flying up to Mach 0.95 and maximum altitudes as high as 60,000 ft. Fighters were suitable targets, if possible, but only if it did not delay the program. It had to be able to attack from any direction, using an active radar seeker so the fighter did not have to continue the approach after launch. It needed to have a probability of kill against a bomber of at least 50%.

=== Folland gives up ===
The contract for Red Dean was initially won by Folland Aircraft, largely on the basis of Teddy Petter's mid-1951 contract tender. Petter had a streak of successes at English Electric Aviation, including the Canberra and Lightning, but moved to Folland in February 1950 to develop a small and low-cost fighter, which became the Folland Gnat.

Folland was already involved in missile development with the RAE in the RTV.2 test vehicle, which began to suffer from delays and cost overruns. At the same time, the seeker from EKCO began to grow in weight. (Note: It is not recorded in available sources, but it is likely EKCO was chosen for the seeker due to their earlier success with the small radar used for Fireflash.) Although the program had progressed to the point of fitting dummy missiles to the Meteor for carriage trials, Petter apparently lost interest in the project and wrote to the RAE that he felt Folland was not the right company to be developing the missile. The Air Staff cancelled the contract in November 1951.

Through this period the RAE was also growing concerned about the range of the missiles using solid fuel rockets. They considered a series of designs using ramjet power beginning in 1953. One advantage was that the missile engines could be used for additional aircraft thrust during takeoff or high-speed dash, and then topped off with fuel from the fighter's fuel tanks. Unfortunately, they found that when the weapon would have to be launched subsonically it would require a small rocket to get it up to the ramjet's ignition speed of Mach 1.3, adding 50 pounds (23 kg) to the design. The decision was made to continue with a pure-rocket.

=== Vickers takes over ===
In July 1952, Vickers was asked to provide design studies for the Red Dean requirement. They received a development contract in March 1953. At the time, the design was to weigh 600 pounds (270 kg) (Note: About the same as the similar US design, the AIM-7 Sparrow.) and be powered by four Buzzard motors from the Propellant and Explosives Research and Manufacturing Establishment. It was initially intended to arm the night fighter versions of the Meteor, but ground clearance was not great enough and so it was changed instead to the Javelin and De Havilland Sea Venom. This initial work led to an official requirement in June 1955, known to the Air Ministry as OR.1105 and the Admiralty as AW.281, for an "active radar homing all-round attack weapon system operating on collision course tactics."

The X band guidance radar from the General Electric Company (GEC) soon ran into problems, delaying the possible in-service date. This led to it being redirected once again, this time to the F.153 thin-wing Javelin that was then under design. Ground launched testing began with 40% scale models known as WTV.1 to test the guidance system, boosted off the ground using three large Demon rocket motors. This led to the full-sized WTV.2, also ground-launched, which included extensive telemetry. By this time, the design had grown several times and was now 16 feet 1 inch (4.90 m) long and weighed a massive 1,330 pounds (600 kg). Some of this was due to the enlarged 100 pounds (45 kg) warhead, which was required due to the low accuracy of the seeker. This increase in size and weight demanded a change in the rocket motor, to a 14,000 pounds-force (62,000 N) Falcon. In spite of the larger motor, range was a very short 4 nautical miles (7.4 km; 4.6 mi).

=== Testing ===
For air testing, Canberra WD956 was delivered to Wisley Airfield near the Vickers plant on 8 August 1951. It was then sent to RAF Hurn for fitting with launch rails. It returned to Wisely and made its first carriage test flight with motor-less WTV.2 missiles in October 1953 and follow-up tests in May 1954 to test the jettison system. A second aircraft, WD942, was similarly modified and sent to Woomera awaiting the missiles. Meanwhile, to test the effects of the rocket motor on the wing of the aircraft, a test rig was constructed consisting of a section of a Canberra wing mounted in an A-frame system that could be rotated to change the simulated angle of attack.

"Live" testing began in June 1954 with semi-complete designs, the WRV.4C containing the seeker and the WTV.4E with the proposed proximity fuse. On the first live test flight, the shear pin that held the missile to the rail was found to be too strong; when the missile motor fired its thrust was enough, even briefly, to cause the aircraft to yaw significantly. On the second flight, the pin was improperly installed and failed to shear at all. The resulting yaw caused the plane to flip over on its back before the missile finally broke free and the aircraft lost almost 20,000 ft altitude while recovering. A delay ensued while a new latching system was developed. A further delay ensued after the aircraft rolled off the runway due to a brake failure on 21 September 1955, and its duties were taken over by WD942, which returned to the UK on 28 September.

=== Cancellation ===
Complaints were constant about the size and weight of the system, especially aimed at GEC whose seeker was heavier than its WWII counterparts. Vickers eventually decided to start a complete redesign, abandoning the GEC seeker in favour of a semi-active system. This led to a new design of late 1955 or early 1956 of "only" 700 pounds (320 kg), but then further simplifications lowered this to a spritely 400 pounds (180 kg).

Around this time, British intelligence services learned of the new Myasishchev M-52, which cruised at about Mach 1.2 and had a dash speed around Mach 1.5. The thin-wing Javelin would have significant difficulties dealing with this aircraft and the Air Ministry put all its attention on newer supersonic designs that were being developed as part of Operational Requirement F.155.

Red Dean had been designed for launch from subsonic fighters and would fly supersonically only for a few seconds. On F.155 they would be flying continually at supersonic speeds and the airframe was not able to handle the resulting aerodynamic heating. For this new role, Vickers proposed what engineer Ralph Hooper described as "a development of Red Dean only in the same way that P.1103 is a development of the Hunter." This new project was assigned the name "Red Hebe".

As a result of these changes in mission, and the cancellation of the Thin-Wing Javelin which would have carried it, Red Dean was cancelled in June 1956.

== Description ==
The original Folland version was intended to be carried one each on the wingtips of the Meteor. It was 15 feet 7 inches (4.75 m) in length and 13 inches (330 mm) in diameter. The rocket motor was centered in the cylindrical fuselage and exited through a nozzle at the extreme rear, within a partial cone boat tail section. The front of the missile had a similar conical nose cone.

Control was through four large rectangular wings arranged near the middle of the fuselage, and four small rectangular control fins just forward of the tail cone. The wings had a span of 4 feet 5 inches (1.35 m) and the tail 3 feet 8 inches (1.12 m). During development the control layout was changed, adding a triangular fillet to the front of the main wings and extending the tail controls to 4 feet 8 inches (1.42 m) and adding what the UK referred to as "mach tips", but is more widely known today as a cropped delta, intended to keep the rear section of the controls out of the shock waves generated by their leading edge.

The initial design at Vickers was similar, but shortened by removing a section of the rear fuselage to reduce the length to 14 feet 5 inches (4.39 m) and making both the wings and fins 4 feet (1.2 m) wide. The most notable change was to extend the boat tail section forward, to a point just behind the wings. The first full-scale missiles, of the WTV.2 series, featured a hemispherical nose cone which reduced overall length to 14 feet (4.3 m), and slightly smaller wings and fins at 3 feet 6 inches (1.07 m) span. The lengthy boat tail section was removed, returning to a design more similar to the final Folland versions.

The final prototype versions, starting with WTV.4, was extended in length to 15 feet (4.6 m) and featured new wings and fins with swept-back leading edges and swept-forward trailing edges. This layout was largely retained the for final pre-production model, WTV.5, which added an extended ogive nose cone that took the length to 16 feet 1 inch (4.90 m) and reshaped the fins to add mach tips.

Internally the layout was somewhat complex. The rocket motor was arranged near the center of the fuselage, aligned with the wings in order to minimize changes in center of gravity as the motor burned. The warhead was just in front of the motor, roughly at the midpoint of the fuselage. To keep it from overheating while the rocket fired, air was fed through the fuselage around the warhead casing.

Power for the electronics and control fins was supplied by a relatively large De Havilland turboalternator in front of the warhead, powered by compressed air in a number of small bottles arranged around the rocket exhaust tube. Air was led forward, and power back, in channels under the wings, which can be seen in the photograph above. The seeker and fuse was at the nose.

As it was felt that the vibrations from the rocket motor would produce too much mechanical noise into the radar system, the rocket had been designed to give a short burn time of only two seconds in order to minimize the time before the control system could activate. In testing, it was found that the problem was nowhere near as bad as expected. This led to modifications of the autopilot to allow it to control through the entire flight, with an accelerometer indicating the end of the rocket firing and then reducing the control power to avoid slowing the missile during the coasting phase by applying large control inputs.
