= De Havilland Spectre =

1950s British aircraft rocket engine

Spectre
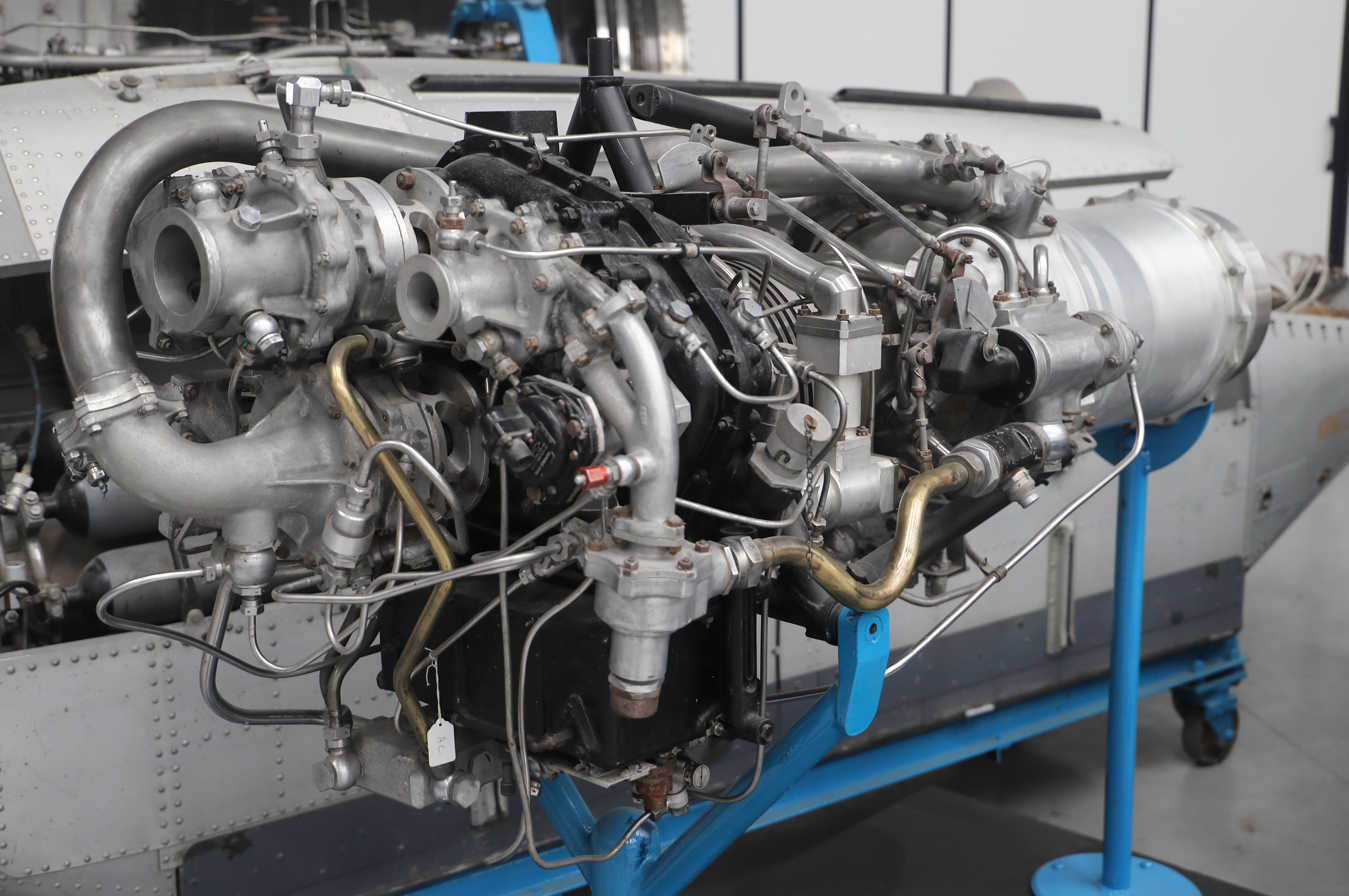
- de Havilland Spectre on display at the de Havilland Aircraft Museum
- Type: Rocket engine
- National origin: United Kingdom
- Manufacturer: de Havilland
- First run: 1952
- Major applications: Saunders-Roe SR.53

The de Havilland Spectre is a rocket engine that was built by the de Havilland Engine Company in the 1950s. It was one element of the intended mixed power-plant for combination rocket-jet interceptor aircraft of the Royal Air Force, such as the Saunders-Roe SR.177.

== Design and development ==
The Spectre was a bipropellant engine burning kerosene and hydrogen peroxide. The power could be controlled from 10–100% delivering 8,000 lbf (35.7 kN) of thrust at full power. In the SR.53 it used the same fuel tanks as the turbojet engine and if run at full power was expected to consume the full load in about seven minutes.

In 1952 static testing commenced with the Spectre DSpe.l. The aircraft industry had no precedent for an engine which would gain in thrust with altitude and the required maximum thrust was estimated at between 2,000 lbf (8.9 kN) and 15,000 lbf (67 kN) thrust. The design was based on a variable thrust which could be throttled from 8,000 lbf (36 kN) to 2,000 lbf (8.9 kN). Design philosophy was matched to the mixed power concept of an aircraft having both a turbojet and rocket engine for maximum operational flexibility.

Primary innovation was as the first to incorporate its turbo pump turbine upstream of its combustion chamber. Described then as low loss. Technological innovation embraced the Barske high-speed open-impeller centrifugal pumps, as formerly researched in the Walter organisation, regenerative cooling with pump stages both upstream and downstream, gauze catalyst packs, low-loss internal-flow turbine and the use of straight kerosene fuel. The aircraft tanks were to be pressurised to suppress pump cavitation problems.

It went through rig tests commencing in 1953, bench tests from mid-1954, and testing in two Canberras. From flight approval in Autumn 1956, flight experience again posed altitude starvation problems. Clearance was given for flight in the SR.53 prototype from May 1957.

In October 1957 a contract was announced for a more advanced version of the aircraft as the SR.177 to utilise a revised design Spectre DSpe.5 engine together with a reheated supersonic capability 14,000 lbf (62 kN) thrust de Havilland Gyron Junior turbojet engine, thus meeting a full mixed-power aircraft concept. In conjunction with the new engine, development had been undertaken with two major ancillaries, a peroxide starter for the gas turbine and a peroxide auxiliary power unit. Virtually on the heels of the announcement of the contract came the notorious 1957 Defence White Paper declaring that all future combat would be undertaken by computer-controlled missiles, and that crewed interceptors were now considered obsolete.

Development flying of the SR.53 continued through 39 flights operating to Mach 1.33, and to altitudes at 55,000 ft (17,000 m), as research and construction proceeded on the SR.177, until its cancellation in 1958.

After merging of interests in 1959, it was manufactured by Bristol Siddeley.

The Spectre project was cancelled in October 1960, at a reported total cost of £5.75 million.

== Variants ==
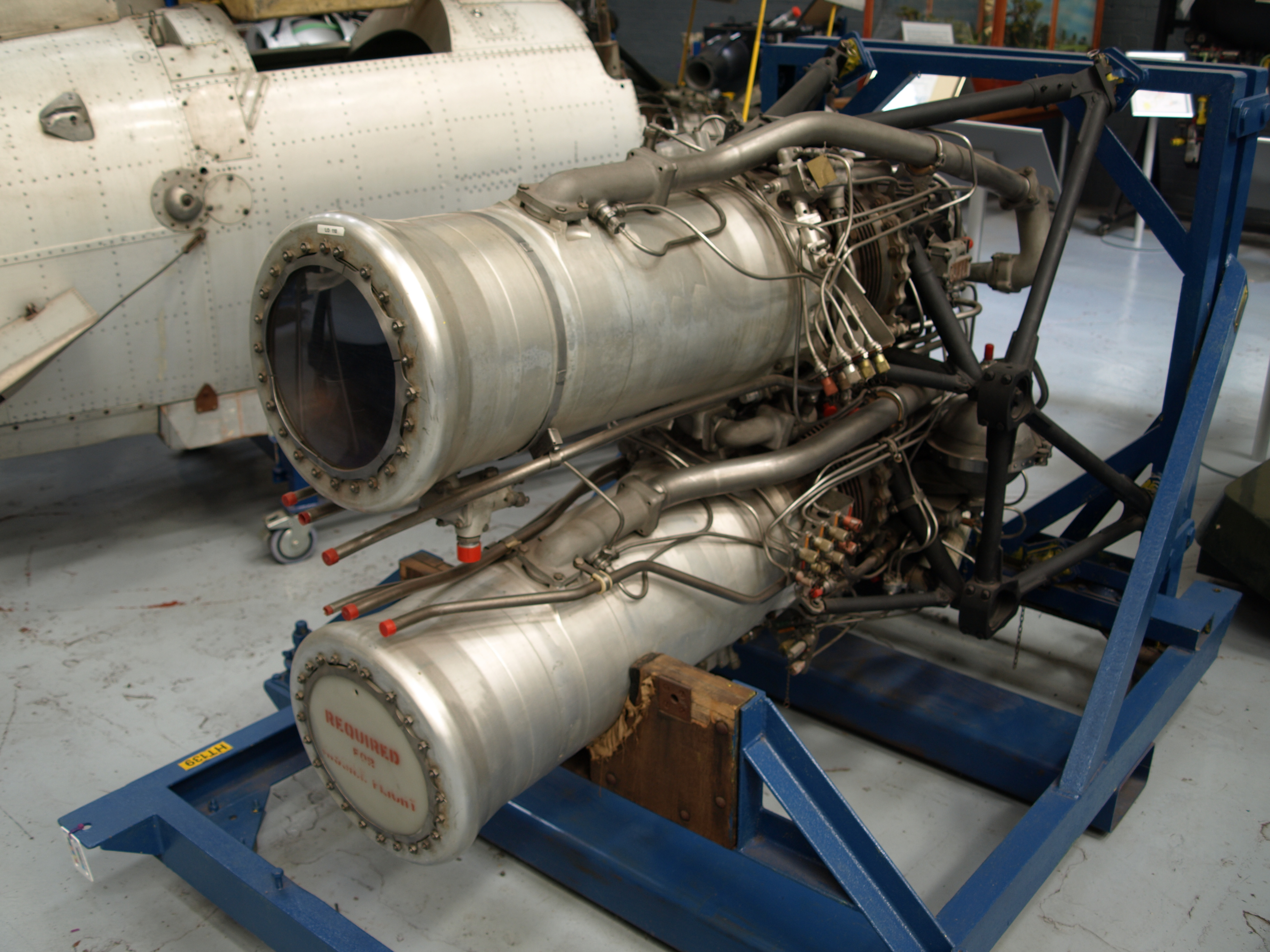
Double Spectre engine on display at the Rolls-Royce Heritage Trust, Derby

Variants included:

DSpe.1
Initial version.
DSpe.2
Constant thrust version, simpler design.
DSpe.3
Development of Dspe.1 with variable thrust.
DSpe.4
Development of Dspe.2, constant thrust RDS.15 ATO – "limited quantities".
DSpe.5
Further development of Dspe.1, variable thrust.
DSpe.5A
10,000 lbf (44,000 N) thrust version intended for the Saunders-Roe SR.177
DSpe.D.1 Double Spectre
A doubled version of this engine, used for early flight-testing of Blue Steel nuclear stand off bomb, with two chambers arranged vertically; a fixed thrust D.Sp.4 above a variable thrust D.Sp.5.

The conventional Spectre DSpe.5 had been developed alongside a DSpe.4 RATO variant, the latter for the Avro Vulcan and Handley-Page Victor V bombers, another programme subsequently cancelled after a single trial take-off of a Victor from the de Havilland aerodrome at Hatfield. These two engines were then used in combination to power the development rounds of the Blue Steel missile stand-off bomb, together with the peroxide APU, from its first flight in October 1959.

== Applications ==
- Aerfer Leone
- Blue Steel missile (Avro)
- Handley Page Victor (XA930 only for trials)
- Saunders-Roe SR.53
- Vickers Type 559

== Engines on display ==
Preserved Spectre engines are on display at the following museums:

- Royal Air Force Museum Cosford
- De Havilland Aircraft Museum
- East Midlands Aeropark

== Specifications (D.Sp.5) ==
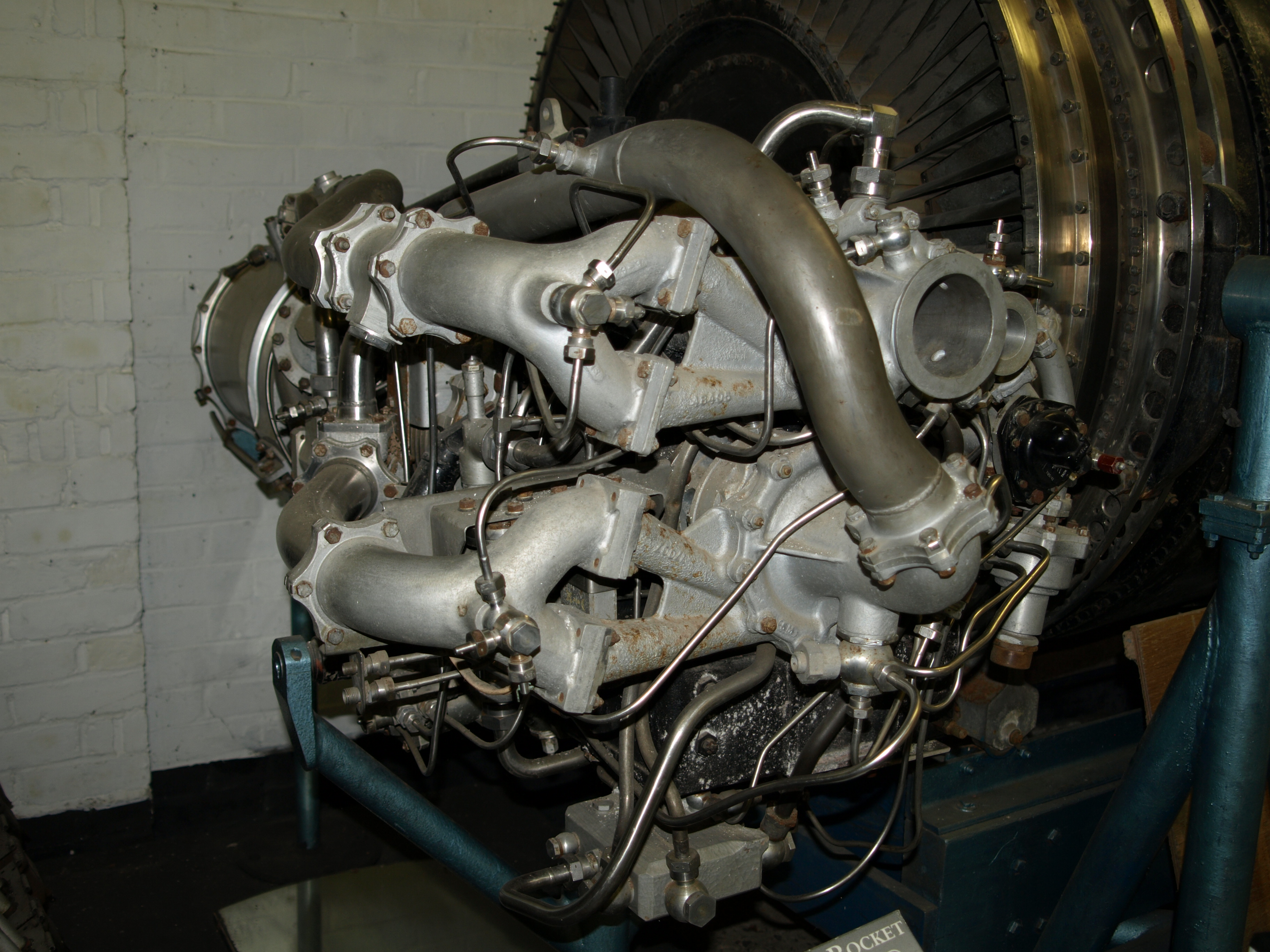
Spectre rocket engine on display at the de Havilland Aircraft Museum

Data from Aircraft engines of the World 1959/60.

=== General characteristics ===
- Type: fully variable thrust Liquid-propellant rocket engine
- Length: 56.4 in (1,430 mm)
- Diameter: 27 in (690 mm)
- Dry weight:
- Fuel: Hydrogen peroxide/Kerosene

=== Components ===
- Pumps:

=== Performance ===
- Thrust: 8,000 lbf (36,000 N) (full power)
- Burn time:

== See also ==
Comparable engines

- Bristol Siddeley 605
- Napier Scorpion

Related lists

- List of aircraft engines
