= Red Top (missile) =

- Red Top missile
- Type: Air-to-air missile
- Place of origin: United Kingdom

Service history
- In service: 1964 - 1988
- Used by: United Kingdom, Saudi Arabia, Kuwait

Production history
- Manufacturer: Hawker Siddeley Dynamics
- Unit cost: £18,000

Specifications
- Mass: 154 kilograms (340 lb)
- Length: 3.32 metres (10.9 ft)
- Diameter: 0.23 metres (9.1 in)
- Wingspan: 0.91 metres (3 ft 0 in)
- Warhead: 31 kg (68.3 lb) annular blast fragmentation
- Detonation mechanism: Green Garland infrared proximity; secondary contact fuze
- Engine: Linnet solid fuel motor
- Operational range: 7.5 miles (12 km)
- Maximum speed: Mach 3.2
- Guidance system: infrared homing, limited all-aspect
- Steering system: control surfaces

The Hawker Siddeley (later British Aerospace) Red Top was the third indigenous British air-to-air missile to enter service, following the de Havilland Firestreak and limited-service Fireflash. It was used to replace the Firestreak on the de Havilland Sea Vixen and later models of the English Electric Lightning.

Originally designed as an upgraded version of the Firestreak, Red Top emerged as a much more capable weapon, with roughly double the range, a more sensitive seeker giving limited all-aspect capability, and an even larger warhead than the already-large one in Firestreak. In its primary role as an anti-bomber weapon fired at medium and high altitudes, it offered a significant improvement in overall performance.

Red Top was originally intended to replace Firestreak outright, but carrying the missiles on the Lightning required additional area to be added to the Lightning's vertical stabilizer for stability at high speed. For this reason, Firestreak continued to be used on older models of the Lightning. Both missiles passed out of service in 1988 when the last of the Lightnings retired.

== Development ==
=== Improved Blue Jay ===
Even before the original Firestreak entered service, improvements were being studied to increase its performance. Still known by its rainbow code "Blue Jay", the Blue Jay Mk. II concept introduced an improved seeker and more powerful motor known as Magpie II. The Mk. III was similar, but used a derated motor to limit acceleration when launched from new supersonic interceptors in order to avoid overheating due to aerodynamic friction. Neither project was proceeded with.

=== Blue Vesta ===
In late 1954, the Air Ministry received intelligence about new Soviet supersonic bomber designs. In January 1955 they issued Operational Requirement F.155 for a new interceptor aircraft capable of defeating these bombers, preferably at long range. Along with it was another requirement, OR.1131, for an all-aspect missile that would allow attacks from the front quarter and thus avoid having to chase the bombers as was required with the tail-aspect Blue Jay Mk. I. De Havilland responded with Blue Jay Mk. IV, which was later given its own rainbow code, "Blue Vesta".

Blue Vesta adopted the PbTe seeker of Mk. II and further upgraded the motor to the new Magpie III. To handle the aerodynamic heating issues, the fins were made of steel rather than aluminium, and featured cut-away sections to keep the rear portions of the surfaces out of the Mach cones, a feature they referred to as "mach tips". (Note: More widely known today as a cropped delta.)

Work on Blue Vesta was curtailed after 1956 as the Royal Aircraft Establishment (RAE) concluded that the closing speeds of two Mach 2+ aircraft would be so rapid that the missile would have no chance to be launched while it was still within the range of its seeker. They suggested moving to the much larger radar-guided Red Hebe, although some low-level work on Blue Vesta's underlying technologies continued.

=== Red Top ===
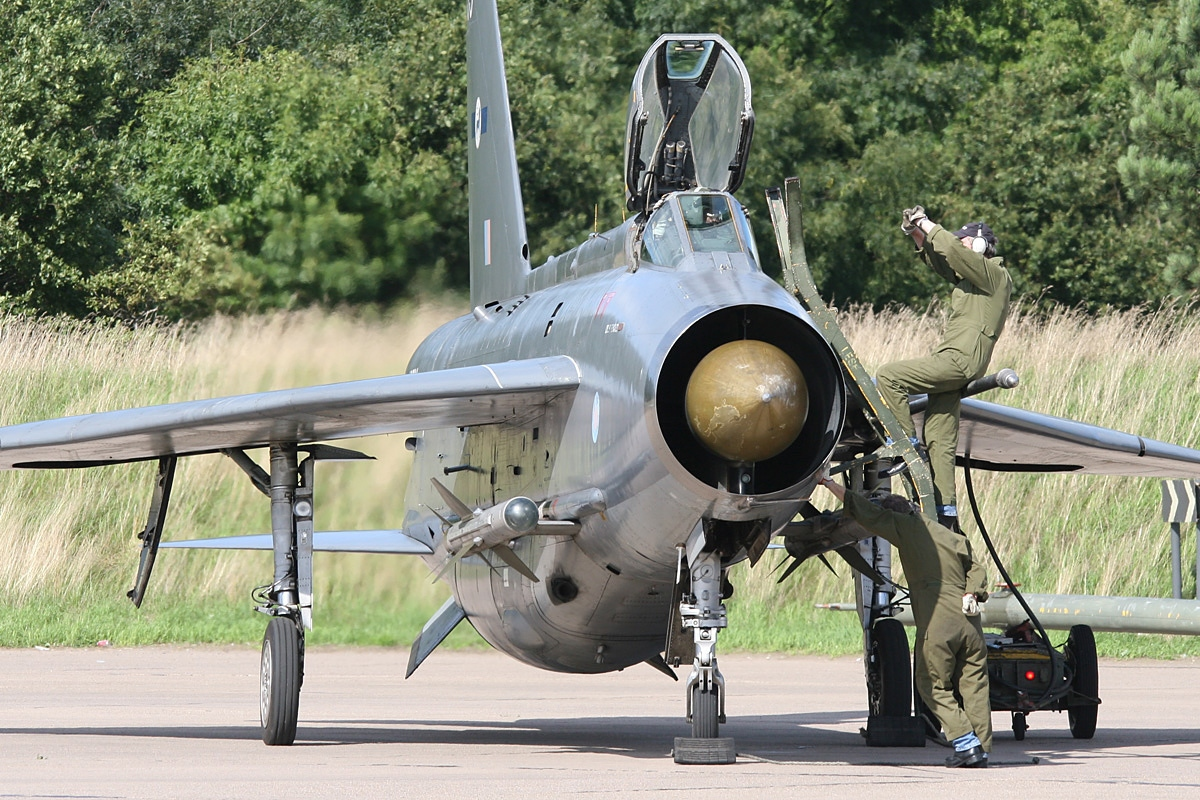
Red Top mounted on the forward fuselage of a Lightning

F.155 was canceled in the aftermath of the release of the 1957 Defence White Paper, as Duncan Sandys noted that it would not be in service before new Soviet ballistic missiles had rendered the need for crewed interceptors moot. This argument was successfully countered by the Air Ministry, which pointed out that the Tupolev Tu-22 "Blinder" would be in service in 1962 resulting in a several-year gap where the RAF had no effective response.

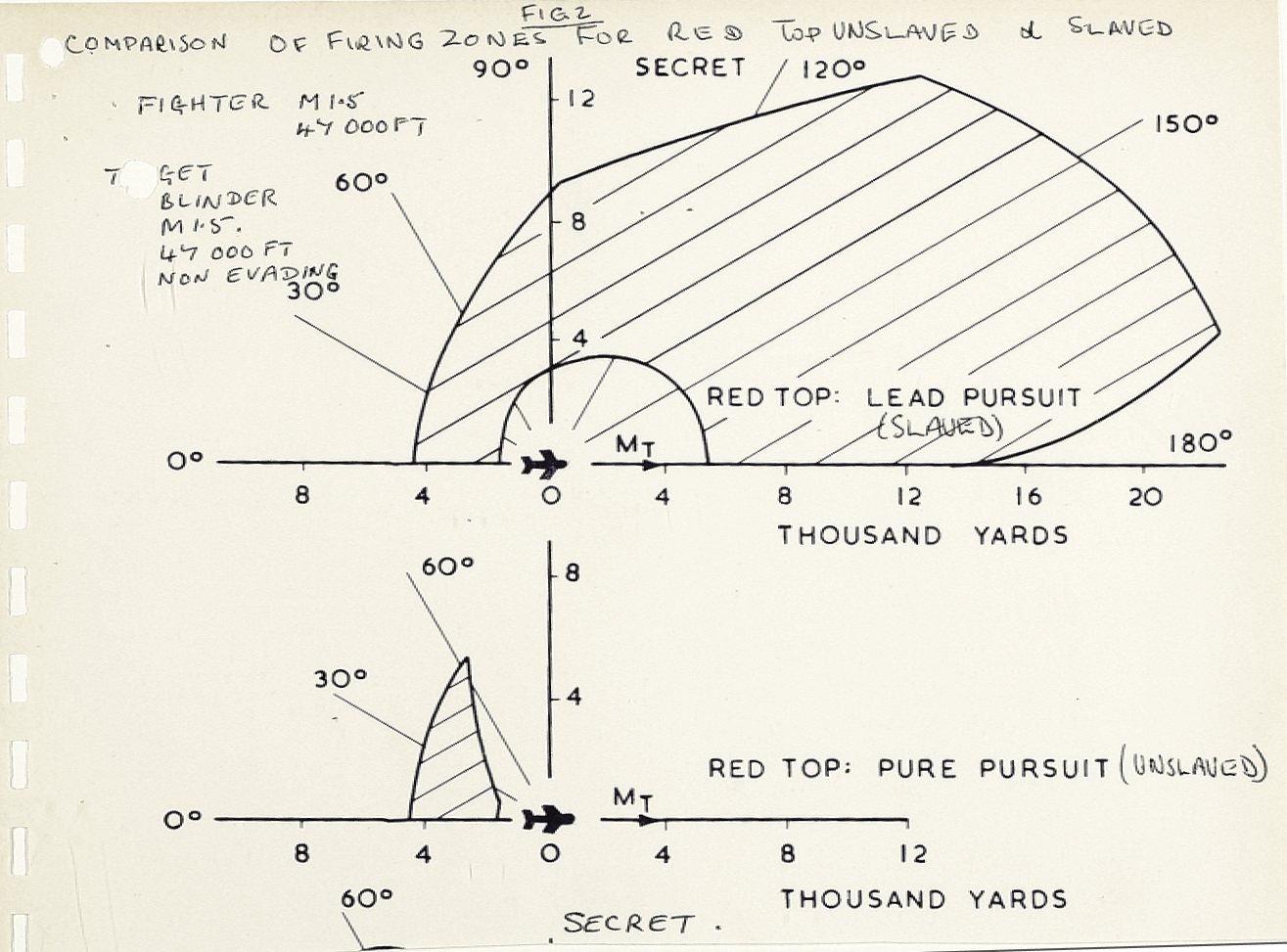
A declassified 1965 UK MoD drawing that shows the Red Top's firing zone from a Lightning at Mach 1.5 at 47,000 feet altitude against a Tu-22 Blinder at the same speed and altitude. The firing zone from a Sea Vixen FAW2 would have been smaller due to the Sea Vixen FAW2's slower speed. Courtesy of secretprojects.co.uk member GUNDAM123dx.

It was decided to proceed with the development of the English Electric Lightning largely because it was already close to being complete. But even its Mach 2 speed would offer marginal performance over the Blinder (Note: Although this turned out to be untrue as the Tu-22 ultimately met few of its performance goals. Its maximum speed, unloaded, was Mach 1.42, giving the Lightning ample performance against it.) and a tail-chase against this plane would be difficult to perform. Blue Vesta was reactivated in July 1957 to provide an all-aspect weapon for Lightning and allow head-on attacks. For security reasons, yet another rainbow code was assigned in November 1957 and it became "Red Top".

Firestreak's valve-powered electronics were replaced by transistorized versions, which were smaller and greatly improved reliability. More importantly, they no longer required active cooling, which in Firestreak had been accomplished with an aircraft-mounted system using ammonia, presenting a ground-handling safety issue. Removing the ammonia bottles and all of the plumbing for the cooling systems freed up room in the electronics section and the aircraft-mounted weapon pack.

Elimination of the cooling for the electronics also had the side-effect of removing the cooling for the seeker head, which had been used to improve its performance. A new cooling system using highly filtered air replaced the ammonia. For Red Top, the all-aspect lead telluride (PbTe) seeker developed for Blue Vesta was replaced by a much less expensive indium antimonide (InSb) system known as "Violet Banner". This seeker lacked the sensitivity of the PbTe model and did not offer general all-aspect capability; while it worked against supersonic targets warmed by skin friction, it would not work against subsonic targets and required a tail-aspect in these cases. This loss in performance was offset to some degree by increasing the field of view from 30 to 60 degrees, allowing the fighter much greater tactical freedom.

In contrast to Blue Vesta, which retained most of the original Firestreak physical layout, Red Top significantly rationalised the design. The fuselage was straightened, removing the boat-tail layout of the Firestreak. Previously the Magpie motor was in a bottle in the centre of the missile, and its exhaust reached the rear through a long tailpipe. The warhead was wrapped around the pipe, but that left too little room for the control fin actuators, which were instead controlled from nose-mounted actuators using long pushrods.

In Red Top, the smaller electronics package allowed the warhead to be moved forward, leaving room for the control actuators to be mounted directly on the fins and thus removing the need for the pushrods. Moving the actuators to the rear, along with the air bottle that powered them, still took up much less room than the warhead, allowing the rocket motor to be made larger by extending it rearward. This resulted in significantly higher performance than the original design.

With the warhead moved forward and the guidance electronics now taking up less room, the warhead was enlarged to 31 kg (68.3 lb) from Firestreak's already prodigious 22.7 kg (50 lb). (Note: For comparison, the contemporary AIM-9B Sidewinder's warhead was only 4.5 kg.) It also used an expanding-rod warhead in place of the earlier blast fragmentation type. This move also left room at the rear of the fuselage for one of the two rows of the IR proximity fuse, which were formerly positioned just in front of the mid-mounted wings. This gave the missile an improved view of its targets. The new "Green Garland" fuse required smaller rectangular windows, compared to the Firestreak's large triangular windows, further simplifying the layout.

The Red Top was much faster and had greater range and manoeuvrability than the Firestreak, and its infrared seeker enabled a wider range of engagement angles. "Unlike modern [1990s] missiles, Red Top and Firestreak could only be fired outside cloud, and in winter, skies were rarely clear over the UK."

=== Almost cancelled ===
Although Red Top was a relatively straightforward upgrade to Firestreak, Sandys almost cancelled it as well. He felt that Firestreak would be acceptable during the short period before the Bloodhound Mk. II SAM entered service in the early 1960s and eliminated the need for interceptor aircraft altogether. The Air Staff argued this point, ultimately convincing him that Red Top's head-on attack profile against new Soviet supersonic bombers known to be in development was an urgent requirement.

At a February 1958 meeting of the Controller of Guided Weapons and Electronics, the group earmarked Red Top for both Lightning and the Fleet Air Arm's de Havilland Sea Vixen. It was expected that Red Top would offer a dramatic leap in performance for Sea Vixen, as its enlarged motor significantly improved its performance when launched subsonically, the relative improvement being less when launched from a supersonic Lightning. There was also some discussion of mounting four Red Top on Blackburn Buccaneer, likely the B.112 version that had been proposed to replace Sea Vixen for long-duration combat air patrol.

Independently, in 1959 Jon Fozard of Hawker Aircraft also considered using Red Top on the Hawker Siddeley P.1127. The concept fit the aircraft with a more powerful engine, added the AIRPASS radar from the Lightning, and carried a pair of Red Top missiles.

=== Testing and service ===
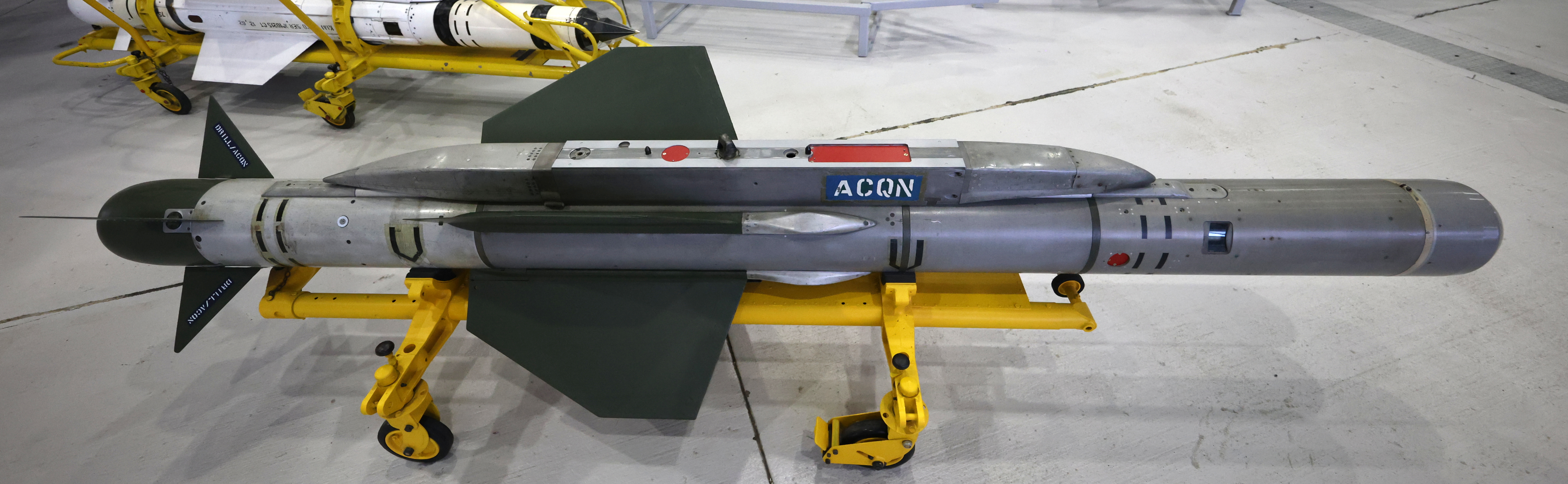
Red Top on display at the Imperial War Museum Duxford.

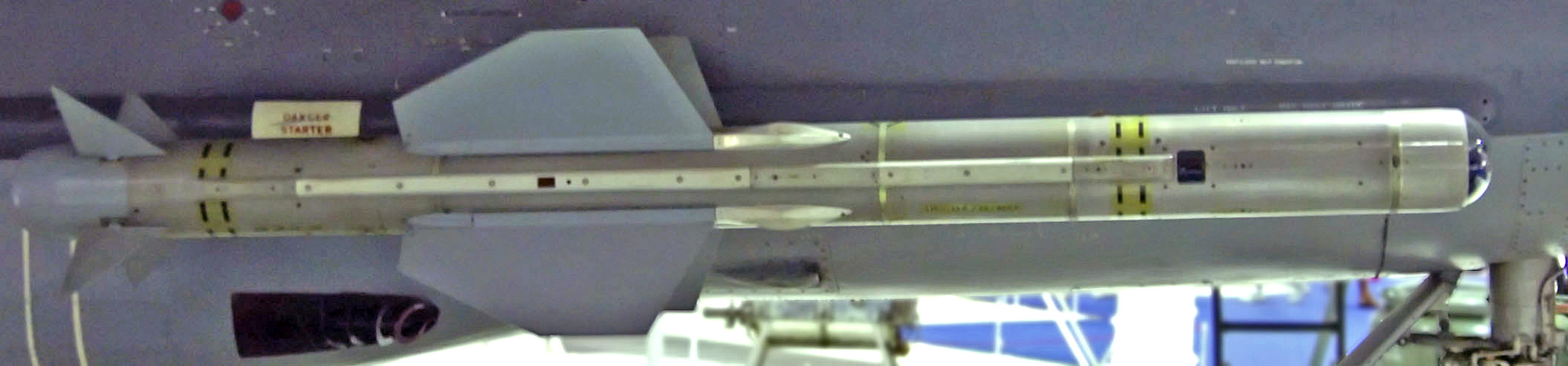
Red Top mounted on an English Electric Lightning at the Royal Air Force Museum London at Hendon.

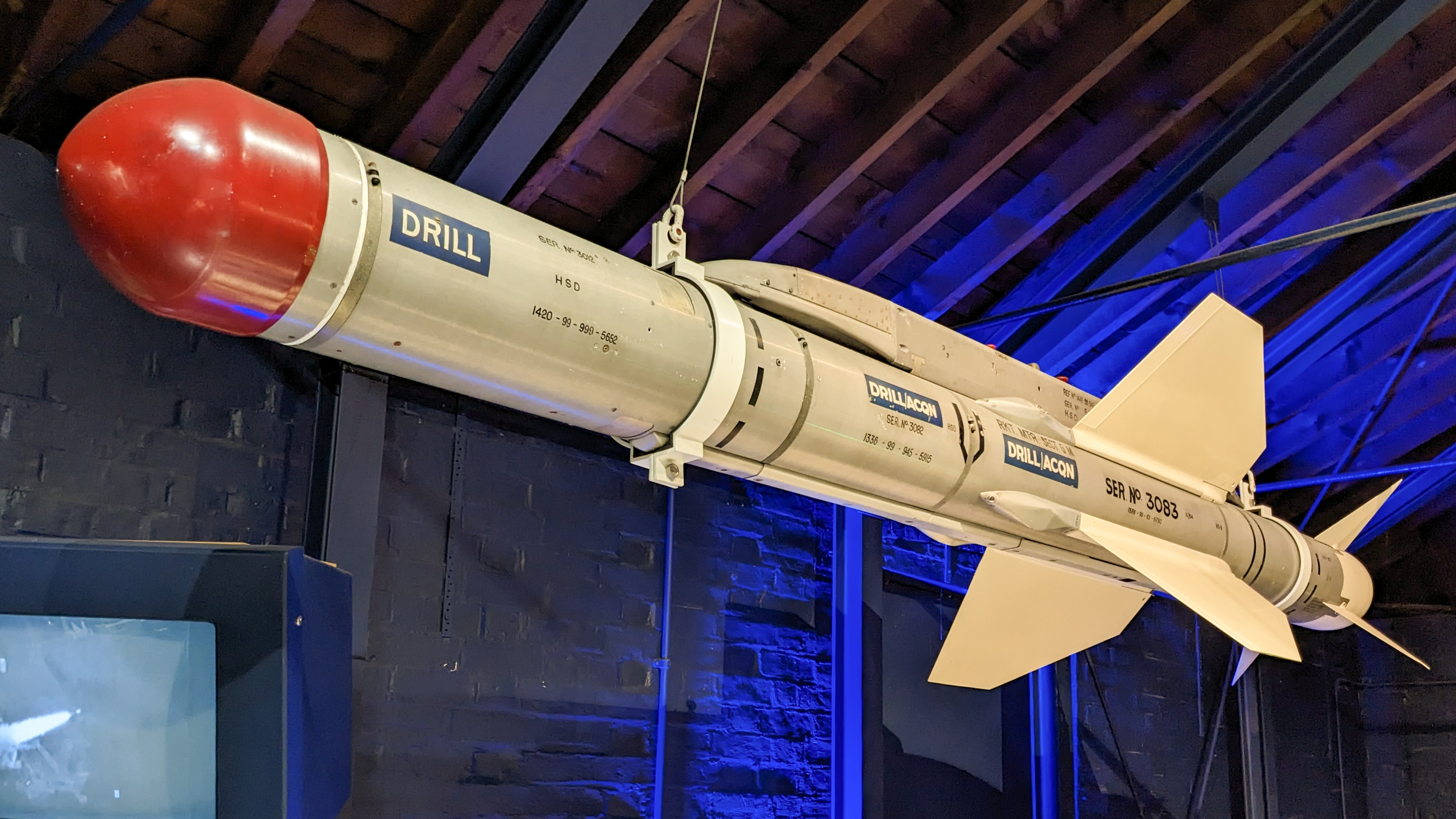
Red Top on display at Explosion Museum of Naval Firepower

Red Top testing began using the new fuselage layout with the original Firestreak faceted nosecone and leftover Magpie III motors from the Blue Vesta program. Ten such lash-ups had been fired by June 1959. Guidance tests with the new motor and seeker were carried out from an English Electric Canberra beginning in early 1960 and firing from the Lightning in September 1961.

The Red Top entered service on both the Lightning and Sea Vixen in 1964. It remained in service until the final retirement of the Lightning in 1988. Unusually, the missile that the Red Top was intended to replace – Firestreak – also remained in service on the Lightning until 1988. This was because Red Top's larger wing area required the Lightning to have a larger fin to maintain stability at high speeds. Newer models of the Lightning were modified for Red Top, leaving Firestreak on the older models that were already in service.

=== Further upgrades ===
While the development of Red Top was being carried out, another adaptation of the original Firestreak was being considered to produce a semi-active radar homing version that would allow a single airframe to be converted from IR to radar by changing the nose section. Initially known as Blue Jay Mk. V, this became "Blue Dolphin", (Note: It is not clear in existing references if this was an official Rainbow Code.) but this was cancelled in 1958.

A longer-ranged Red Top Mk. 2 was also proposed, replacing the Linnet rocket with a liquid fuel rocket running on MADI/RFNA, likely the de Havilland Spartan.

=== Phantom debate ===
When plans began to introduce the McDonnell Douglas Phantom in UK service, the issue was raised about the inclusion of Red Top on that platform. It was agreed from the start that the primary weapon for this platform would be the AIM-7 Sparrow, but the choice of a secondary weapon was more contentious, with arguments being made for both Red Top or the AIM-9 Sidewinder. Those favouring the Red Top, mostly within the Ministry of Defence, pointed to its much higher performance against supersonic targets, especially in frontal engagements where it could be fired at ranges over 20,000 yards (18 km) under favourable conditions. It also had roughly double the maximum engagement angle, when radar cued, which gave the interceptor improved tactical freedom on their choice of approach.

In contrast, the Director of Surface and Amphibious Warfare (DSAW) noted several problems. Integrating the missile with the Phantom's radar would require modifications to the aircraft and this was ruled out for budgetary reasons. This would mean that the missile would have to be locked on using its own seeker, which would greatly limit the angles that it could be fired at. In these situations, it had roughly the same firing angles as the Sidewinder. If radar cueing was added, then it would also suffer from the same problems that Sparrow would in terms of electronic countermeasures or a radar failure on the aircraft, which was the entire argument for including a secondary IR-based weapon. That being the case, the cost of Red Top, at £18,000 had little advantage over the Sidewinder, at £3,500 to £3,900. Additionally, Red Top was heavier, especially if one considered the mounting system, which would reduce the loiter time of the aircraft. Although some Red Top from the Sea Vixen fleet could be salvaged, the cost of buying additional missiles to fill out the larger fleet of Phantom aircraft would cost as much as simply buying a complete set of Sidewinder. These arguments won the day and the Phantom carried Sidewinder in service.

== Former operators ==
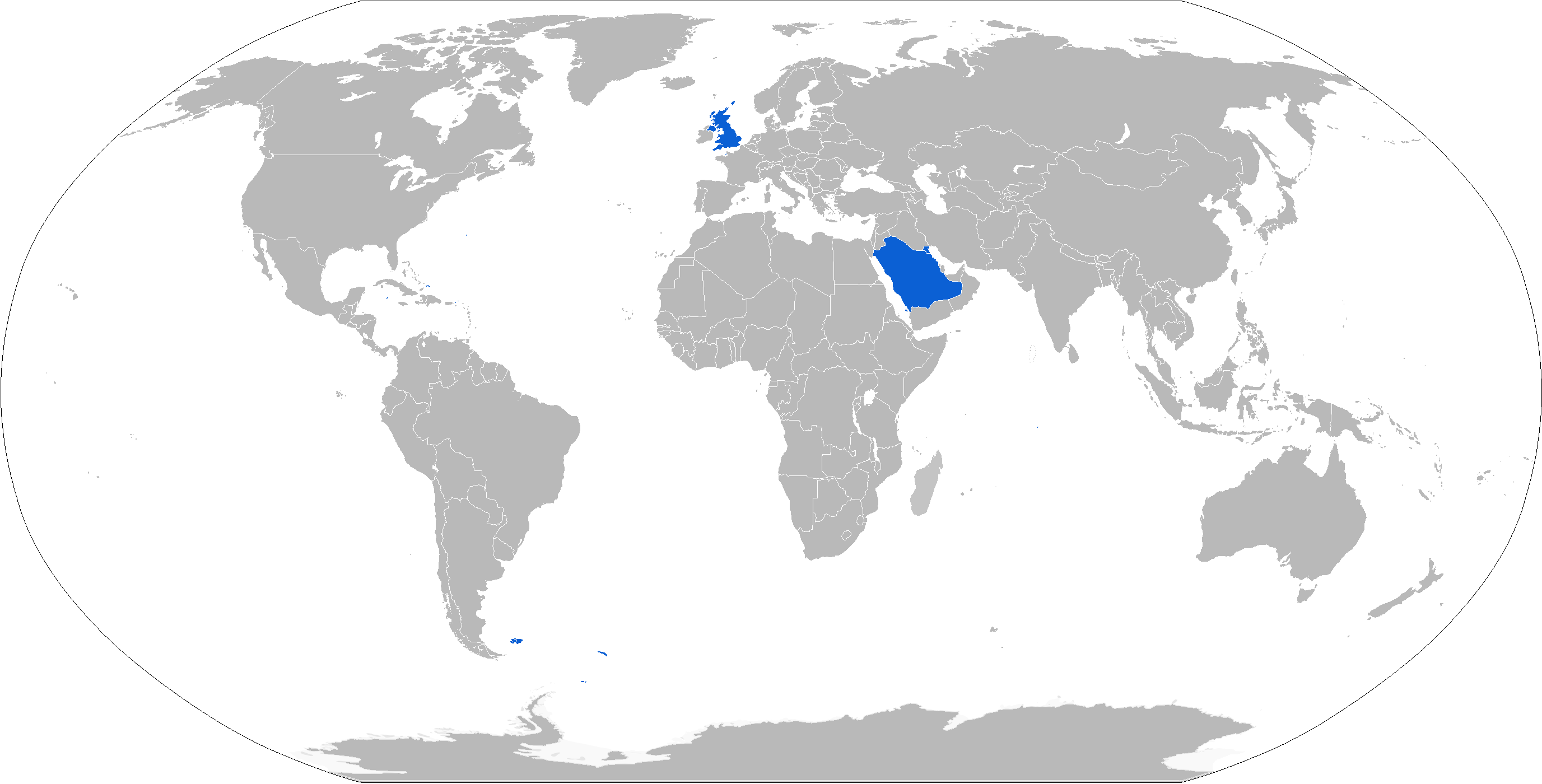
Map with Red Top operators in blue

Kuwait

- Kuwait Air Force

Saudi Arabia

- Royal Saudi Air Force

United Kingdom

- Royal Air Force
- Royal Navy, Fleet Air Arm

== See also ==
- Rainbow Codes
