= Red Hebe =

1950s British planned air-to-air missile

Red Hebe was a large active radar homing air-to-air missile developed by Vickers for the Royal Air Force's Operational Requirement F.155 interceptor aircraft. It was a development of the earlier Red Dean, which was not suitable for launch by the new supersonic aircraft. Before progressing much beyond advanced design studies, F.155 was cancelled in the aftermath of the 1957 Defence White Paper which moved Britain's attention from strategic bombers to ballistic missiles. With no other suitable platform, Red Hebe was cancelled as well.

== History ==
=== Red Dean ===
By the late World War II era each branch of the British military had their own ongoing missile development programmes. Among these was the January 1945 Air Staff Operational Requirement 1056 for an air-to-air missile intended as an anti-bomber weapon. OR.1056 called for a weapon able to attack from any angle, an "all-aspect" design, using either radar or infrared homing. A radar version would need to use the signals from the AI Mk. IX radar being used at that time. This project was assigned the Ministry of Supply (MoS) rainbow code "Red Hawk". It soon became clear that Red Hawk was beyond the state of the art and an interim design was proposed, nicknamed "Pink Hawk". This dropped the all-aspect requirement and reduced it to tail-chase attacks, which were much easier to guide with existing systems. Given the official development name "Blue Sky", it entered service in 1956 as Fireflash.

Long before Fireflash flew, in 1951 the Air Ministry concluded that electronics was progressing fast enough to reconsider the all-aspect concept, and issued yet another design under the name "Red Dean", calling for a weapon with active radar homing. Using active homing meant the missile could be used by any fighter, as it was not linked to the signals from the fighter's own radar - it could even be used by day fighters without any radar assistance. This also meant the missile had to carry what was essentially a miniaturized version of an aircraft interception radar, which generally weighted hundreds of pounds, and would additionally need a power supply capable of producing radar transmissions of sufficient power.

Initially taken up by Folland Aircraft in 1951, chief designer Teddy Petter eventually lost interest in the project and it was taken up by Vickers the next year. Problems with the seeker led to the missile undergoing constant weight growth, eventually reaching 1,330 pounds (600 kg), making it too heavy to fly on most aircraft of the era. It was then targeted for the P.376 "thin-wing' Javelin which would enter service in the late 1950s. Weight problems with the seeker continued, and in 1955 General Electric Company (GEC) proposed a new seeker based on transistors, which were just emerging. This would reduce the seeker weight from 105 pounds (48 kg) to 90 pounds (41 kg). This could be further reduced to 60 pounds (27 kg) if the system used semi-active radar homing (SARH), as this dramatically reduced the power requirements. The resulting semi-automatic version is sometimes referred to as Red Dean Mk. 1.

=== New design ===
In 1955, the Air Ministry learned of the Tupolev Tu-22 supersonic bomber and concluded that bombers flying at Mach 2 would be the next threat to contend with. They realized that even the mildly-supersonic thin-wing Javelin would be unable to deal with this threat effectively, and canceled further development. In place of the Javelin, the Air Ministry proposed their future interceptor needs would be met by faster supersonic designs being considered as part of Operational Requirement F.155.

Red Dean had been designed for carriage by subsonic aircraft and would only fly for a short time at supersonic speeds after it was launched. On these new aircraft, they would spend long times at supersonic speeds and then get even faster after launch. The materials used for Red Dean were not designed to handle the heat loads from the skin friction at these speeds, and would not be usable on these aircraft. Accordingly, when Vickers heard of the changes in the aircraft program, they proposed a new missile of stainless steel given the name "Red Hebe". (Note: Rainbow codes were supposed to be created by selecting two words from separate lists, but there are many instances where this is not true and rainbow code-like names were simply made up by the engineers. In this case, the term "hebe" appears on no other project and is likely invented by the Vickers team.)

Red Hebe was similar to the later Red Dean concepts with transistorized seekers. Nevertheless, Ralph Hooper described it as "a development of Red Dean only in the same way that P.1103 is a development of the Hunter." The idea of moving to SARH was rejected as that would require modifications to the AI radar to allow it to produce a continuous signal during tracking, which would not be easily added to the conical scanning arrangement. The small available room in the nose for the radar antenna led to low resolution and thus the need for a large warhead to counteract the low accuracy of the weapon.

As a result of the steel airframe, high required speed, and a huge 150 pounds (68 kg) warhead, Red Hebe emerged as a system with roughly the same weight as Red Dean at 1,330 pounds (600 kg) even with the lighter electronics. Worse, it was even larger, at 17 feet 9 inches (5.41 m) long and reached 22 feet 10 inches (6.96 m) when fitted with drop-off aerodynamic fairings intended to reduce drag when being flown on aircraft at Mach 2.5. It was also quite large in diameter at 15 inches (380 mm), although this may have been due to the desire to optionally fit a small nuclear warhead. Some documentation refers to a "British RP.3", RP.3 being the UK name for the US-developed AIR-2 Genie unguided nuclear rocket. There is speculation that the warhead would be the "Purple Passion" device intended for landmine use.

The new weapon was considered as questionable as Red Dean before it. A significant criticism came from Squadron Leader Poole of the Operational Requirements branch of the Air Ministry. He was sent on a tour of the US to examine their missile programs and returned a report that described the US systems as being much simpler and better developed than their UK counterparts. He described Sidewinder as having less performance than the UK's Blue Vesta "but much simpler and now in use", while stating Red Hebe was "... still in the piston era" compared to Sparrow. He concluded that the US got "more for their money at less than half the weight" and that "Red Hebe will fade out in a few months since [it is] in a different technical age."

There is some indication that Red Hebe was slated to be canceled in any event; during the studies for the Blue Steel there was some concern that English Electric was already overstretched and consideration was given to handing the project to Vickers, as it was assumed they would have little to work on. This was during the period when Red Dean and Red Hebe were still ongoing. Additionally, the Director of Guided Weapons at the Ministry of Supply, John Clemow, held a low opinion of the Vickers team. (Note: It is not entirely clear when Red Dean and Red Hebe were canceled; Forbat describes the program being run down between August 1956 and March 1957, but then mentions a Ministry of Supply letter of 16 April 1957 that appears to be the final cancellation.)

=== Vickers Small Weapon ===
With the weight of the missile limiting it to only one aircraft design, Vickers once again began a complete redesign to introduce a smaller and lighter weapon. This emerged as the Vickers Small Weapon, of roughly 9 feet 10 inches (3.00 m) length and 675 pounds (306 kg). This made it only slightly larger and heavier than Sparrow, but with an improved seeker. This smaller size reduced performance to the point where it was considered suitable only for "warm" wars where the absolute destruction of the target was not as important as it would be in a European hot war.

=== Cancellation ===
The 1957 Defence White Paper prepared by Duncan Sandys considered the ongoing changes in the strategic outlook. Among its conclusions was that the strategic bombing role would switch from aircraft to ballistic missiles by the mid to late 1960s. At the time it was believed that any mission against the UK would be strategic in nature and would use nuclear weapons, and there seemed to be no mission that could not be carried out by sufficiently powerful warheads making up for any lack of accuracy in placement by missiles. In this environment, it was unlikely that shooting down enemy bombers would have any effect on the outcome – even if a bomber-based attack were made, missiles would be sure to follow and the result would be basically the same.

Sandys identified a period, between 1957 and the mid-1960s in which the bomber remained the primary vehicle of attack and anti-aircraft weapons would still be needed. However, he felt the imminent arrival of the Bloodhound surface-to-air missile would fill this requirement. The Air Staff convinced him that near-term threats like the Tupolev Tu-22 were outside the capability of the Javelin and would arrive before Bloodhound. Sandys relented and agreed to allow the English Electric Lightning and Red Top missile to continue development to fill this role, cancelling the Blue Envoy long-range missile and OR.155 as they would all arrive outside this time frame.

Red Hebe no longer had a launch aircraft and was also cancelled. John Clemow, the Vickers critic, personally signed the cancellation.
