= De Havilland Engine Company =

Defunct British aero engine manufacturer

de Havilland Engine Company
- Industry: Aerospace engineering
- Founded: 1944
- Defunct: 1961
- Fate: Merged with Bristol Siddeley
- Successor: Bristol Siddeley
- Headquarters: Leavesden, Watford, UK
- Key people: Frank Halford (Designer)
- Products: Aircraft engines
- Parent: de Havilland Aircraft Company

The de Havilland Engine Company was an offshoot of the de Havilland aircraft building company, which started life as the 'Engine Division of the de Havilland Aircraft Company' in 1926 producing the famous de Havilland Gipsy aero-engine. The company was merged with Bristol Siddeley (BSEL) engines in 1961 with BSEL subsequently becoming part of Rolls-Royce Limited in 1966.

== History ==
The company was officially formed at Stag Lane in February 1944 and later moved into a factory leased by the government in 1946 at Leavesden, which had earlier been a site for Handley Page Halifax production. This is now the location of Leavesden Film Studios.

It went on to produce one of the early turbojet engines the de Havilland Goblin which saw service in the early post-war de Havilland Vampire fighter. The later Ghost turbojet propelled early versions of the de Havilland Comet jetliner and the de Havilland Venom fighter.

The company later developed the de Havilland Gnome turboshaft under licence from the General Electric T58 design, but the company was absorbed into Bristol Siddeley Engines Limited (BSEL) in 1961; Bristol Siddeley itself subsequently merged with Rolls-Royce Limited in 1966 and the merged company continued with the "Rolls-Royce" name.

== Engines ==
=== Piston engines ===
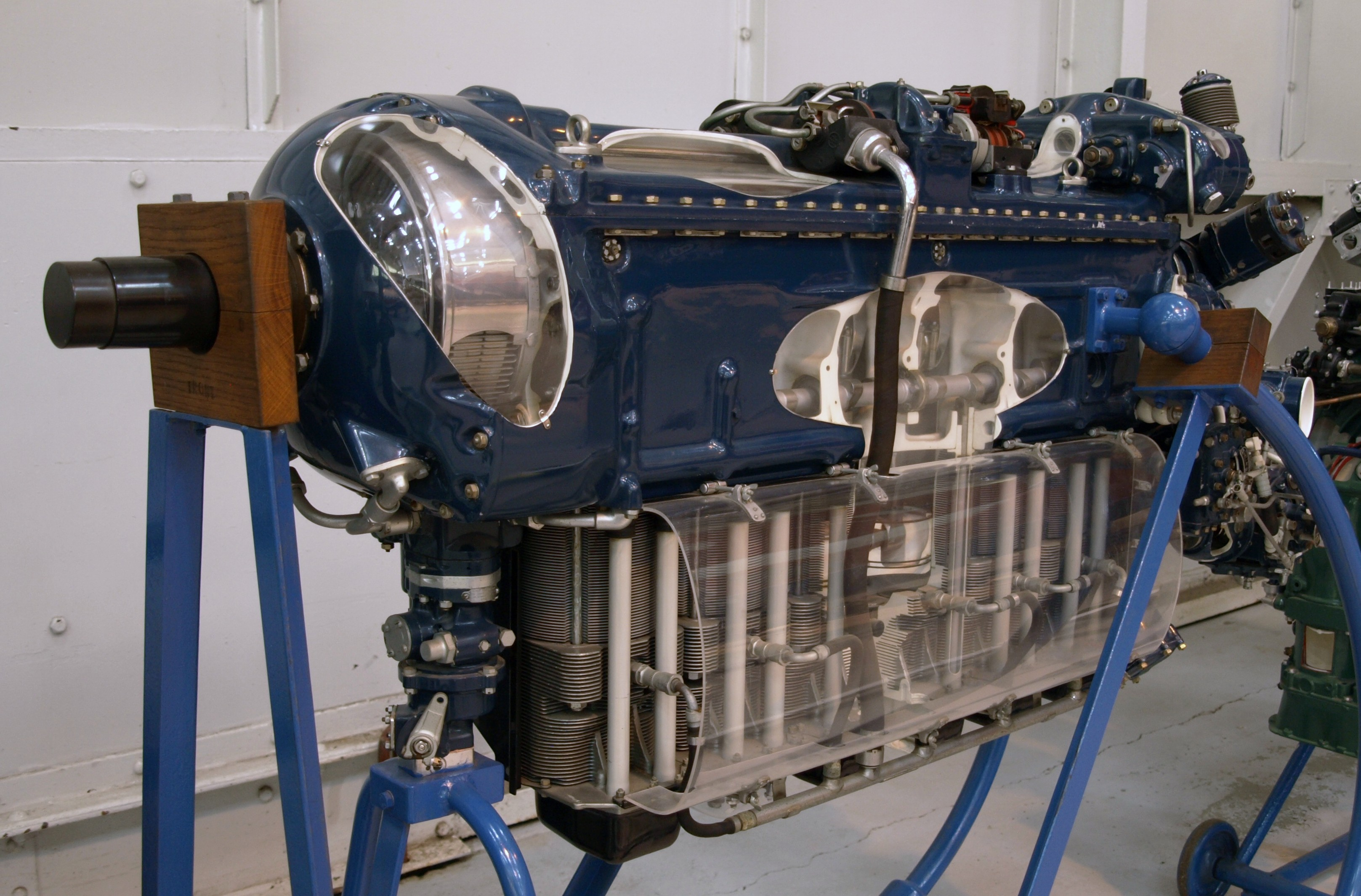
A de Havilland Gipsy Queen at the Royal Air Force Museum Cosford

- de Havilland Ghost
- de Havilland Gipsy
- de Havilland Gipsy Minor
- de Havilland Gipsy Major
- de Havilland Gipsy Six
- de Havilland Gipsy Queen
- de Havilland Gipsy Twelve
- de Havilland Gipsy King

=== Turbojets ===
- de Havilland Ghost
- de Havilland Goblin
- de Havilland Gyron
- de Havilland Gyron Junior

=== Turboshafts ===
- de Havilland Gnome
- Rolls-Royce Gem

=== Rocket engines ===
- de Havilland Sprite
- de Havilland Super Sprite
- de Havilland Spectre

== See also ==
- de Havilland Aircraft Museum
- de Havilland Propellers
- Frank Halford

Related lists

- List of aircraft engine manufacturers
- List of aircraft engines
