= Gyron (disambiguation) =

A gyron is a triangular heraldic ordinary. Gyron may also refer to:

- de Havilland Gyron and de Havilland Gyron Junior, aircraft jet engines of the 1950s
- Ford Gyron, experimental car produced in 1961
