= Frank Halford =

English aircraft engine designer

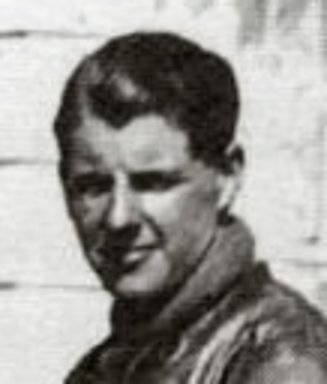
- Frank Halford (1922)
- Born: 7 March 1894; Nottingham
- Died: 16 April 1955 (aged 61); Northwood, Middlesex, England
- Education: Felsted School; University of Nottingham
- Engineering career
- Discipline: aero engine designer
- Projects: de Havilland Gipsy, de Havilland Goblin, de Havilland Ghost, de Havilland Gyron, Napier Rapier, Napier Dagger, Napier Sabre

Major Frank Bernard Halford CBE FRAeS (7 March 1894 – 16 April 1955) was an English aircraft engine designer. He is best known for the series of de Havilland Gipsy engines, widely used by light aircraft in the 1920s and 30s.

== Career ==
Educated at Felsted, in 1913 he left the University of Nottingham before graduating in order to learn to fly at the Bristol Flying School at Brooklands, later becoming a flight instructor for Bristol. In 1914 he joined the Aeronautical Inspection Department of the War Office

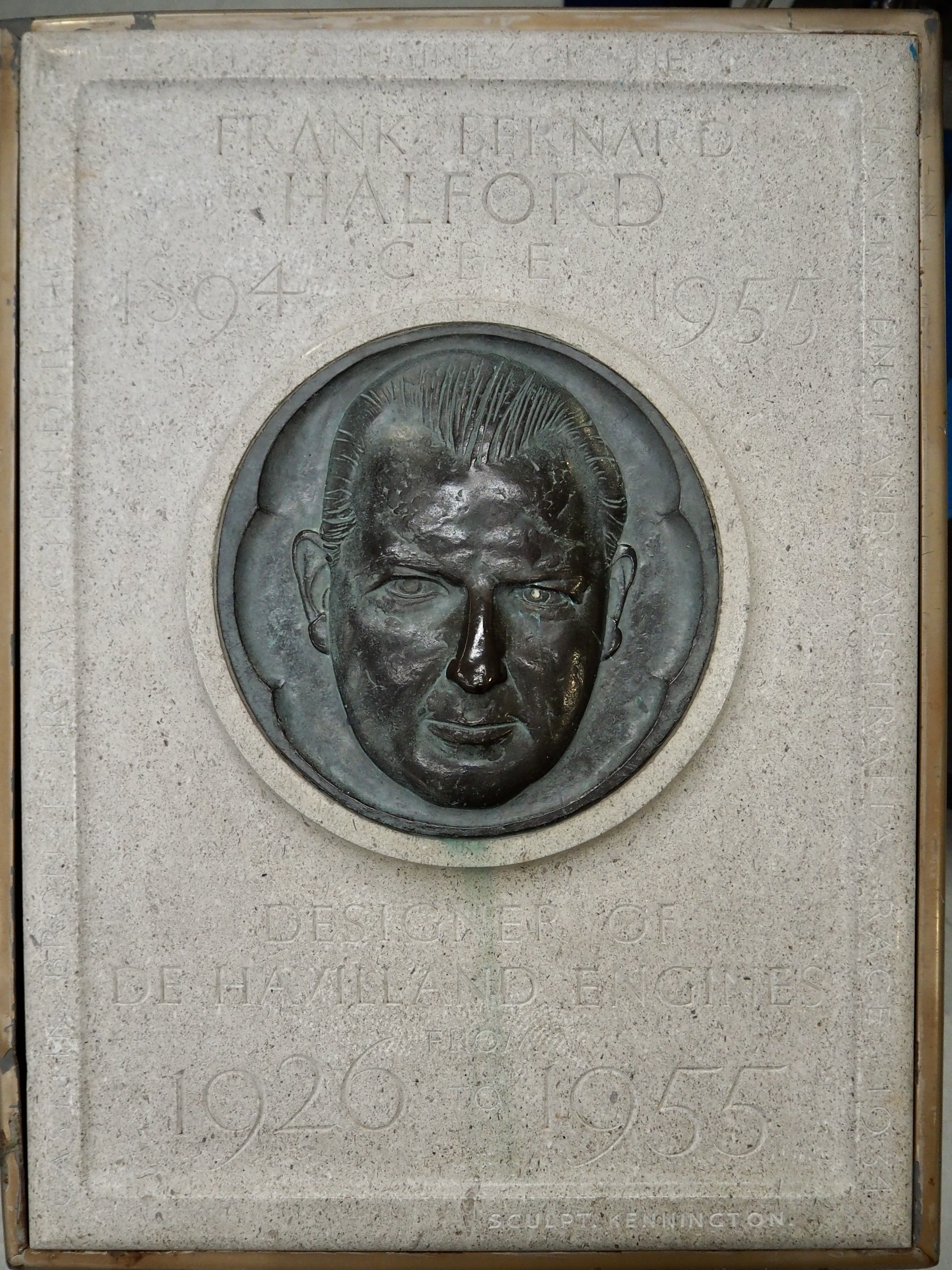
Memorial to Major Frank Halford, De Havilland Aircraft Museum, Hertfordshire

On the outbreak of the First World War he joined the Royal Flying Corps where he fought at the front. Recalled to engineering duties he improved and enlarged the water-cooled six-cylinder Austro-Daimler, producing the 230 hp (170 kW) Beardmore Halford Pullinger (BHP). This engine was further developed by Siddeley-Deasy as the Puma.

In 1922 he raced a 4-valve Triumph Ricardo in the Senior TT, finishing 13th. That same year he was commissioned to produce a luxury motorcycle for Vauxhall. Based on aero-engine principles, it featured an in-line unit construction four cylinder engine, with shaft drive to the rear wheel. Four examples were made, one exists in a private collection in the Isle of Man.

Working for Airdisco, he redesigned the Puma engine as the Nimbus and also developed a V-8 engine based on the company's large stores of surplus Renault engine parts. There in 1924 he designed the first of the long-running Cirrus series at the request of de Havilland.

In 1923 he set up his own consultancy in London, alongside the engine designer Harry Ricardo. From 1926 he designed the de Havilland Gipsy air-cooled inline engines, repeating the success of the Cirrus.

During this period Frank Halford also designed and had built the AM Halford Special racing car which he raced at Brooklands in the 1926 RAC British Grand Prix, as well as in many other races from 1925 to 1926.

During the 1930s Halford and Harry Ricardo became interested in the sleeve valve as a method of increasing the allowable operating RPM and compression ratio of piston engines, thereby increasing the power from an otherwise smaller engine. From 1928 Halford worked with D. Napier & Son, eventually producing the Sabre, an H engine, which became one of the most powerful piston aero engines built, producing 3,500 hp (2.6 MW) from only 2200 cubic inches (36 L) in late-war versions.

During the war he became interested in jet engines, and designed a simplified version of Frank Whittle's centrifugal-flow designs with the air intake on the front and "straight-through" combustion chambers. Known initially as the Halford H.1, the project was undertaken for de Havilland who produced it as the de Havilland Goblin. Halford's company was eventually purchased outright by de Havilland in 1944. Halford continued working on jets, turboprop and rocket engines.

== Piston engines ==
- Beardmore Halford Pullinger
- ADC Cirrus
- de Havilland Gipsy
- de Havilland Gipsy Major
- Napier Rapier
- Napier Dagger
- Napier Sabre
- Siddeley Puma

== Jet engines ==
- de Havilland H.1 Goblin
- de Havilland H.2 Ghost
- de Havilland H.3 - turbopropeller Gipsy replacement, 500 shp
- de Havilland H.4 Gyron
- de Havilland H.5 - developed Ghost - not built
- de Havilland H.6 Gyron Junior
- de Havilland H.7 - gas generator, later developed as Napier Oryx

== See also ==
- de Havilland Aircraft Museum
