= Bristol Siddeley =

British aero engine manufacturer

Bristol Siddeley Engines Limited
- Industry: Aerospace, engineering
- Predecessor: Bristol Aero-Engines division of Bristol Aeroplane Company; Armstrong Siddeley Motors Limited
- Founded: 1959; 67 years ago by merger
- Defunct: 1966; 60 years ago
- Fate: Purchased and merged into Rolls-Royce
- Successor: Rolls-Royce Limited
- Headquarters: Filton, Bristol, United Kingdom
- Products: Aircraft engines

Bristol Siddeley Engines Ltd (BSEL) was a British aero engine manufacturer. The company was formed in 1959 by a merger of Bristol Aero-Engines Limited and Armstrong Siddeley Motors Limited. In 1961 the company was expanded by the purchase of the de Havilland Engine Company and the engine division of Blackburn Aircraft. Bristol Siddeley was purchased by Rolls-Royce Limited in 1966.

== History ==
Bristol Siddeley Engines Limited was formed by the 1 April 1959 merger of Bristol Aero-Engines and Armstrong Siddeley Motors. These were the aero engine manufacturing companies of the Bristol Aeroplane Company and the Hawker Siddeley Group. The share capital of Bristol Siddeley was held in equal proportions by these two parent organisations. At around the same time Bristol's aircraft manufacturing was being subsumed into the British Aircraft Corporation along with those of English Electric and Vickers-Armstrong.

Armstrong Siddeley Motors had been producing aero-engines and motor-cars since it had been formed in 1919 with the merger of Siddeley-Deasy and the Armstrong Whitworth Company. Bristol Aero-Engines had been formed in 1920 when the Bristol Aeroplane Company had taken over the assets of the Cosmos Engineering Company.

On 6 May 1958 Bristol Siddeley Engines Limited was formed as a pilot company to bring about an alliance between the Bristol and Coventry concerns, and a full merger took effect from the beginning of April 1959. The purpose of the new company was to combine the research, engineering and manufacturing resources of the two great component companies to meet the changing demands of the aviation industry.

The company was further strengthened in November 1961 when it acquired the full share capital of the de Havilland Engine Company Limited and Blackburn Engines Limited, both of which were formerly operating within the Hawker Siddeley Group. The aircraft side of Blackburn became part of Hawker Siddeley. Both of these companies had long histories in the aero-engine industry.

The de Havilland Engine Company Limited had the de Havilland Sprite which was a rocket engine with a military type test certificate. In 1954, the company had produced the axial turbojet Gyron of 30,000 lbf (130 kN) thrust, from which was descended the Gyron Junior series. The de Havilland Engine Company's portfolio included the (licensed) Gnome turboshaft. The Blackburn Aeroplane and Motor Company had entered the aero engine field in 1934 when the Cirrus-Hermes Engineering Company became part of the Blackburn and this became the Engine Division of Blackburn Aircraft and subsequently Blackburn Engines Limited. In 1952 an agreement was signed which enabled Blackburn Engines Limited to produce engines based on the Turbomeca range of small gas turbine engines. These were developed for use as airborne auxiliary power units for large aircraft and they were also used as a ground starter unit in the British services.

Bristol Siddeley was bought by Rolls-Royce Limited in 1966 for £63.6 million in order to prevent competition from a planned collaboration between BSEL, Pratt & Whitney and Snecma. Bristol Siddeley retained its own identity and marketing organization.

Bristol Siddeley Engines Limited is still a listed but dormant company within the Rolls-Royce group.

== Products ==
The company was one of the largest of its kind in the world and offered a wider range of engines than any other manufacturer. Aero engines produced by the company included piston engines, turboprops, turboshafts, turbojets, turbofans, auxiliary power units, ramjets and liquid propellant rocket engines. Outside the aeronautical field its products were gas turbines for marine and industrial use, diesel engines, and automatic transmissions.

=== Aero engines ===
The Patchway factory in South Gloucestershire produced military aeroplane engines including the Olympus two-spool turbojet (from which the engine for Concorde was developed), the Orpheus turbojet for the Folland Gnat light fighter/trainer aircraft, the Pegasus two shaft medium bypass ratio vectored thrust turbofan for the Hawker Siddeley P.1127/Kestrel/Harrier VSTOL ground attack aircraft, the Proteus turboprop for the Bristol Britannia airliner and the Viper turbojet for the Hawker Siddeley HS.125. Bristol Siddeley had under development another vectored thrust turbofan, the "plenum chamber burner" (similar to an afterburner) equipped BS100, which was intended for the supersonic Hawker Siddeley P.1154 VSTOL fighter, but the project was cancelled in 1965. The two shaft BS143 was proposed for the MRCA (later the Tornado), but the takeover by RR caused the adoption of the three shaft RB199 instead. Hypersonics were explored in a shock tube near the High Altitude Test Plant (HATP) at Bristol, in support of BS1012 hypersonic engine thinking. High supersonic ramjets for long range defensive missiles were tested in the HATP (Ref TJ102 and TJ151/2).

=== Diesel engines ===
Bristol Siddeley also manufactured diesel engines under licence from the German company Maybach. These were for installation in British Rail Class 42 and Class 52 locomotives which were themselves based on licensed German designs but with as much British-built content as possible. The Maybach Diesel (MD) MD650, MD655 and MD870 series engines built by Bristol Siddeley were sophisticated in design, running at much higher speeds than normal diesels of their size and featured advanced construction such as a disc-webbed crankshaft that ran in large roller bearings, telescopic pipes to deliver cooling oil to the pistons and detachable piston crowns.

The MD engines produced by BSEL included 16 basic engines in the range, which covered powers from 380 to 3,000 horsepower, and includes 4- and 6-cylinder in-line units, and 8, 12 and 16 V units. Each of these were pressure-charged, with or without intercooling. They were used with hydraulic transmission systems, in the Type 4 locos (with two MD650 engines of 1,152 bhp each) hauled the express trains of the Western Region of British Railways - e.g. the Bristolian and the Cornish Riviera. Several hundred more orders were placed by British Rail.(Ref TJ102). MD series engines were widely used in base load, intermittent and standby electricity generating sets, and were transported by rail up to the nominal 1200 kW size for a complete generator set. They were also employed in oil rigs and pumping sets.(Ref TJ151/2).

=== Motor cars ===
When the company was formed it also included the motor car companies Armstrong Siddeley Motors and Bristol Cars. It was soon decided to stop production of Armstrong Siddeley cars, as it was becoming uneconomic, with production of the only product, the Star Sapphire, ending in July 1960. In September 1960 Bristol Cars was sold. Subcontracted production of the Sunbeam Alpine sports car continued at Bristol Siddeley Engines in Coventry until 1962.

== See also ==
- Bristol Aerojet
- Bristol Aerospace

Related lists

- List of aircraft engine manufacturers
- List of aircraft engines

== Sources ==
- Barnes, C.H. Bristol Aircraft since 1910. London, England. Putnam. 1988. ISBN 0-85177-823-2
- Gunston, Bill. World Encyclopedia of Aero Engines. Cambridge, England. Patrick Stephens Limited, 1989. ISBN 1-85260-163-9
- Bristol Siddeley TJ101, July 1960
- Bristol Siddeley TJ102, July 1960
- Bristol Siddeley TJ151/2, December 1962
- British Secret Projects ISBN 978-1-85780-258-0, Ian Allan 2008
