= Rolls-Royce Gnome =

1950s British turboshaft aircraft engine

Gnome
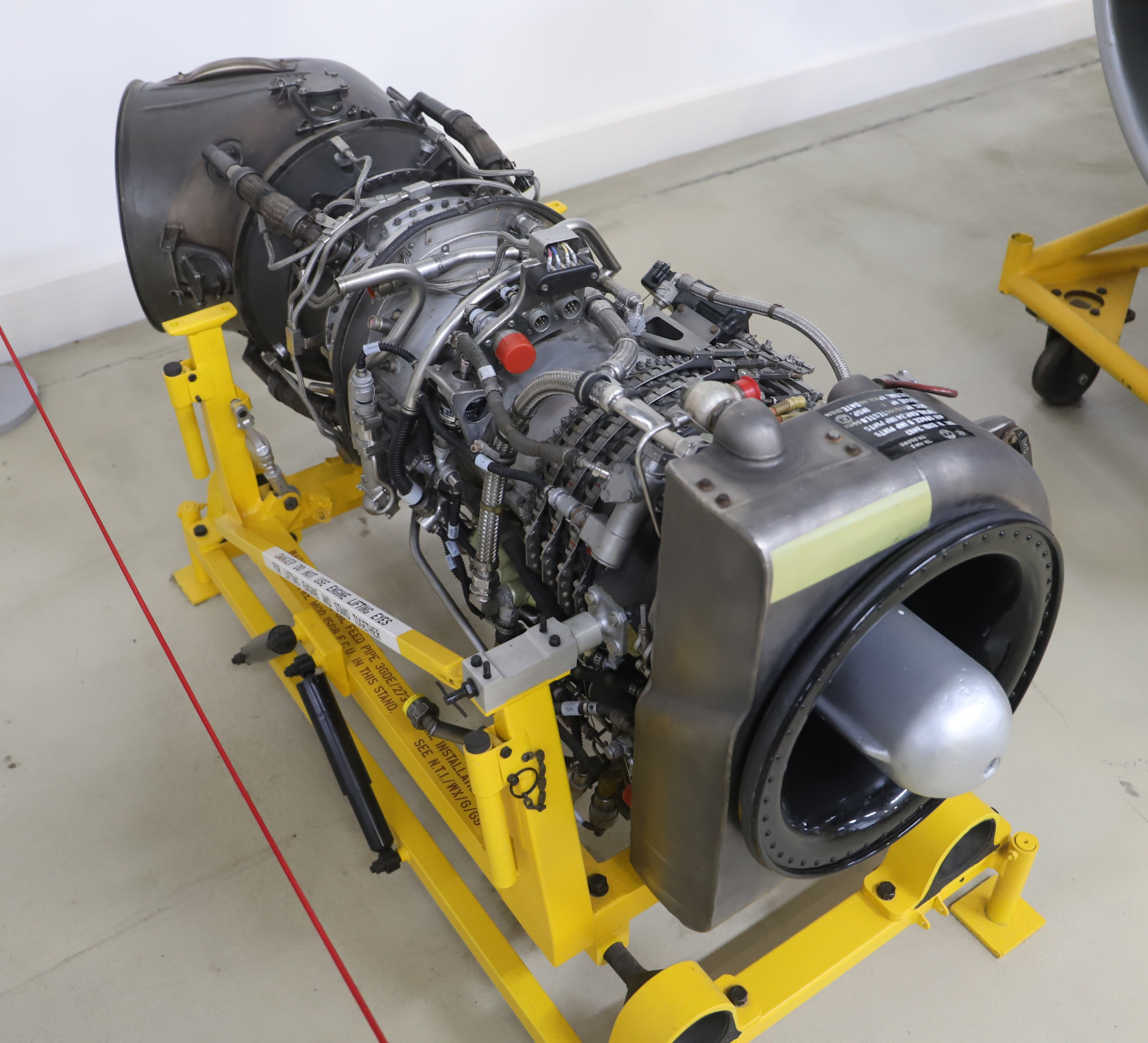
- Rolls-Royce Gnome at the Imperial War Museum Duxford
- Type: Turboshaft
- Manufacturer: de Havilland Engine Company; Bristol Siddeley; Rolls-Royce
- First run: 5 June 1959
- Major applications: Westland Sea King; Westland Wessex; Westland Whirlwind
- Developed from: General Electric T58

The Rolls-Royce Gnome is a British turboshaft engine originally developed by the de Havilland Engine Company as a licence-built General Electric T58, an American mid-1950s design. The Gnome came to Rolls-Royce after their takeover of Bristol Siddeley in 1966, Bristol having absorbed de Havilland Engines Limited in 1961.

A licence to manufacture the T58 was purchased in 1958. The T58 had begun bench testing in 1955 and by 1958 had already been used in helicopters and de Havilland were able to test their first engines in a Westland Whirlwind and Wasp helicopters in August 1959 and March 1960 respectively.

A free-turbine turboshaft, it was used in helicopters such as the Westland Sea King and Westland Whirlwind. The design was sub-licensed to Alfa-Romeo.

There were two series produced: the "H" turboshaft for helicopter use, and the "P" turboprop for fixed-wing aircraft.

== Design and development ==
A two-stage turbine drives the 10 stage all-axial compressor, whilst a single-stage free power turbine drives the load. The combustor is annular. The Gnome differed from the T-58 in having a British developed fuel control system (Lucas).

Because an all-axial design is employed, the final stage compressor rotor blades are amongst the smallest ever manufactured. Normally, a small engine such as this would feature an axial/centrifugal or even a double centrifugal compressor.

The engine was the first developed with a full authority analogue computer, de Havilland Propellers' own, as part of the fuel control system, specifically to anticipate helicopter power demand from pilot control inputs and to limit fuel flow during acceleration to prevent engine surge from occurring.

The system developed relieved the helicopter pilot of the need to control rotor speed directly; it delivered constant rotor speed under varying rotor load. and in this way was the analogue forerunner of all subsequent full authority digital engine control (FADEC) systems worldwide.

== Variants ==
H.1000
(Mk.101) 1,050 shp (780 kW), first production version for use on later marks of Westland Whirlwind
H.1200
1,250 shp (930 kW), the Westland Wessex uses two H.1200, as the Coupled Gnome, with a coupled gearbox with a power limited to 1,550 shp (1,160 kW) at the rotor.
H.1400
1,400 shp (1,000 kW) for the Westland Sea King HAS.1
H.1400-1
1,535 shp (1,145 kW), uprated from the 1400 by increasing the gas-generator speed and using improved blades that can operate at higher temperatures for the Westland Sea King HAS.2.
H.1400-1T
For the Westland Commando HC.4 troop carrier variant of the Westland Sea King
H.1400-2
1,660 shp (1,240 kW) for the Westland Sea King HAS.5.
H.1400-3
1,720 shp (1,280 kW) with new two-stage power turbine.
H.1600
11-stage compressor with 2-stage free power turbine 1,600 hp (1,200 kW)
P.1000
Turboprop version of the H.1000
P.1200
Turboprop version of the H.1200
P.1400-3
Turboprop version of the H.1400-3 rated at 1,700 shp (1,300 kW).
Gnome Mk.101
Gnome Mk.110
Handed H.1200 engines for Coupled Gnome units used in Westland Wessex helicopters.
Gnome Mk.111
Handed H.1200 engines for Coupled Gnome units used in Westland Wessex helicopters.
Gnome Mk.112
Handed H.1200 engines for Coupled Gnome units used in Westland Wessex HU.5 helicopters.
Gnome Mk.113
Handed H.1200 engines for Coupled Gnome units used in Westland Wessex HU.5 helicopters.
Gnome Mk.501
Civilianised H.1000.
Gnome Mk.510
Civilianised H.1000.
Gnome Mk.610
Civilianised H.1200.
Gnome Mk.640
Civilianised H.1200.
Gnome Mk.640A
Civilianised H.1200.
Gnome Mk 660
Used in the civilian Westland Wessex 60 helicopter variant of Wessex HC.2
Coupled Gnome
Twin engines driving through a common gearbox to a single output.

== Applications ==
- Agusta A.101
- AgustaBell AB204B
- Agusta-Bell 205BG
- Kawasaki KV-107 (Swedish Navy only)
- Saunders-Roe SR.N5 hovercraft
- Saunders-Roe SR.N6 hovercraft
- Vertol 107
- Westland Sea King and Commando
- Westland Wessex
- Westland Whirlwind

== Engines on display ==
Rolls-Royce Gnome engines are on display at the following museums:

- Caernarfon Airworld Aviation Museum
- City of Norwich Aviation Museum in Horsham St Faith, Norfolk.
- de Havilland Aircraft Museum
- The Helicopter Museum (Weston)
- Imperial War Museum Duxford
- London Science Museum
- South Yorkshire Aircraft Museum
- Trenchard Museum RAF Halton, Halton, Buckinghamshire, displayed as cutaway

University of Aberdeen

== Specifications (Gnome H1400-1) ==
Data from Jane's All the World's Aircraft 1982-83

==== General characteristics ====
- Type: Turboshaft
- Length: 1,392 mm (54.8 in)
- Diameter: 549 mm (21.6 in)
- Dry weight: 148 kg (326 lb) (ungeared)

==== Components ====
- Compressor: Ten-stage axial flow, variable incidence inlet guide vanes and first three stages of stator
- Combustors: Annular
- Turbine: Two-stage compressor turbine, single-stage free power turbine

==== Performance ====
- Maximum power output: 1,238 kW (1,660 shp) max contingency
- Overall pressure ratio: 8.4:1
- Air mass flow: 6.26 kg (13.8 lb) per second
- Power-to-weight ratio: 5.1 shp/lb

== See also ==
Related development

- General Electric T58

Comparable engines

- Klimov TV2-117
- Lycoming T53

Related lists

- List of aircraft engines
