= Short Sperrin =

Experimental jet bomber in Britain

SA.4 Sperrin
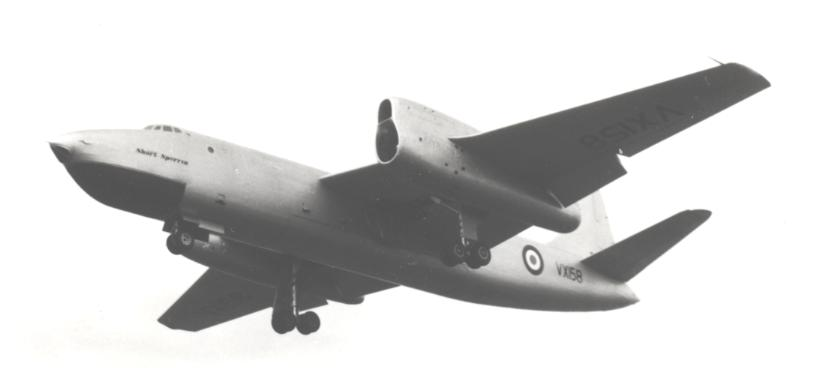
- Short Sperrin Gyron test bed (lower port engine) at Farnborough September 1955

General information
- Type: Experimental aircraft
- Manufacturer: Short Brothers and Harland, Belfast
- Status: Retired from experimental service
- Primary user: Royal Air Force (intended)
- Number built: 2

History
- First flight: First prototype: 10 August 1951; Second prototype: 12 August 1952
- Retired: First prototype: 1958; Second prototype: 1957

The Short SA.4 Sperrin (named after the Sperrin Mountains) was a British jet bomber design of the early 1950s, built by Short Brothers and Harland of Belfast. It first flew in 1951. From the outset, the design had been viewed as a fall-back option in case the more advanced strategic bomber aircraft, then in development to equip the Royal Air Force's nuclear-armed V bomber force, experienced delays; the Sperrin was not put into production because these swept-wing designs, such as the Vickers Valiant, were by then available.

As their usefulness as an interim bomber aircraft did not emerge, a pair of flying prototypes were instead used to gather research data on large jet aircraft and to support the development of other technologies, such as several models of jet engines. The two aircraft completed were retired in the late 1950s and scrapped sometime thereafter.

== Development ==
The Air Ministry issued a specification on 11 August 1947 B.14/46 for a "medium-range bomber landplane" that could carry a "10,000 pound [4,500 kilogram] bomb load to a target 1,500 nautical miles [2,780 kilometres] from a base which may be anywhere in the world", with the stipulation it should be simple enough to maintain at overseas bases. The requirements also included a weight of 140,000 pounds (64 tonnes). This request would become the foundation of the Royal Air Force's V bombers, Britain's airborne nuclear deterrent.

At the same time, the British authorities felt there was a need for an independent strategic bombing capability—in other words that they should not be reliant upon the United States Strategic Air Command. In late 1948, the Air Ministry issued their specification B.35/46 for an advanced jet bomber that would serve as a successor to the Avro Lincoln, the then-standard heavy aircraft of RAF Bomber Command, and that it should be the equal of anything that either the Soviet Union or the United States would have. The exact requirements included that the fully laden weight would be under 100,000 pounds (45.36 tonnes), the ability to fly to a target 1,500 nautical miles (1,700 mi; 2,800 km) distant at 500 knots (580 mph; 930 km/h) with a service ceiling of 50,000 ft (15,000 m) and again that it should be simple enough to maintain at overseas bases. A further stipulation that a nuclear bomb (a "special" in RAF terminology), weighing 10,000 lb (4,500 kg) and measuring 30 ft (9.1 m) in length and 10 ft (3.0 m) in diameter, could be accommodated. The Air Ministry accepted that the requirement might prove to be difficult to achieve in the time-scale required and prepared for a fall-back position by re-drafting B.14/46 as an "insurance" specification against failure to speedily develop the more advanced types that evolved into the Vickers Valiant, Avro Vulcan and Handley Page Victor. B.35/46 was to be a less ambitious conventional type of aircraft, with un-swept wings and some sacrifice in performance.

The only significant performance differences between the revised B.14/46 and the more advanced B.35/46 were a lower speed for the former of 435 knots (501 mph; 806 km/h) and a lower height over the target of 35,000 to 45,000 ft (11,000 to 14,000 m). According to aviation authors Bill Gunston and Peter Gilchrist, the specification's rejection of a swept wing was odd for the era, and had been made in order to allow the prospective bomber to be delivered more quickly.

A total of four firms submitted tenders to meet the B.14/46 specification, Shorts' submission was selected as it had been judged to be superior. The selection of Shorts was "astonishing" according to Bill Gunston and Peter Gilchrist, and noted that their submission, while being a sound design, had apparently been subject to luck. Under this requirement, the Air Ministry placed a contract for two flying prototypes and a static airframe with Shorts. The design was known initially by the company designations of S.42 and SA.4; the aircraft would later receive the name "Sperrin".

As the Sperrin was considered to be a possible production aircraft early on, a decision was taken for the two prototypes to be constructed upon production jigs; this served to slow their construction. Bill Gunston and Peter Gilchrist commented that, if a subsequent production order had been issued, an initial operational squadron could have been equipped by late 1953.

== Design ==
Many design elements of the Sperrin had more in common with aircraft of the Second World War than those of the new jet age. The design was relatively straightforward in most aspects, with the exceptions of the flight controls and the unusual engine arrangement: The four engines were mounted in pairs in nacelles mid-wing, one engine being stacked above the other. VX158 had the distinction of being the first aircraft to receive production Rolls-Royce Avon engines; other engines such as improved Avon models and the de Havilland Gyron would also be installed on the two prototypes for test purposes. The airframe was built largely of light aluminium alloys, principally 75ST; the light-alloy stressed-skin had a very smooth surface which contributed to the low drag of the aircraft.

The Sperrin employed a traditional straight wing, although the fixed leading edge was slightly swept and featured curved fillets at the junction with the engine nacelles. The trailing edge had simple flaps inboard of the nacelles and large ailerons outboard; the outer flaps were to incorporate air brakes, but were replaced with split-brakes prior to the first flight. Both the flaps and air brakes were operated hydraulically, with an independent system for emergency actuation. Up to 6,170 imperial gallons (28,000 L) of fuel could be housed in a total of 22 fuel tanks, 14 of these in the wings and 8 in the fuselage; the tanks were pressurized to prevent collapse during fast dives and other manoeuvres. The wing was located in a mid position on the fuselage between the bomb bay and fuselage fuel tanks.

The fuselage of the Sperrin consisted of separate nose, centre, and tail sections, which were constructed as single units; the upper area of the forward fuselage contained the pressurized drum for the crew, while the lower part of the forward fuselage, which initially contained concrete ballast, was intended to house the H2S Mk.9 airborne radar behind a fibreglass radome. There was a flat window for visual aiming. The centre fuselage had four heavy transverse beams, with fixings for the mainplanes. Neither armament nor countermeasures were installed in either of the prototypes; according to Bill Gunston and Peter Gilchrist, the required bombload of 20,000 lb (9,100 kg) would have been easily achievable and could have been increased. Separate bomb bay and camera doors were fitted to suit either aerial reconnaissance or bombing missions.

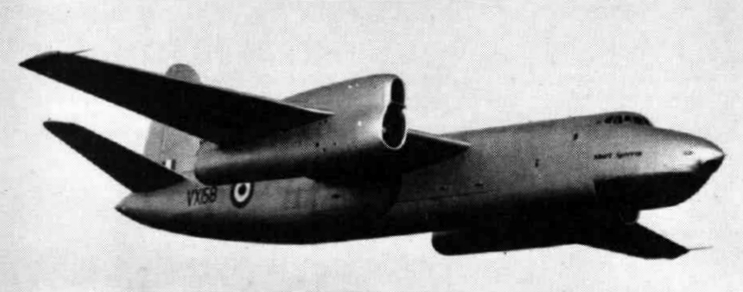
Short Sperrin in flight, 1956

The Sperrin was equipped with a tricycle undercarriage (a twin-wheel nosewheel and a pair of four-wheel bogies). The nose gear retracted backwards and the main gear into the wings towards the fuselage. A safety circuit prevented retraction of the landing gear until a sufficient air speed had been reached. The nose-wheel was steerable which was unusual for a British aircraft, the Sperrin being one of the first British aircraft to be fitted with one; the landing gear was operated by a Messier hydraulic system. A 24/28-volt DC electrical system was supplied by two generators; both generators and a compressor for cabin pressure were driven from two accessory gearboxes that were housed within the wings.

The SA.4 was designed for a crew of five: pilot, copilot, bomb-aimer, navigator and air signaller (later called air electronics officer). The prone bomb aimer's position was a tube extending forward of the cockpit above the radome. It was fitted with an opaque nosecone, as the Sperrin was never used for visual bomb aiming. The pilots were the only crew members to have Martin-Baker ejector seats and these were positioned beneath a jettisonable roof panel; other crew members had to bail out through a door under the navigator's console from their rear-facing positions located behind the pilots. Unusual for an aircraft of this size, the flying controls were manually operated using servo tabs, a feature also used on the Bristol Britannia; artificial feel was also incorporated. Bill Gunston and Peter Gilchrist describe the control system as having been simple, light, reliable, and low-friction and contrast it positively against powered systems of the era.

== Operational history ==
=== Testing ===
The first prototype (serial VX158), powered by four Rolls-Royce Avon RA.2 engines of 6,000 lbf (27 kN) of thrust and piloted by Tom Brooke-Smith, had its maiden flight on 10 August 1951. By this time, in the light of the latest knowledge, and the fact that the Valiant project was now proceeding well and only six months behind the Sperrin the judgement of the Air Ministry was that an insurance project was now no longer needed, and a decision was taken to order the Vickers Valiant instead of the Sperrin and the Sperrin project was cancelled. Construction nevertheless continued on the two prototypes, as the Ministry of Supply determined that the Sperrin would serve as a research aircraft. The second prototype (VX161) flew for the first time on 12 August 1952 with Squadron Leader "Wally" Runciman at the controls, accompanied by Flight Test Development Engineer Malcolm Wild. It was fitted with more powerful Avon RA.3s of 6,500 lbf (29 kN) thrust.

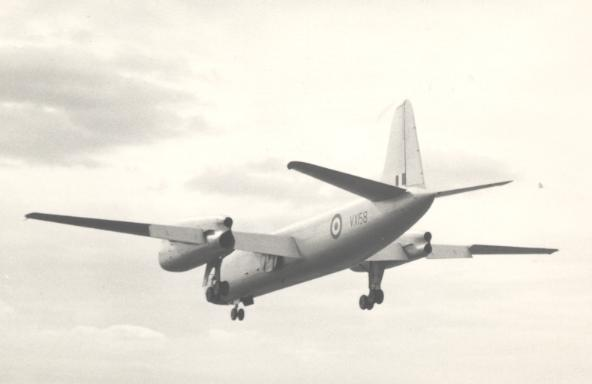
Short Sperrin VX158 landing at Farnborough SBAC Show September 1955. Note the Gyron engine installed in the lower port nacelle

The two Sperrins were used in a variety of research trials through the 1950s, including engine tests using VX158 as a testbed for the de Havilland Gyron turbojet - a large engine delivering 15,000 lbf (67 kN) thrust. The Gyron Gy1 replaced the lower Avon in the port nacelle (see image). For the first flight with this engine configuration on 7 July 1955. VX158 was piloted by Jock Eassie and Chris Beaumont. Testing with this asymmetric engine configuration continued until March 1956, when the single Gyron Gy1 was removed and two Gyron Gy2 engines, each providing 20,000 lbf (89 kN) thrust, were fitted, one in each engine nacelle below the original Avon RA.2s.

The first flight of VX158 with the new engine configuration took place on 26 June 1956, again with "Jock" Eassie and Chris Beaumont at the controls. During this flight the port outer undercarriage cover fell off; VX161 was flown over from Farnborough and its corresponding cover was used to repair VX158. VX161 never flew again and was scrapped at Sydenham in 1957. VX158 was flown at the Farnborough Airshow in 1956 with two Avons and two Gyrons fitted but six months later the Gyron programme was discontinued and VX158 was scrapped at Hatfield in 1958.

A photograph of VX158 with both Gyrons fitted can be seen in C.H. Barnes' and D.N. James' "Shorts Aircraft since 1900".

Among other test work, VX161 (which had a fully operational weapons bay) was involved in trials relating to bomb shapes with mock-ups of the Blue Danube nuclear bomb and the Blue Boar television-guided glider bomb.

== Specifications (first prototype) ==
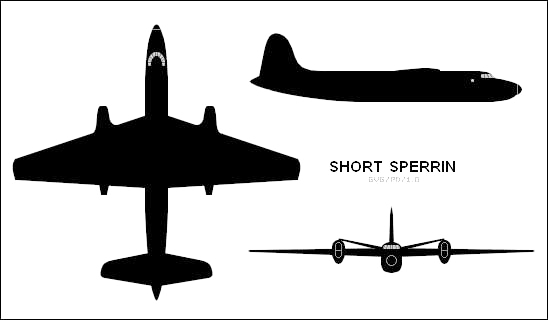
Orthogonal views (silhouette)

Data from Flight International

General characteristics

- Crew: 5 (pilot, co-pilot, bombardier, navigator and radio operator)
- Length: 102 ft 3 in (31.17 m)
- Wingspan: 109 ft 0 in (33.22 m)
- Height: 28 ft 6 in (8.69 m)
- Wing area: 1,896 sq ft (176.1 m^{2})
- Aspect ratio: 6.27:1
- Airfoil: AD.7
- Empty weight: 72,000 lb (32,659 kg)
- Gross weight: 115,000 lb (52,163 kg)
- Fuel capacity: 6,200 imp gal (7,400 US gal; 28,000 L)
- Powerplant: 4 × Rolls-Royce Avon turbojets, 6,500 lbf (29 kN) thrust each

Performance

- Maximum speed: 564 mph (908 km/h, 490 kn) at 15,000 ft (4,600 m)
- Cruise speed: 500 mph (800 km/h, 430 kn) 40,000 ft (12,000 m)
- Combat range: 3,860 mi (6,210 km, 3,350 nmi)
- Service ceiling: 45,000 ft (14,000 m)

Armament

- Bombs: Bomb bay with capacity for 20,000 lb (9,100 kg) bombs

Across the two aircraft, the Sperrin had four different engine configurations:

1. Four Rolls-Royce Avon RA.2 turbojets of 6,000 lbf (27 kN) thrust each: VX158
2. Four Rolls-Royce Avon RA.3 turbojets of 6,500 lbf (29 kN) thrust each: VX161
3. Three Rolls-Royce Avon RA.2 turbojets of 6,000 lbf (27 kN) thrust each (two on the starboard wing, one in the upper part of the port engine nacelle) and one de Havilland Gyron Gy1 turbojet of 15,000 lbf (67 kN) thrust in the lower part of the port engine nacelle: VX158
4. Two Rolls-Royce Avon RA.2 turbojets combined with two de Havilland Gyron Gy2 turbojets of 20,000 lbf (89 kN) thrust each: VX158

== See also ==
External videos
- Short Sperin at the 1951 Farnborough Air Show

Aircraft of comparable role, configuration, and era

- Convair XB-46
- Ilyushin Il-22
- Ilyushin Il-46
- Martin XB-48
- North American B-45

Related lists

- List of bomber aircraft
