= Bristol 188 =

British supersonic research aircraft

Bristol Type 188
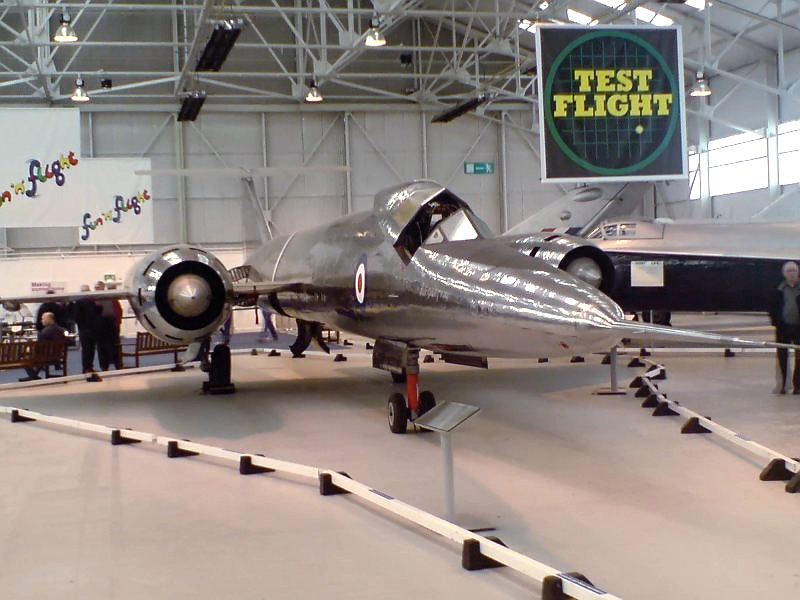
- Bristol Type 188 XF926 at the Royal Air Force Museum Cosford

General information
- Type: Experimental aircraft
- Manufacturer: Bristol Aeroplane Company
- Status: Experimental
- Primary user: Royal Aircraft Establishment
- Number built: 3 (one static test, two flight test prototypes)

History
- First flight: 14 April 1962
- Retired: 1964

The Bristol Type 188 is a supersonic research aircraft designed and produced by the British aircraft manufacturer Bristol Aeroplane Company. It was nicknamed the Flaming Pencil in reference to its length and relatively slender cross-section as well as its intended purpose.

The Type 188 was developed as part of supporting research efforts for the Avro 730, a later-cancelled bomber capable of Mach 3 flight. Its purpose was to explore high-speed, high-temperature flights; for the latter purpose, it made use of unconventional materials, such as large quantities of stainless steel, as well as the incorporation of an active refrigeration system. To work with this material, relatively exotic puddle welding fabrication techniques were employed along with extensive technical support from external companies. As part of its intended test programme, the Type 188 was designed with flexible engine installations that allowed for the fitting of different air intakes, engines, and propelling nozzles. It was also furnished with extensive electronic sensors, data recording, and telemetry apparatus. A total of three aircraft were constructed – a single static test frame along with two (constructor numbers 13518 and 13519) flight-capable aircraft; various scale models were also produced.

During May 1960, the first airframe was delivered to the Royal Aircraft Establishment (RAE) at Farnborough. The maiden flight of the Type 188 occurred on 14 April 1962. Flight testing encountered numerous problems, including the excessive fuel consumption of the De Havilland Gyron Junior engines used, which did not permit the aircraft to fly at high speeds long enough to evaluate the "thermal soaking" of the airframe, one of the main research areas of the project. Across 51 flights, the Type 188 attained a maximum speed of Mach 1.88 (1,240 mph; 2,000 km/h) at 36,000 ft (11,000 m).

During early 1964, it was announced that all activity involving the Type 188 was to be terminated. The project had cost £20 million by the end of the programme, making it the most expensive research aircraft ever developed in Britain at that time. The technical data and knowledge garnered from the Type 188 was put to use in other British high-speed aerospace efforts, most notably the development of Concorde supersonic transport, as well as the Bristol (later Rolls-Royce) Olympus 593 powerplant, which powered both Concorde and the BAC TSR-2 bomber. During the late 1960s, it had been intended for both of the Type 188 fuselages to be used as targets for gunnery trials at the Proof and Experimental Establishment at Shoeburyness, Essex; however, XF926 was subsequently transported to RAF Cosford, initially to act as instructional airframe 8368M, it has since been preserved at the Royal Air Force Museum Cosford in Shropshire.

== Design and development ==
The Bristol Type 188 had its genesis in Operational Requirement 330, which sought a Mach 3 reconnaissance aircraft, which eventually developed into the Avro 730. Air Ministry officials recognised that, as the Avro 730 was expected to operate at high speeds for extended periods, more data was needed on high-speed operations. To fulfil this need, the follow-on Operational Requirement ER.134T was issued in February 1953; it called for a flying testbed capable of attaining speeds in excess of Mach 2. This aircraft was expected to run at these speeds for extended periods to permit the study of kinetic heating effects on such an aircraft. Furthermore, it was also expected to operate for a considerable amount of time with a skin temperature around 300 Celsius.

Several of Britain's aircraft manufacturers took interest in this advanced specification, Bristol Aircraft being specifically invited to tendered by ministry officials. The company's design team opted to produce a clean-sheet aircraft design, which was assigned the internal designation Type 188. The submitted design was somewhat vague and even speculative in several aspects; the aircraft's layout was not firmly decided upon until as late as 1955. Nevertheless, following a competitive review of submissions, the associated contract 6/Acft/10144 was awarded to Bristol in February 1953.

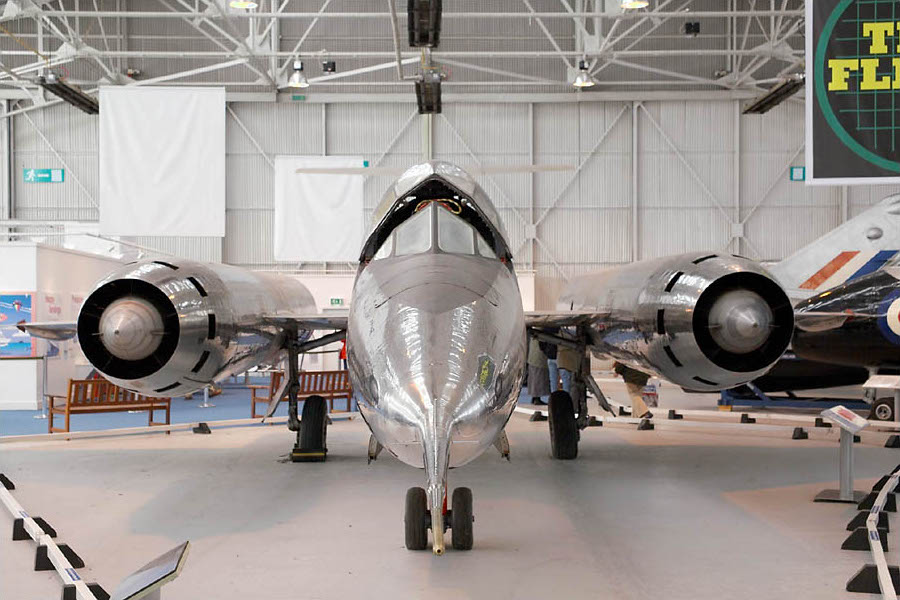
Bristol Type 188 on static display at the Royal Air Force Museum Midlands, Cosford.

The advanced nature of the aircraft meant that new construction methods had to be developed. Several materials were considered for construction and two specialist grades of steel were selected: a titanium-stabilized 18-8 austenitic steel and a 12%-Cr steel used in gas turbines (Firth-Vickers Rex 448). These had to be manufactured to better tolerances in sufficient quantities for construction to start. The 12% chromium stainless steel with a honeycomb centre was used for the construction of the outer skin, to which no paint was applied. However, simply procuring sufficient amounts of stainless steel sheeting was a challenge, only compounded by factors such as the desired strength and uniformity.

While traditional riveting was considered to be a potential construction method, however, this posed substantially difficulties as every rivet, bolts, and screws used would have had to be specially manufactured out of compatible materials to ensure the necessary tolerances were met. Instead, an advanced technique of arc welding using an argon gas shield, known as puddle welding, was used. Another British aircraft manufacturer, the W. G. Armstrong Whitworth company, provided substantial technical help and support to Bristol during this period; they had also explored the use of puddle welding for advanced aerospace purposes. Armstrong Whitworth produced major sections of the airframe as a subcontractor.

A fused-quartz windscreen and canopy and cockpit refrigeration system were designed and fitted, but were never tested in the environment for which they had been designed. The pilot was provided with a conventional ejector seat. All of the flight controls, along with elements such as the undercarriage and four-part air brakes, were hydraulically powered. The main undercarriage elements retracted inwards to lie vertically within the fuselage aft of the main spar, while the forward undercarriage retracted forwards into a space directly aft of the cockpit. The majority of the oval-shaped fuselage's internal volume was occupied by the fuel tanks; a large compartment forward of the wing housed the suite of electronic recording and telemetry apparatus along with elements of the refrigeration system.

Among the various specification requirements were engine installations which permitted the fitting of different air intakes, engines and propelling nozzles. The Type 188 was originally intended to be powered by a pair of Rolls-Royce Avon engines, however, these were substituted for a pair of De Havilland Gyron Junior engines (each of which was half a ton lighter) in June 1957. This change of engines necessitated some configuration changes, including the mounting of the engines further forward along with elongated nacelles and jet pipes. The Gyron Junior was then under development for the Saunders-Roe SR.177 supersonic interceptor and incorporated a fully variable reheat arrangement, making it one of the first engines in the world to give continuous variation in thrust from idle to max reheat. This choice of powerplant resulted in the Type 188 having a typical endurance of only 25 minutes, not long enough to conduct the high-speed research tests that were required of it. Chief Test Pilot Godfrey L. Auty reported that while the Type 188 transitioned smoothly from subsonic to supersonic flight, the Gyron Junior engines were prone to surging beyond that speed, causing the aircraft to pitch and yaw.

In order to solve the aerodynamic and flutter problems identified, a large number of scale models were produced and tested. Some of these models were mounted on converted rocket boosters and used to conduct free-flight investigations, multiple such launches were conducted from RAE Aberporth. As a result of these tests, along with wind tunnel testing, various aerodynamic refinements and alterations were made to the Type 188's design. As a result, a largely rectangular wing plan was adopted between the engine nacelles alongside horn-balanced ailerons on the compact outer wings; the all-moving tailplane was also raised to the top of the fin while the chord was extended to accommodate single-engine failure during take-off.

It was ultimately decided that three aircraft would be built, one as a static test frame and two (constructor numbers 13518 and 13519) for flight testing. On 4 January 1954, under contract number KC/2M/04/CB.42(b), the serial numbers XF923 and XF926 were given to the two aircraft. To support the development of the Avro 730 Mach 3 reconnaissance bomber, another three aircraft were ordered (Serial Numbers XK429, XK434 and XK436). However, this follow-up order was cancelled shortly after the Avro 730 programme was itself terminated during 1957 as part of that year's review of defence spending. Nonetheless, the Type 188 project was continued for some time as a high speed research aircraft.

== Operational history ==
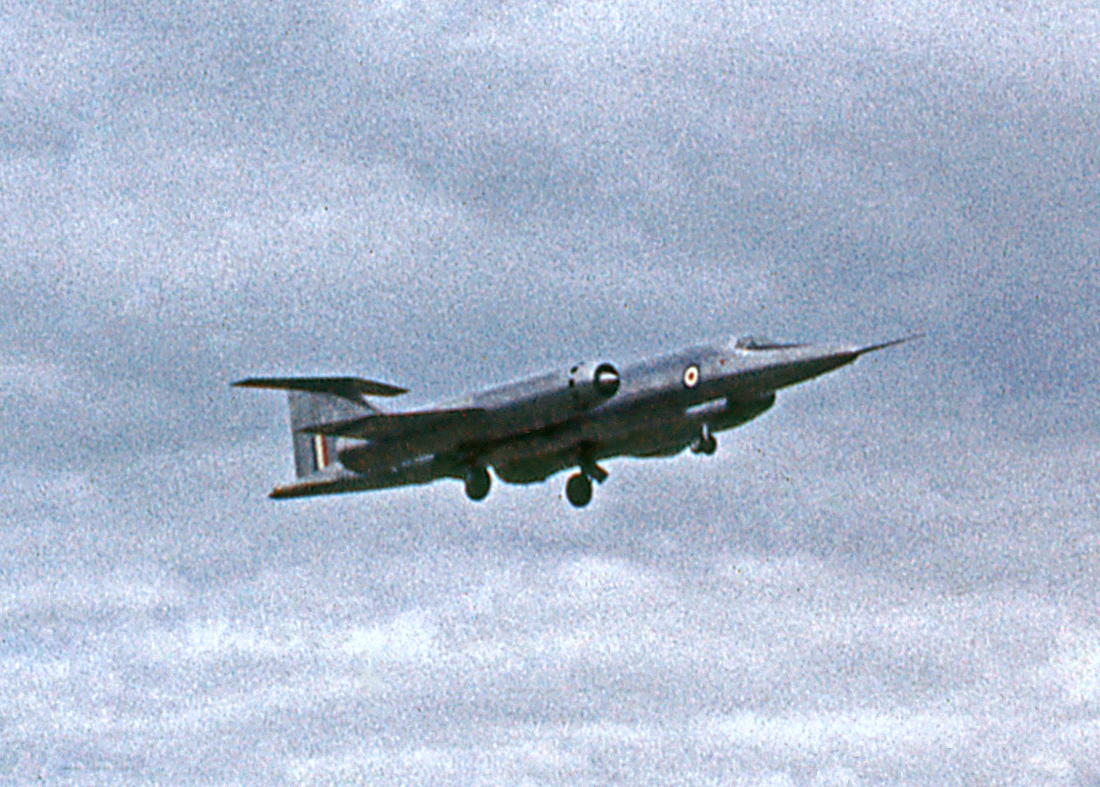
The first prototype Bristol Type 188 landing at Farnborough after giving a public display at the 1962 SBAC Show

During May 1960, the first airframe was delivered to the Royal Aircraft Establishment at Farnborough, where it underwent a series of structural tests, both heated and unheated, before it was transferred to RAE Bedford. On 26 April 1961, XF923 undertook the first taxiing trials, after which it was promptly put through extensive pre-flight testing. Due to problems encountered with the initial design of the intake, the maiden flight of the Type 188 did not take place until 14 April 1962. XF923 was intended to remain with Bristol for its initial flights and evaluation before turning it over to the MoA. XF926 had its first flight, powered by XF923s engines, on 26 April 1963; XF926 was given over to RAE Bedford for its flying programme.

Across 51 flights, the Type 188 reached a top speed of Mach 1.88 at 36,000 ft (11,000 m). The longest subsonic flight lasted only 48 minutes, which was largely due to 70 percent of the aircraft's total fuel capacity being consumed just to attain its operational altitude.

In September 1962, the first prototype made its first public appearance, being displayed on both the ground and in the air at that year's Farnborough Air Show. During that same year, the aircraft was seen in the film Some People.

Measurements during testing were collected and, in addition to being recorded onboard, were transmitted to a ground station for live review as well as being recording and subsequently analysed. The ground station was typically manned by both an engineer and a "ground pilot"; the extent of the flight information transmitted permitted the ground pilot to comprehensively advise the pilot of the aircraft in real time, although it was convention for only key information to be communicated as such to avoid excessive distraction to the pilot flying.

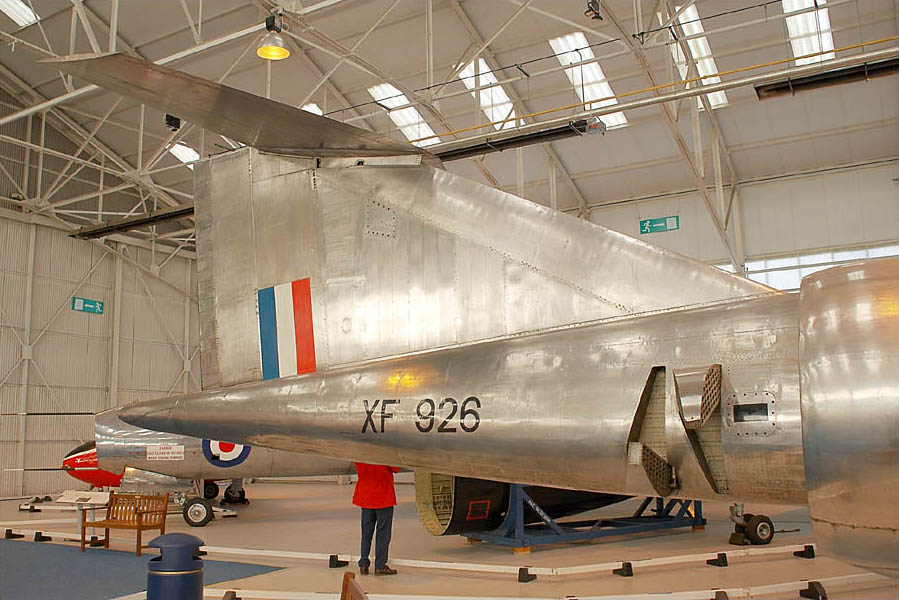
Bristol Type 188 at the Royal Air Force Museum Midlands, Cosford

Flight testing of the Type 188 encountered a number of problems, perhaps the principal being that the fuel consumption of the Gyron Junior engines used did not permit the aircraft to fly at high speeds long enough to evaluate the "thermal soaking" of the airframe, which was one of the main research areas that the Type 188 had been built to investigate. Combined with fuel leaks, the inability to reach its design speed of Mach 2 and a takeoff speed at nearly 300 mph (480 km/h) severely compromised the flight testing phase of the project. Nonetheless, although the Type 188 programme was eventually abandoned, the knowledge and technical information gained was put to some use for the future Concorde program. The inconclusive nature of the research into the use of stainless steel led to Concordes being constructed from conventional aluminium alloys with a Mach limit of 2.2. Experience gained with the Gyron Junior engine, which was the first British gas turbine designed for sustained supersonic operation, additionally later assisted with the development of the Bristol (later Rolls-Royce) Olympus 593 powerplant, which was used on both Concorde and the BAC TSR-2.

During early 1964, it was announced that all development activity on the Type 188 was to be terminated. The final flight of XF926 took place on 12 January 1964. In total, the project cost £20 million. By the end of the programme, considered the most expensive to date for a research aircraft in Britain, XF923 had to be "cannibalised" in order to keep the other airframe flightworthy.

== Surviving aircraft ==
In April 1966, both Type 188 fuselages were transported to the Proof and Experimental Establishment at Shoeburyness, Essex to act as targets for gunnery trials, but during 1972, XF926 was dismantled and moved to RAF Cosford (without its engines) to act as instructional airframe 8368M, and is preserved at the Royal Air Force Museum Cosford in Shropshire. XF923 was subsequently scrapped at Foulness.

== Operators ==
United Kingdom

- Royal Aircraft Establishment

== Specifications ==
Data from The World's Worst Aircraft: From Pioneering Failures to Multimillion Dollar Disasters, Bristol Aircraft since 1910

General characteristics

- Crew: 1
- Length: 77 ft 8 in (23.67 m)
- Wingspan: 35 ft 1 in (10.69 m)
- Height: 12 ft 0 in (3.66 m)
- Wing area: 396 sq ft (36.8 m^{2})
- Airfoil: Biconvex 4%
- Powerplant: 2 × de Havilland DGJ.10R Gyron Junior afterburning turbojet engines, 10,000 lbf (44 kN) thrust each

14,000 lbf (62 kN) with afterburner at sea level
20,000 lbf (89 kN) with afterburner at 36,000 ft (11,000 m)

Performance

- Maximum speed: 1,043 kn (1,200 mph, 1,932 km/h) + (design goal)
- Maximum speed: Mach 2

== Notable appearances in media ==
Bristol 188 XF923 was prominently featured in Some People (1962), a feature film primarily shot in Bristol.

== See also ==
Aircraft of comparable role, configuration, and era

- Tsybin RSR
