= De Havilland Aircraft Museum =

de Havilland Aircraft Museum
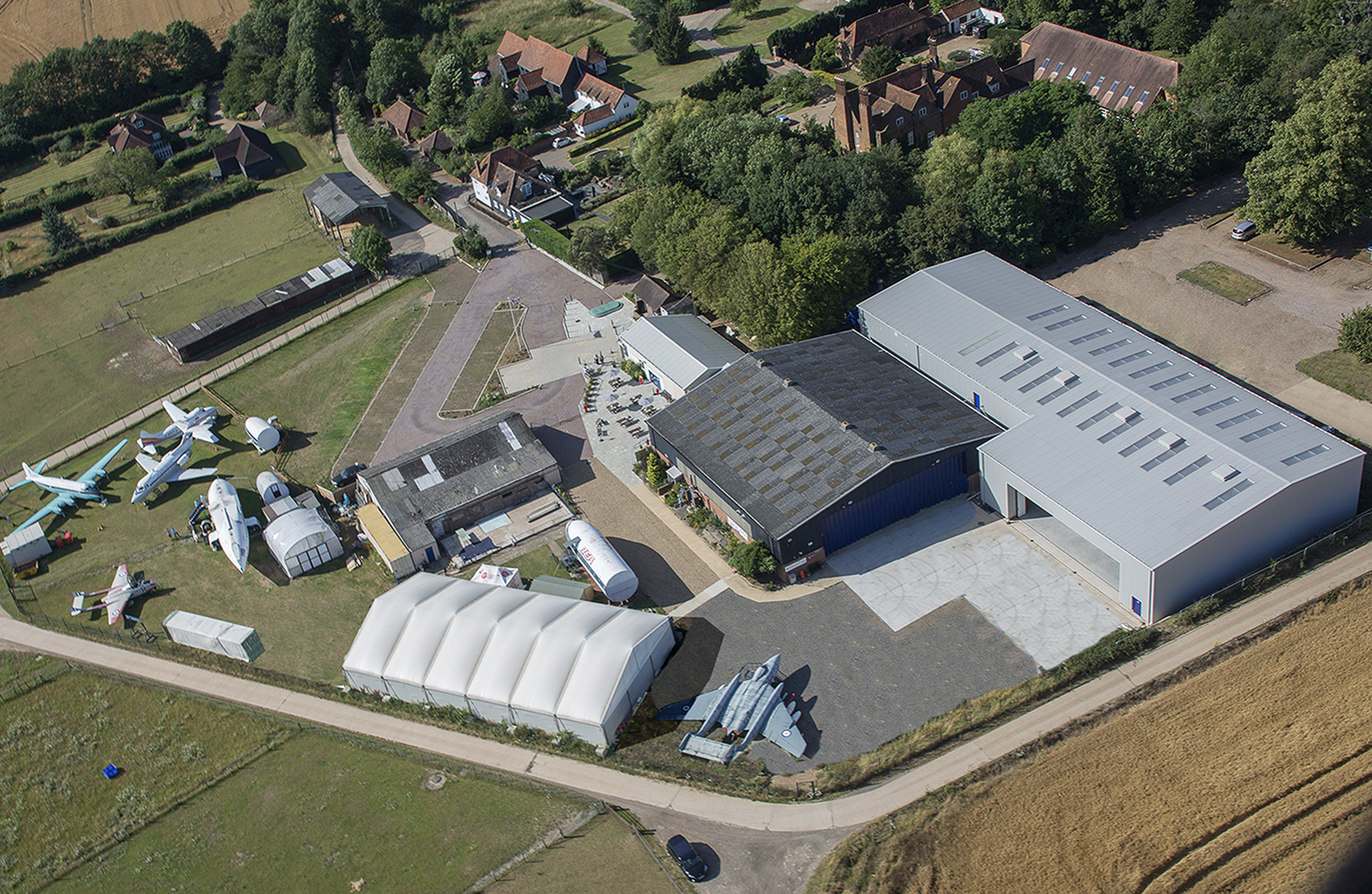

- Location within Hertfordshire
- Former name: Mosquito Aircraft Museum; de Havilland Aircraft Heritage Centre
- Established: 1959
- Location: London Colney, Hertfordshire, United Kingdom
- Coordinates: 51.710833°N 0.271111°W
- Type: Aviation museum
- Website: dehavillandmuseum.co.uk

The de Havilland Aircraft Museum, formerly the de Havilland Aircraft Heritage Centre, is a volunteer-run aviation museum in London Colney, Hertfordshire, UK.

The Museum's mission is to preserve and communicate the de Havilland Heritage to ensure that current and future generations of all ages will understand de Havilland’s contribution to innovative British Aviation technology.

The collection was originally built around the definitive prototype and restoration shops for the de Havilland Mosquito and now also includes several examples of the de Havilland Vampire – the third operational jet aircraft in the world. The museum is the largest such museum devoted to one manufacturer in the country.

== History ==
=== Salisbury Hall ===
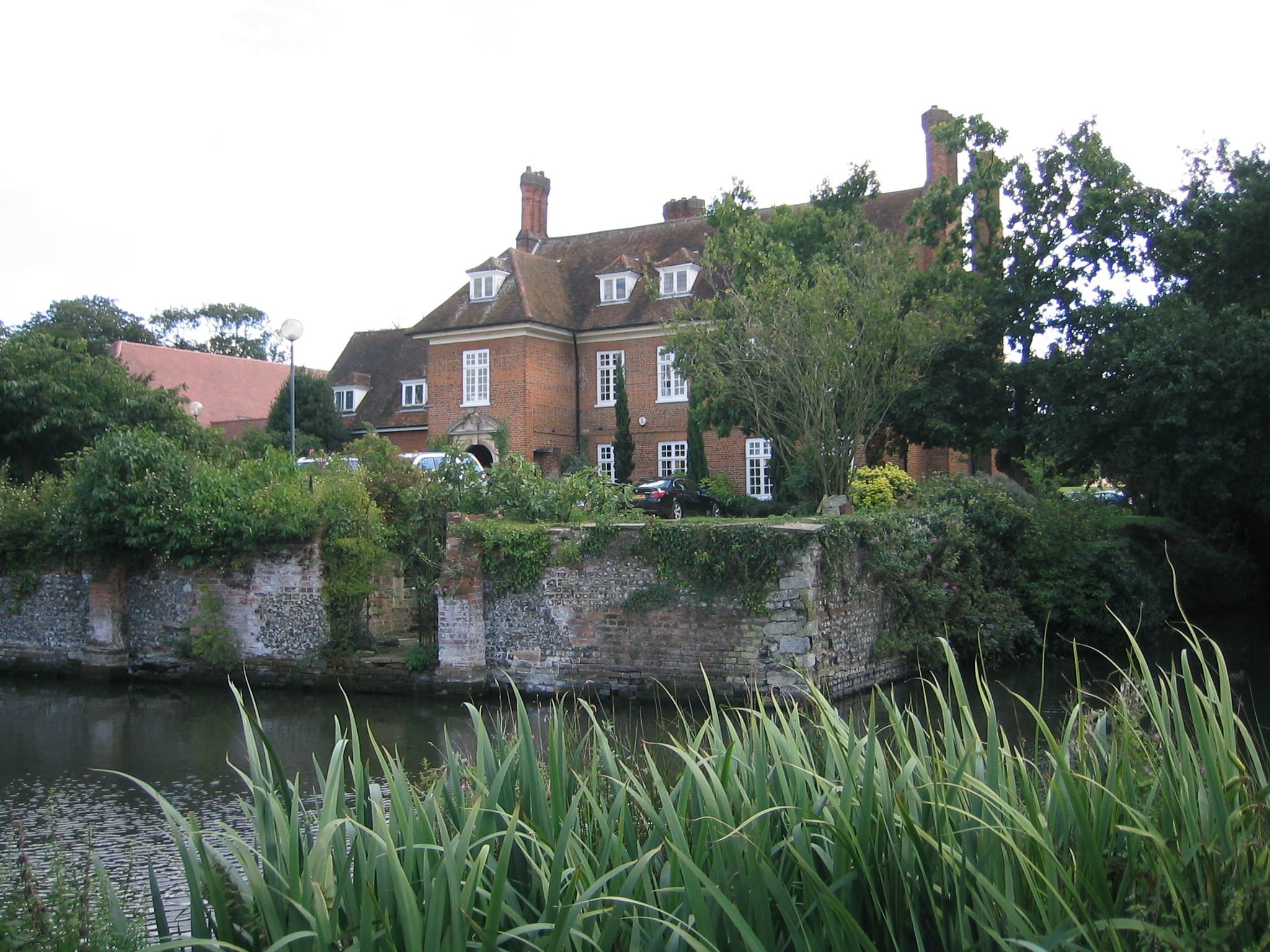
Salisbury Hall

The site has been occupied by a number of large manor houses since the 9th century. The present house was built around 1668 by the London banker James Hoare, bringing with it associations with Charles II and Nell Gwynne, who lived in a cottage by the bridge to the Hall. The Hall subsequently passed through various hands, and during the latter part of the 19th century was occupied by a succession of farmers. However, about 1905 Lady Randolph Churchill, as Mrs Cornwallis West, came here to live. Her son, Winston Churchill, became a regular visitor.

During the 1930s, Sir Nigel Gresley, of the London and North Eastern Railway, was in residence. He was responsible for the A4 Pacific steam locomotives, one of which, Mallard, still holds the world speed record for steam locomotives of 126 mph (203 km/h). It is believed that the locomotive was named after the ducks in the moat.

In September 1939, the de Havilland Aircraft Company established the Mosquito design team in the Hall, the prototype Mosquito, E0234/W4050, subsequently being built in the adjacent buildings, to the side of Salisbury Hall. These have since been demolished.

After the acquisition of Airspeed Ltd by de Havilland Aircraft Company Airspeed Ltd assembled a design team, headed by aircraft designer Hessell Tiltman. Tiltman's design efforts were initially carried out at the de Havilland technical school at Hatfield, Hertfordshire, before relocating to Salisbury Hall, London Colney. The Airspeed building were behind Salisbury Hall and have since been demolished. Part of the site of the former Airspeed Ltd building is now covered by the new Geoffrey de Havilland Hangar.

After de Havilland left in 1947 the Hall slipped into a derelict condition.

When Walter Goldsmith, a retired army major, purchased Salisbury Hall, he soon came to realise that it had been used by de Havilland during the war. On contacting Bill Baird, then in charge of PR at de Havilland at Hatfield, he discovered that the company had used it as the design centre for the Mosquito, and that Baird had squirrelled the original prototype away in the Fiddlebridge stores, just off the airfield at Hatfield. Having resisted several calls to burn the aircraft, Baird was delighted to find someone who could offer the old aircraft a home. de Havilland carried out basic restoration work at Hatfield, and Goldsmith accepted the aircraft back at Salisbury Hall in 1959.

=== Prototype Mosquito and early exhibits ===
The prototype Mosquito became the first aircraft to be displayed at Salisbury Hall, and was followed by examples of the de Havilland Vampire and Venom in 1968. In 1970, the collection was joined by a further example of the de Havilland Mosquito, which had been donated by Liverpool Corporation, following its use in the film Mosquito Squadron.

The collection was later expanded, with examples of the single-seat Vampire, Sea Venom, Sea Vixen, Chipmunk and Dove all arriving by 1978. Additionally, the fuselage of a Mosquito FB6 arrived in 1976; it is now the only survivor of the most numerous sub-type to be preserved in Europe. The museum houses the fuselage of the last surviving square-windowed de Havilland Comet 1, the world's first jet airliner.

=== Later history ===
The supporters' society has been responsible for the restoration and conservation of many of the exhibits, starting with the Chipmunk in 1978, an airframe which was subsequently restored by members once more between 2003 and 2007. The supporters were also active in building a hangar to house the ex-Liverpool Mosquito in 1980, and then completely restoring the aircraft, a task they completed in 1990. The supporters' society has also been responsible for work on a Tiger Moth, Hornet Moth, Mosquito 6, Heron, Dove, several Vampires and many other aircraft in the collection.

In 2001, it was recognised that the prototype Mosquito was in dire need of conservation work. This work was supported by BAE Systems. and the Heritage Lottery fund. The prototype Mosquito restoration was completed in December 2015 almost to the minute of its 75th anniversary. It is now on display with the other two Mosquitos in the Walter Goldsmith Hangar.

In January 2016 the museum opened a new hangar initially named the Geoffrey de Havilland Hangar. This hangar was later renamed the Amy Johnson Hangar when the new hangar opened and is now used for workshops where the public can see the volunteers working on museum projects.

The museum opened the new Sir Geoffrey de Havilland Hangar in February 2020.

== Collection ==
=== Aircraft on display ===
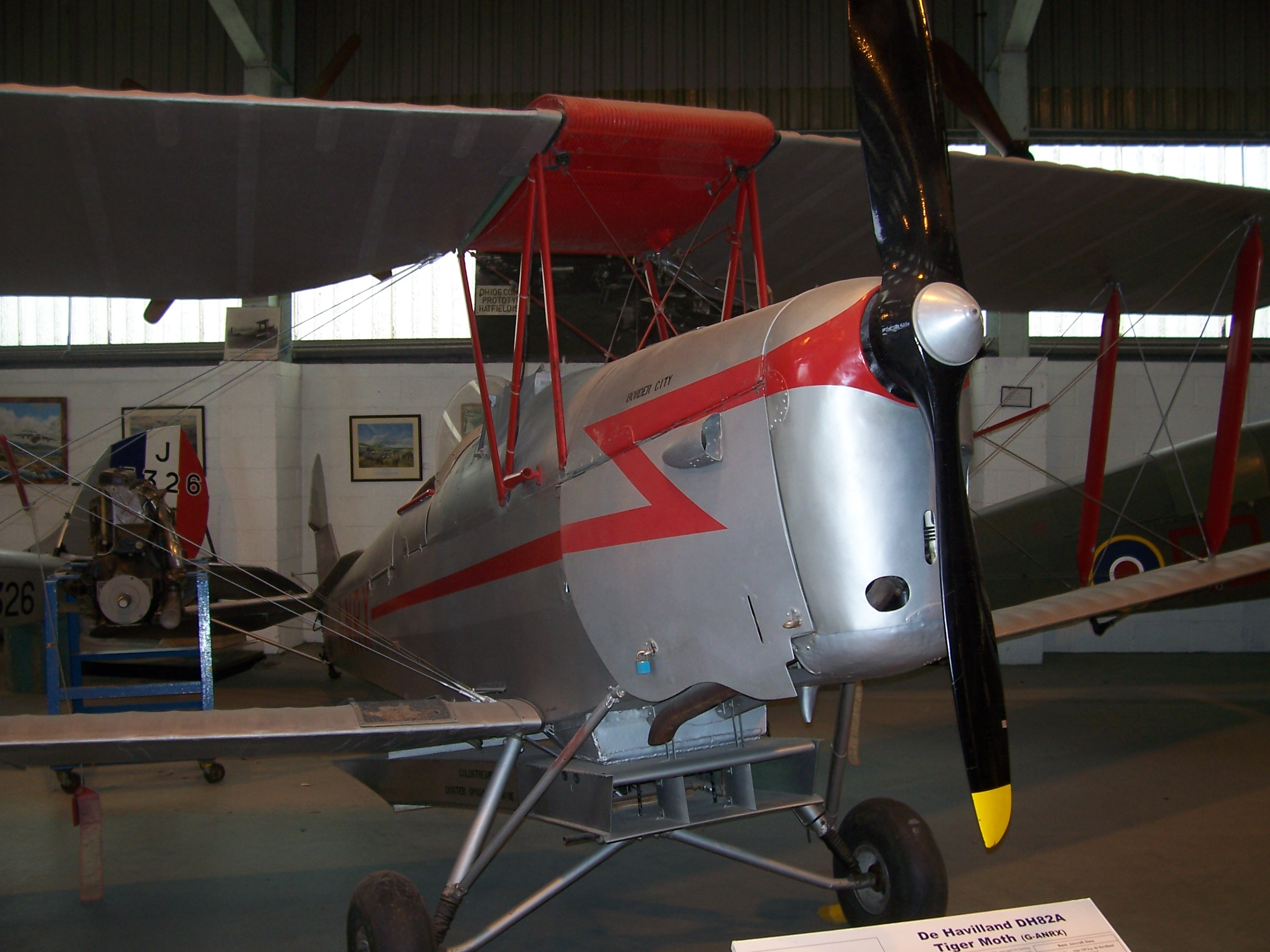
DH.82 Tiger Moth, G-ANRX, with crop spraying equipment

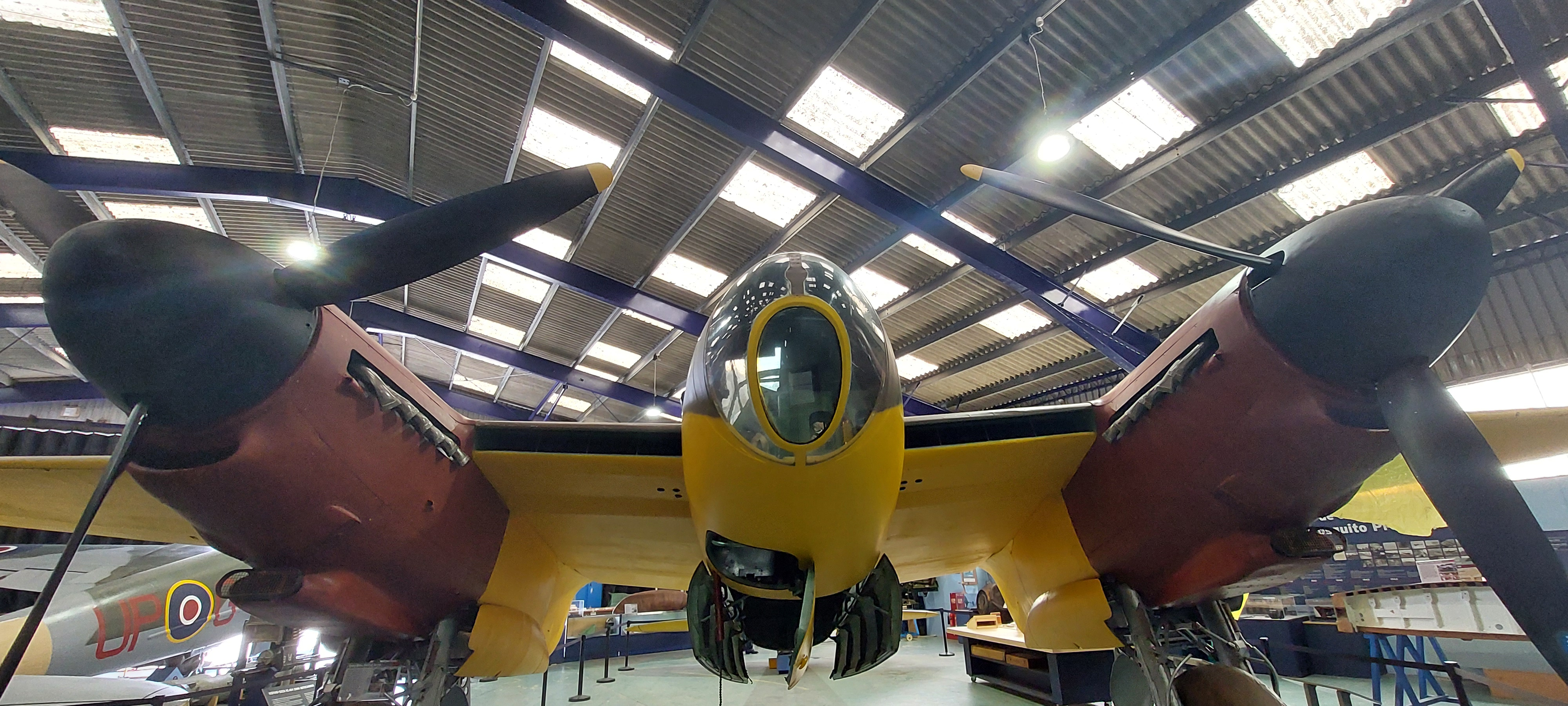
DH.98 Mosquito Prototype W4050 photographed in the main hangar at the de Havilland Aircraft Museum in London Colney, UK

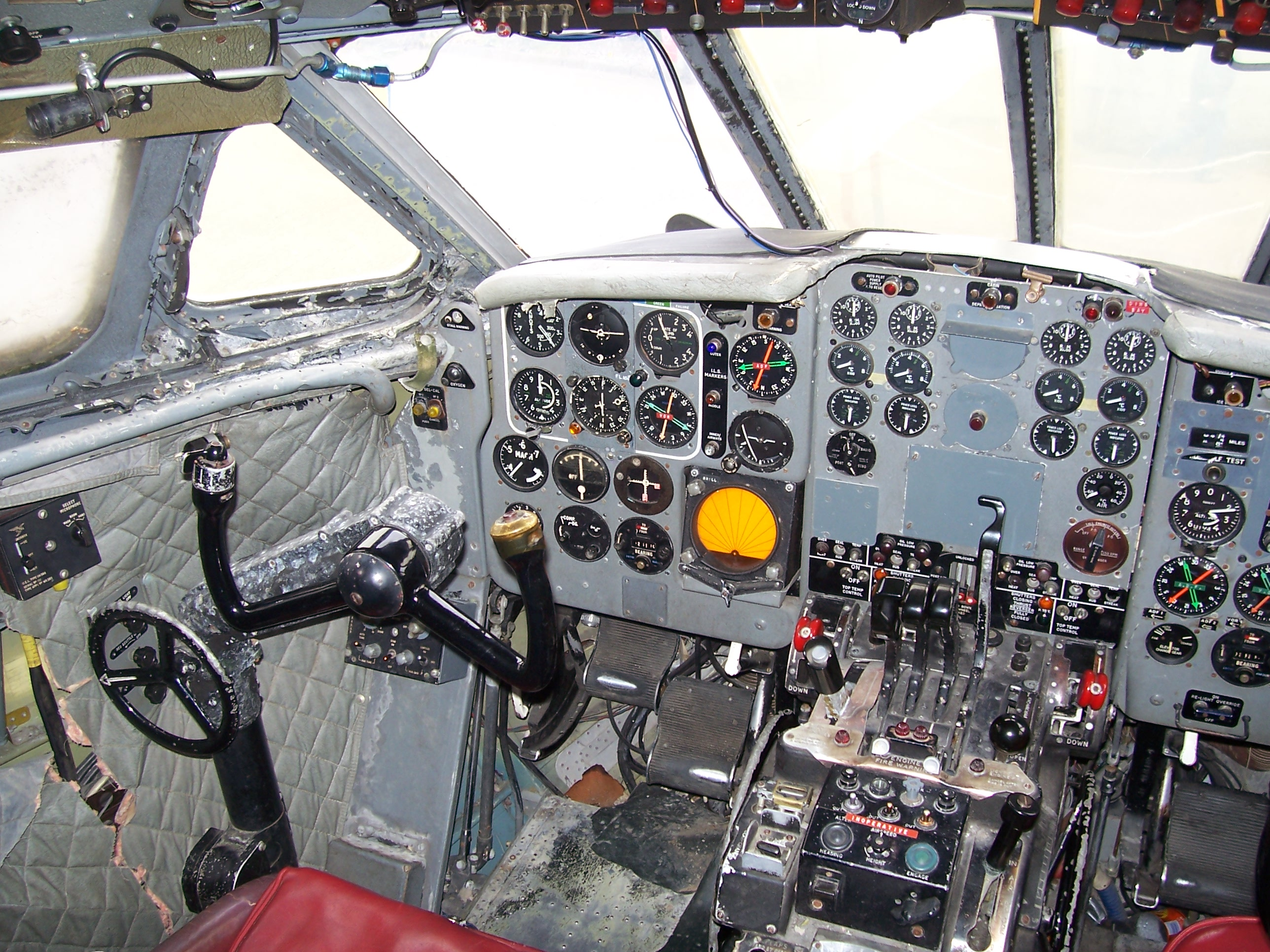
Comet 2 flight deck

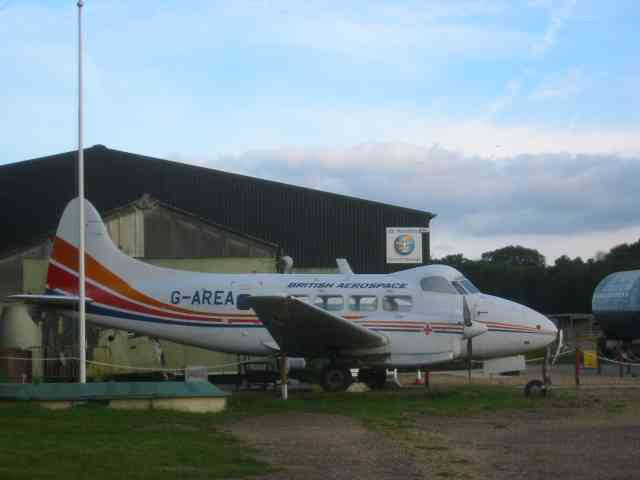
DH.104 Dove 8

- Airspeed Horsa I/II BAPC.232 – Composite fuselage
- British Aerospace 146-100 G-JEAO – Fuselage only
- Cierva C.24 G-ABLM – On permanent loan from the Science Museum
- de Havilland DH.53 Humming Bird J7326 – Fuselage only
- de Havilland DH.82 Tiger Moth G-ANRX
- de Havilland DH.82 Queen Bee LF789 – Fuselage only
- de Havilland DH.87 Hornet Moth G-ADOT
- de Havilland DH.88 Comet G-ACSR – Replica
- de Havilland DH.98 Mosquito Prototype W4050
- de Havilland DH.98 Mosquito FB.VI TA122/TW233
- de Havilland DH.98 Mosquito TT(B)35 TA634
- de Havilland DH.100 Vampire FB.6 J-1008
- de Havilland DH.103 Hornet VW957 – Tail section
- de Havilland DH.103 Hornet VX250 – Tail section
- de Havilland DH.104 Dove 8 G-AREA
- de Havilland DH.106 Comet 1A F-BGNX – Fuselage only
- de Havilland DH.106 Comet 1A G-ANAV – Nose section
- de Havilland DH.106 Comet C.2(R) XK695 – Cockpit section
- de Havilland DH.106 Comet 2 – Nose section
- de Havilland DH.110 Sea Vixen FAW.2 XJ565
- de Havilland DH.114 Heron G-AOTI
- de Havilland DH.115 Vampire T.11 XJ772
- de Havilland DH.125 Series 1 G-ARYC
- de Havilland Canada DHC-1 Chipmunk T.10 WP790
- Hawker Siddeley HS.121 Trident 2E G-AVFH – Fuselage only

=== Aircraft in storage ===
- de Havilland DH.98 Mosquito TT.35 TJ118 – Fuselage, with nose section removed.
- de Havilland DH.100 Vampire FB.5 VV217
- de Havilland DH.104 Dove 6 D-IFSB – On loan to ARG Fishburn
- de Havilland DH.112 Venom FB.4 WR539
- de Havilland DH.112 Venom FB.50 J-1632
- de Havilland DH.112 Venom FB.54 J-1790
- de Havilland DH.112 Venom NF.3 WX853
- de Havilland DH.113 Vampire NF.10 WM729 – fuselage pod only
- de Havilland DH.125 Jet Dragon G-ARYA – Cockpit section only

=== Aircraft under restoration ===
- de Havilland DH.89A Dragon Rapide G-AKDW
- de Havilland DH.112 Sea Venom FAW.22 XG730

=== Engines on display ===
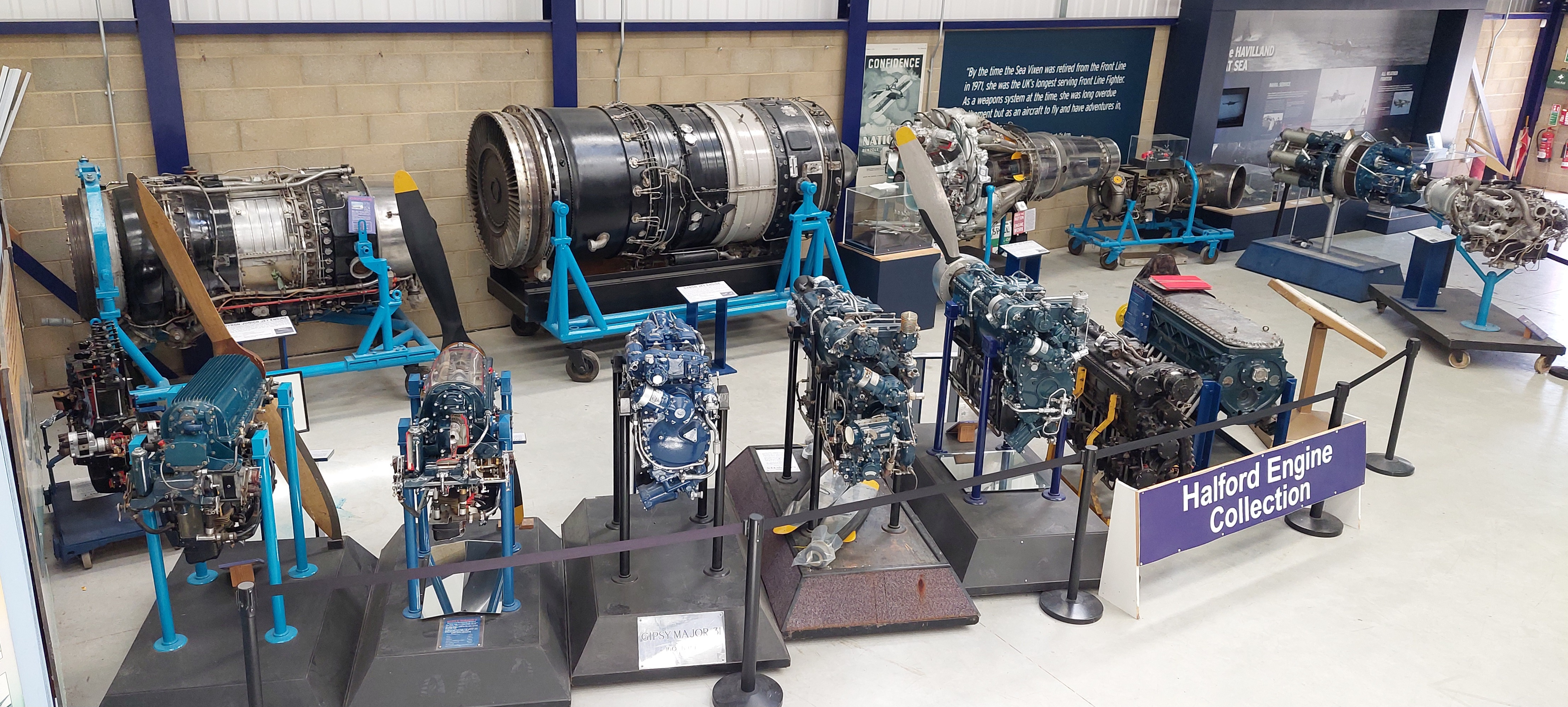
Overview of the Halford Engine Collection at the de Havilland Aircraft Museum

Piston engines

- de Havilland Iris (replica)
- de Havilland Gipsy
- de Havilland Gipsy Major
- de Havilland Gipsy Queen
- de Havilland Gipsy Twelve
- Rolls-Royce Merlin

Gas turbine engines

- de Havilland Ghost
- de Havilland Goblin
- de Havilland Gyron
- de Havilland Gyron Junior
- Rolls-Royce Gnome

Turboprop engines

- de Havilland H3

Rocket engines

- de Havilland Super Sprite
- de Havilland Spectre

== See also ==
- List of aerospace museums
