= General Electric T58 =

American turboshaft engine for helicopters

T58
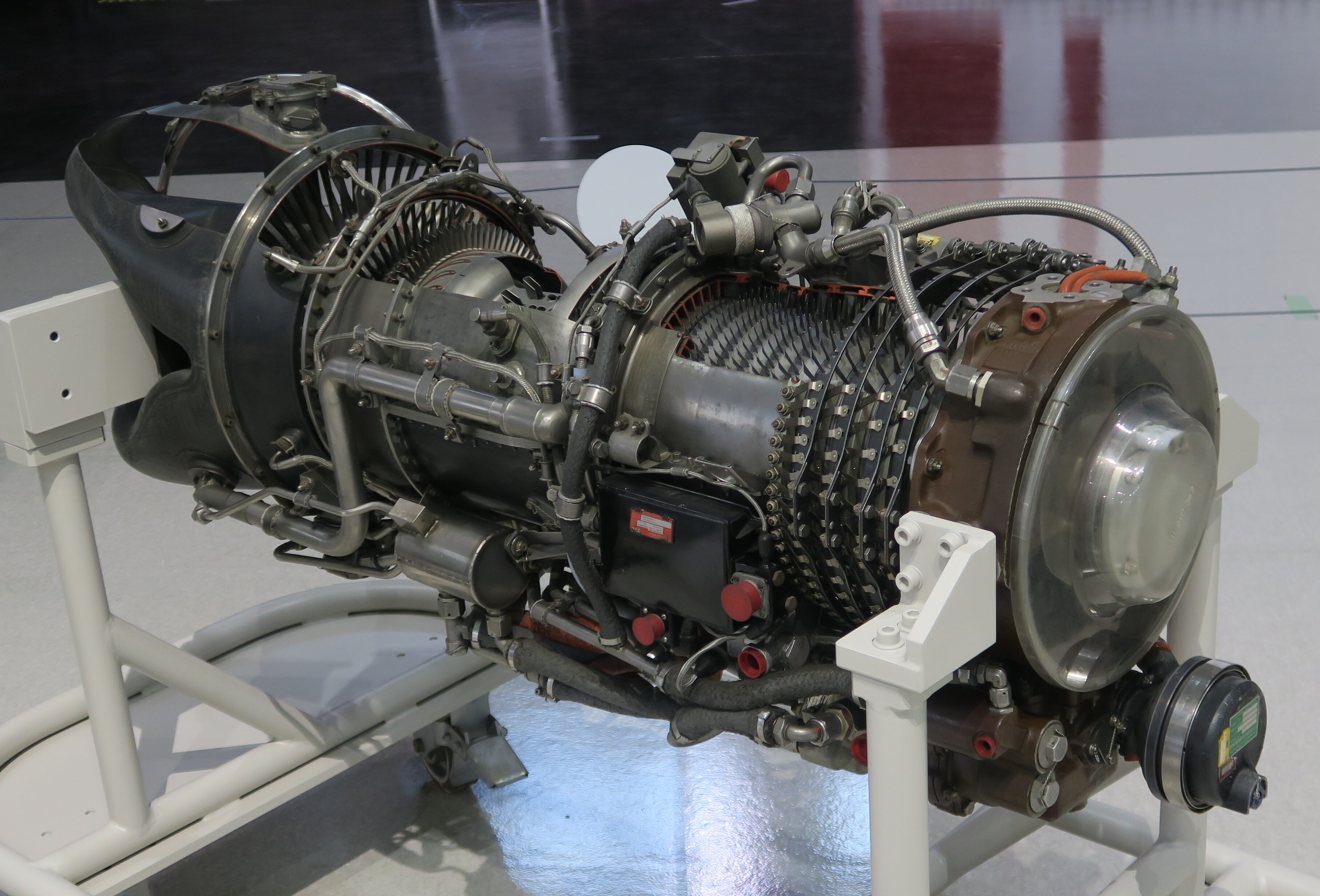
- Type: Turboshaft
- National origin: United States
- Manufacturer: GE Aviation
- First run: April 1955
- Major applications: Boeing Vertol CH-46 Sea Knight; Kaman SH-2 Seasprite; Sikorsky SH-3 Sea King
- Variants: Rolls-Royce Gnome

The General Electric T58 is an American turboshaft engine developed for helicopter use. First run in 1955, it remained in production until 1984, by which time some 6,300 units had been built. On July 1, 1959, it became the first turbine engine to gain FAA certification for civil helicopter use. The engine was license-built and further developed by de Havilland in the UK as the Gnome, in the West Germany by Klöckner-Humboldt-Deutz, and also manufactured by Alfa Romeo and the IHI Corporation.

== Design and development ==
Development commenced with a 1953 US Navy requirement for a helicopter turboshaft to weigh under 400 lb (180 kg) while delivering 800 hp (600 kW). The engine General Electric eventually built weighed only 250 lb (110 kg) and delivered 1,050 hp (780 kW) and was soon ordered into production. First flight was on a modified Sikorsky HSS-1 in 1957, and civil certification for the CT58-100 variant was obtained two years later.

A number of unusual features are incorporated into the T58:

- an all-axial compressor. Most other turboshafts in this power bracket have a centrifugal unit as a final compressor stage. As a result, the blades at the rear of the compressor are very small (less than 0.5in high) and extremely thin.
- compressor handling at part speed is facilitated by several rows of variable pitch stators at the front part of the unit. This was a fairly novel feature when the engine was first introduced.
- a single stage power turbine. which delivers power to the rear of the engine. The hot exhaust stream is diverted sideways, away from the output shaft.
- the combustor is a straight-through annular design, rather than reverse flow.

The main production version of the engine was the T58-GE-10, developing 1,400 hp (1,044 kW). The most powerful version, the T58-GE-16, produces 1,870 hp (1,390 kW).

== Variants ==
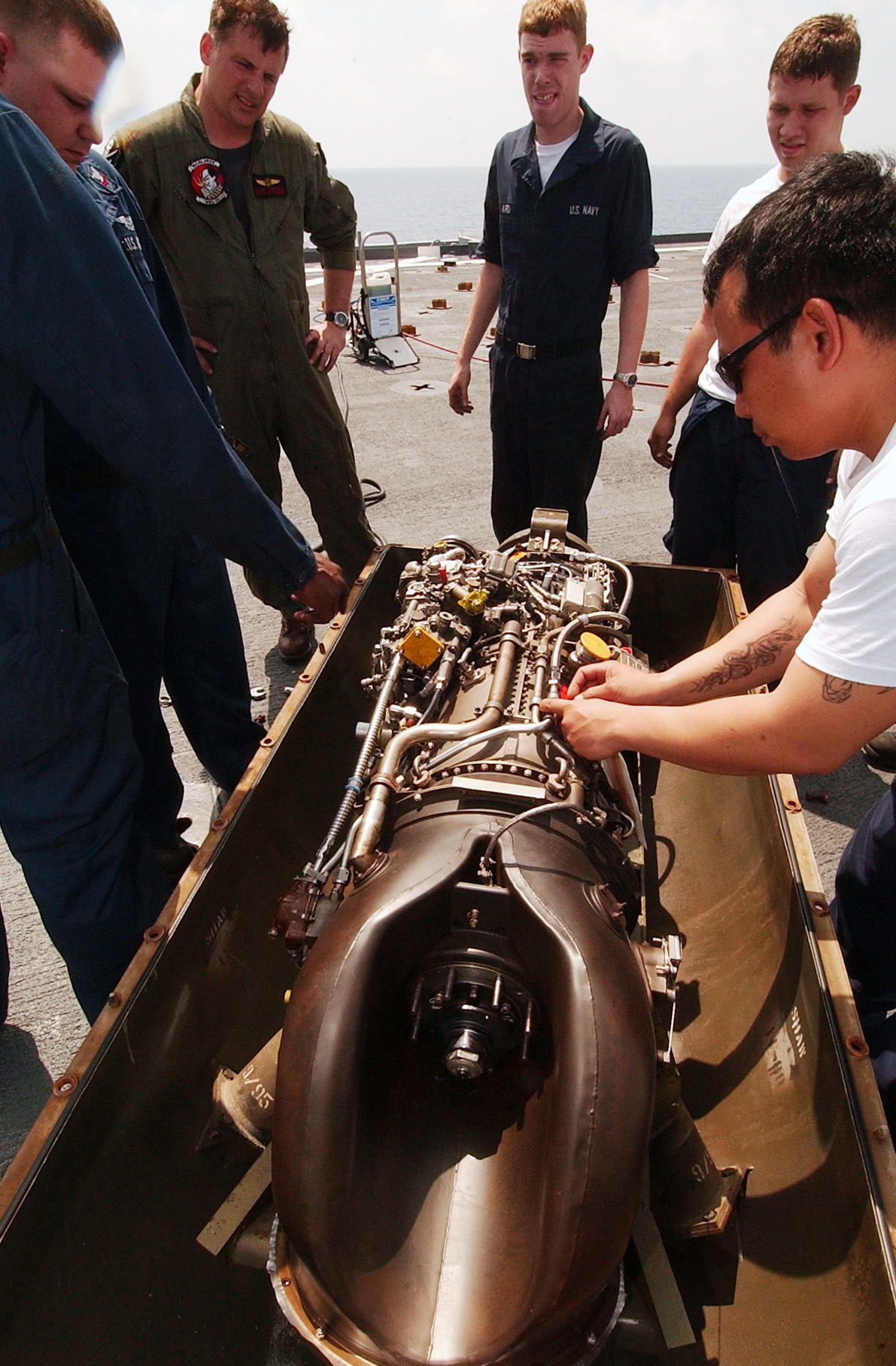
Inspection of a T58 engine before installation in a SH-3G Sea King helicopter

T58-GE-1
1,290 hp (960 kW)
T58-GE-2
1,325 hp (988 kW)
T58-GE-3
1,290 hp (960 kW)
T58-GE-4
T58-GE-5
1,500 hp (1,100 kW)
T58-GE-6
1,250 hp (930 kW)
T58-GE-8B
1,250 hp (930 kW)
T58-GE-8E
1,350 hp (1,010 kW)
T58-GE-8F
1,350 hp (1,010 kW)
T58-GE-10
1,400 hp (1,000 kW)
T58-GE-14
1,400 hp (1,000 kW) 2-stage power turbine
T58-GE-16
1,870 hp (1,390 kW)
T58-GE-100
1,500 hp (1,100 kW)
T58-GE-402
1,500 hp (1,100 kW)
CT58-100-1
1,050 hp (780 kW)
CT58-110-1
1,350 hp (1,010 kW)
CT58-140-1
1,500 hp (1,100 kW) commercial T58-GE-10
Ishikawajima-Harima CT58-IHI-110-1
1,400 hp (1,000 kW)
Ishikawajima-Harima CT58-IHI-140-1
1,400 hp (1,000 kW)
Ishikawajima-Harima T58-IHI-8B BLC
Variant used in the Shin Meiwa PS-1's boundary layer control system
Rolls-Royce Gnome
Licensed production and development of the T58 in the United Kingdom.

== Applications ==
- Aerospatiale SA 321K Super Frelon - Used by Israeli Air Force
- Agusta A.101
- AgustaBell AB204B
- Bell UH-1F/TH-1F
- Bell X-22 (YT58)
- Boeing CH-46 Sea Knight
- Fairchild VZ-5 (YT58)
- Kaman K-16B
- Kaman SH-2 Seasprite
- Piasecki XH-21D Shawnee (Model 71)
- Sikorsky SH-3 Sea King
- Sikorsky HH-3B/C/E/F
- Sikorsky HH-52 Seaguard
- Sikorsky HSS-1F (YT58)
- Sikorsky S-61L/N
- Sikorsky S-62
- Sikorsky S-67
- Sikorsky S-72
- Shin Meiwa US-1A for boundary layer control

=== Other ===
Two T58s, converted to turbojets by the removal of the power turbines, were used as the engines on the Maverick TwinJet 1200.

The Carroll Shelby turbine cars entered in the 1968 Indianapolis 500 race were powered by T58s. The cars were found to be using variable inlets to get around the USAC regulations on the maximum allowable inlet size and were disqualified.

== Engines on display ==
- There is a YT58-GE-2A cutaway on display at the New England Air Museum, Bradley International Airport, Windsor Locks, CT

== Specifications (T58-GE-8) ==
Data from

==== General characteristics ====
- Type: Free power turboshaft
- Length: 55 in (1,397 mm)
- Diameter: 16 in (406 mm)
- Dry weight:
  - 285 lb (129 kg) without reduction gearbox,
  - 391 lb (177 kg) with reduction gearbox

==== Components ====
- Compressor: 10-stage axial-flow compressor with variable inlet guide vanes, and variable incidence stators in first three stages
- Combustors: Annular combustion chamber with 16 burner nozzles on two manifolds
- Turbine:
  - 2× gas generator turbine stages and
  - 1× free power turbine stage
- Fuel type: Aviation kerosene

==== Performance ====
- Maximum power output: 1,250 hp (930 kW)
- Overall pressure ratio: 8.3:1
- Air mass flow: 12.4 lb/s (5.62 kg/s) at 26,300 rpm
- Specific fuel consumption: 0.64 lb/(hp⋅h) (0.39 kg/(kW⋅h)) at maximum continuous rating
- Power-to-weight ratio: 6.1 hp/lb (10.0 kW/kg) without reduction gearbox

== See also ==
Related development

- Rolls-Royce Gnome

Related lists

- List of aircraft engines
