= De Havilland Gyron =

1950s British turbojet aircraft engine

Gyron
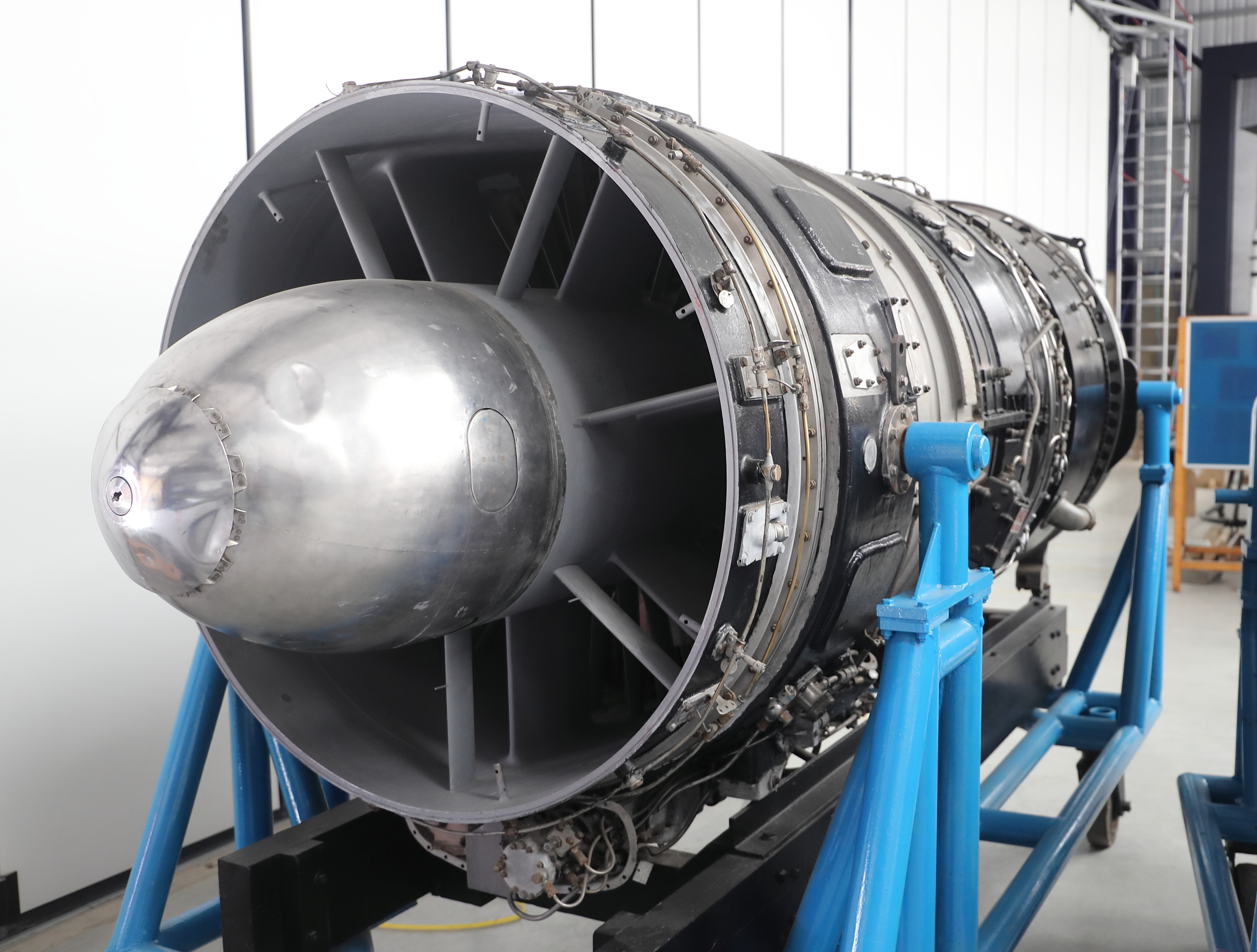
- de Havilland Gyron at the de Havilland Aircraft Museum
- Type: Turbojet
- Manufacturer: de Havilland Engine Company
- First run: 1953
- Major applications: Hawker P.1121 (not built)
- Developed into: de Havilland Gyron Junior

The de Havilland PS.23 or PS.52 Gyron, originally the Halford H-4, was Frank Halford's last turbojet design while working for de Havilland. Intended to outpower any design then under construction, the Gyron was the most powerful engine of its era, producing 20,000 lbf (89 kN) "dry", and 27,000 lbf (120 kN) with reheat.

The design proved too powerful for contemporary aircraft designs and saw no production use. It was later scaled down to 45% of its original size to produce the de Havilland Gyron Junior, which was more successful.

== Design and development ==
The Gyron was Halford's first axial-flow design, a complete departure from his earlier centrifugal-flow engines based on Whittle-like designs, the Goblin (H-1) and Ghost (H-2). The Gyron was also one of the first engines designed specifically for supersonic flight.

The Gyron first ran in 1953. Flight testing started in 1955 on a modified Short Sperrin, a bomber prototype designed as a fallback in case the advanced V-bombers programmes failed, that was instead reused as a research aircraft. The Sperrin used four Rolls-Royce Avons, mounted in over/under pairs in a single pod on each wing. For testing, the lower Avons were replaced with the much larger Gyrons. Flight rating was 18,000 lbf (80,000 N). In 1955 the DGy.1 received an official rating of 15,000 lbf (67,000 N). Addition of a reheat section boosted output to 20,000 lbf (89,000 N) and then 25,000 lbf (110,000 N) in the DGy.2

The Gyron was selected for a number of projects, most notably the Hawker P.1121 (sometimes referred to as the Hurricane) supersonic attack aircraft that was to have been the replacement for the Hawker Hunter. However, this project was eventually cancelled. Another design potentially based on the Gyron was the Operational Requirement F.155 interceptor, which optionally used the Rolls-Royce RB.106. F.155 was also cancelled, part of the 1957 Defence White Paper. Government financial support of the Gyron project itself was cancelled in March 1957, at a reported total cost of £3.4 million.

== Engines on display ==
An example of the Gyron is held by the Science Museum, London, another is on public display at the de Havilland Aircraft Museum, St Albans.

== Specifications (Gyron D.Gy.2) ==
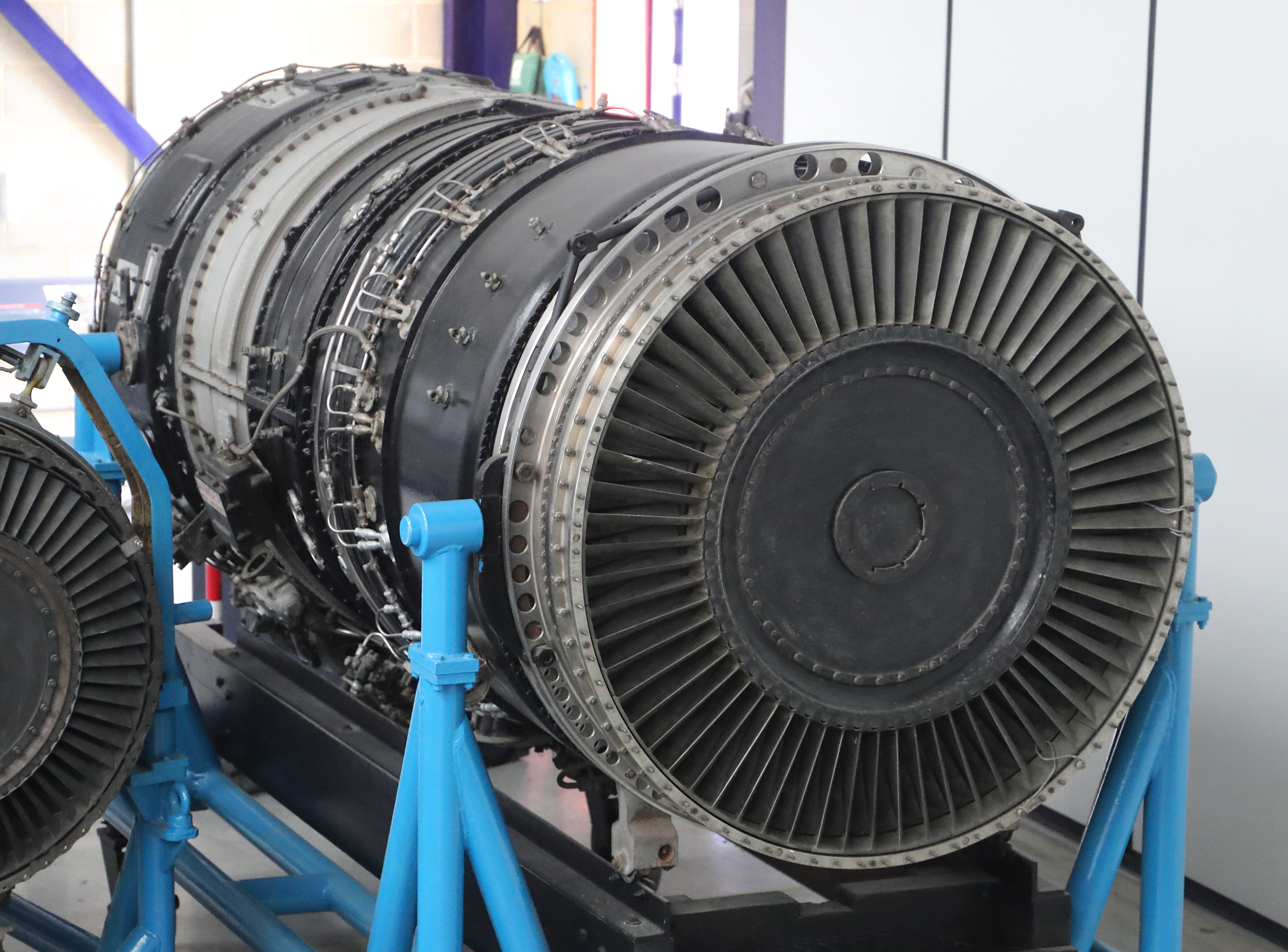
Rear view

Data from Aircraft engines of the World 1957.

==== General characteristics ====
- Type: Turbojet
- Length: 154 in (3.9 m)
- Diameter: 46.25 in (1.175 m)
- Dry weight: 3,500 lb (1,600 kg)

==== Components ====
- Compressor: Seven-stage axial flow
- Combustors: Annular combustion chamber with 16 duplex burners
- Turbine: Two-stage axial-flow
- Fuel type: JP-4
- Oil system: Pressure spray at 40–50 psi (280–340 kPa) with scavenge

==== Performance ====
- Maximum thrust: 20,000 lbf (89 kN) at 6,400 rpm static
- Overall pressure ratio: 6:1
- Air mass flow: 320 lb/s (150 kg/s)
- Specific fuel consumption: 1.00 lb/lbf/h (0.028 kg/N/ks) at maximum thrust subsonic
- Thrust-to-weight ratio: 5.88

== See also ==
Related development

- de Havilland Gyron Junior

Comparable engines

- Orenda Iroquois

Related lists

- List of aircraft engines
