= De Havilland Ghost =

1940s British turbojet aircraft engine

Ghost
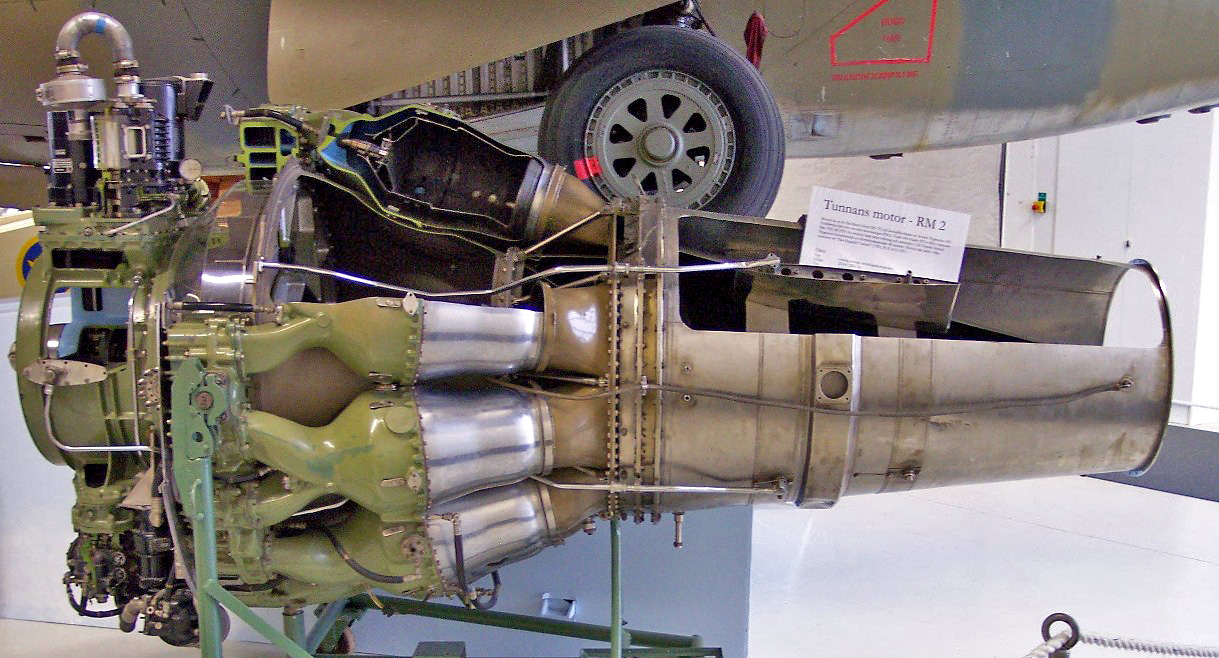
- A Swedish licensed-built de Havilland Ghost, the RM 2
- Type: Turbojet
- Manufacturer: de Havilland Engine Company
- First run: 2 September 1945
- Major applications: de Havilland Comet de Havilland Venom de Havilland Sea Venom
- Developed from: de Havilland Goblin

The de Havilland Ghost (originally Halford H-2) was the de Havilland Engine Company's second design of a turbojet engine to enter production and the world's first gas turbine engine to enter airline service (with BOAC). The Ghost powered the de Havilland Venom, de Havilland Comet and SAAB 29 Tunnan. It was a scaled-up development of the Goblin.

On 23 March 1948, John Cunningham achieved a new world altitude record of 59,446 ft (18,119 m). He was flying a Vampire Mk I modified by replacement of the Goblin engine with a Ghost engine, and installation of extended wing tips.

== Design and development ==
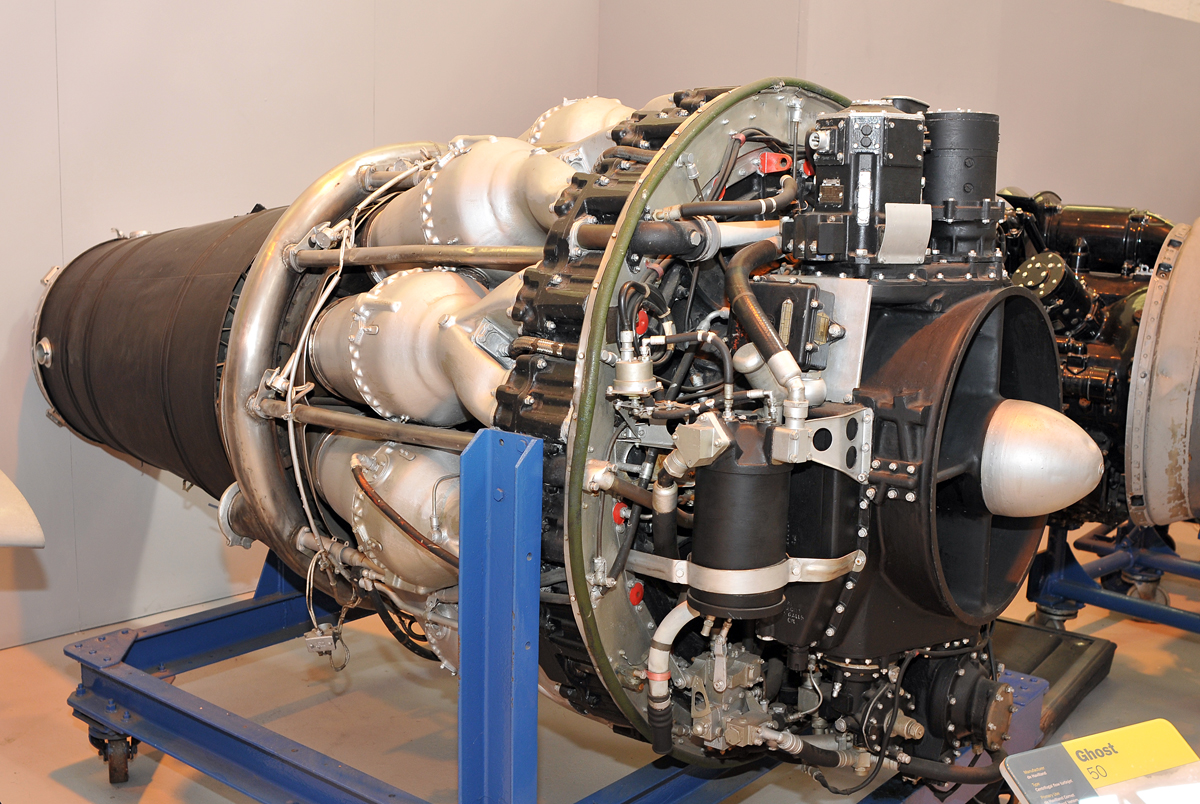
de Havilland Ghost 50 at RAF Museum Cosford

The Ghost originated when de Havilland started work on what was to become the Comet in 1943. Frank Halford's first design, the H-1, was just entering production and he was able to meet the power requirements of the Comet by scaling up the H-1. The resulting H-2 used ten larger combustion chambers in place of the Goblin's sixteen smaller ones, using bifurcated "split intakes" which were fed by each diffuser duct to effectively make twenty inlets. While the prototype was being built, de Havilland bought Halford's firm and reformed it as the de Havilland Engine Company, renaming the H-1 and H-2 as the Goblin and Ghost respectively.

The Ghost was running in 1944, and flew in 1945. This was long before the Comet or Venom was ready for flight. By this point the Ghost had been selected for the Swedish "JxR" fighter project, which eventually turned into the Saab 29 Tunnan. During the design of the Tunnan, Sweden received German data on swept wing designs via Switzerland and redesigned the plane to incorporate this planform. The Tunnan first flew in this form in 1948. For production versions of the Tunnan, the Ghost was built under licence by Svenska Flygmotor (later to become Volvo Aero) as the RM2. The Ghost was also licence built in Italy by Fiat and in Switzerland by Sulzer Brothers.

The Ghost would next be seen when the Comet I first took to the air on 27 July 1949. It was powered by the 5,000 lbf (22 kN) Ghost 50, which was the interim powerplant, pending the availability of the Rolls-Royce Avon engine which was to be used in the Comet 2. Several versions of the Ghost 50 were produced, ending with the Ghost 50-Mk.4 installed in the Comet 1XB which was built to test new fuselage construction techniques introduced to address problems with the Comet 1.

During development, the Royal Air Force also asked for an improved version of the de Havilland Vampire with greater load-carrying capacity and thus a larger engine. The resulting design was known as the Venom, and shared many features with the earlier Vampire. The Ghost first flew in the Venom on 2 September 1949. By this point the engine had been running for some time and was already at the Mk.103 model of 4,850 lbf (21.6 kN). The Venom was used primarily as a fighter bomber, although some were also produced as night fighters. The Venom was later selected by the Fleet Air Arm for their interceptor needs, and was widely used as the Sea Venom.

== Variants ==
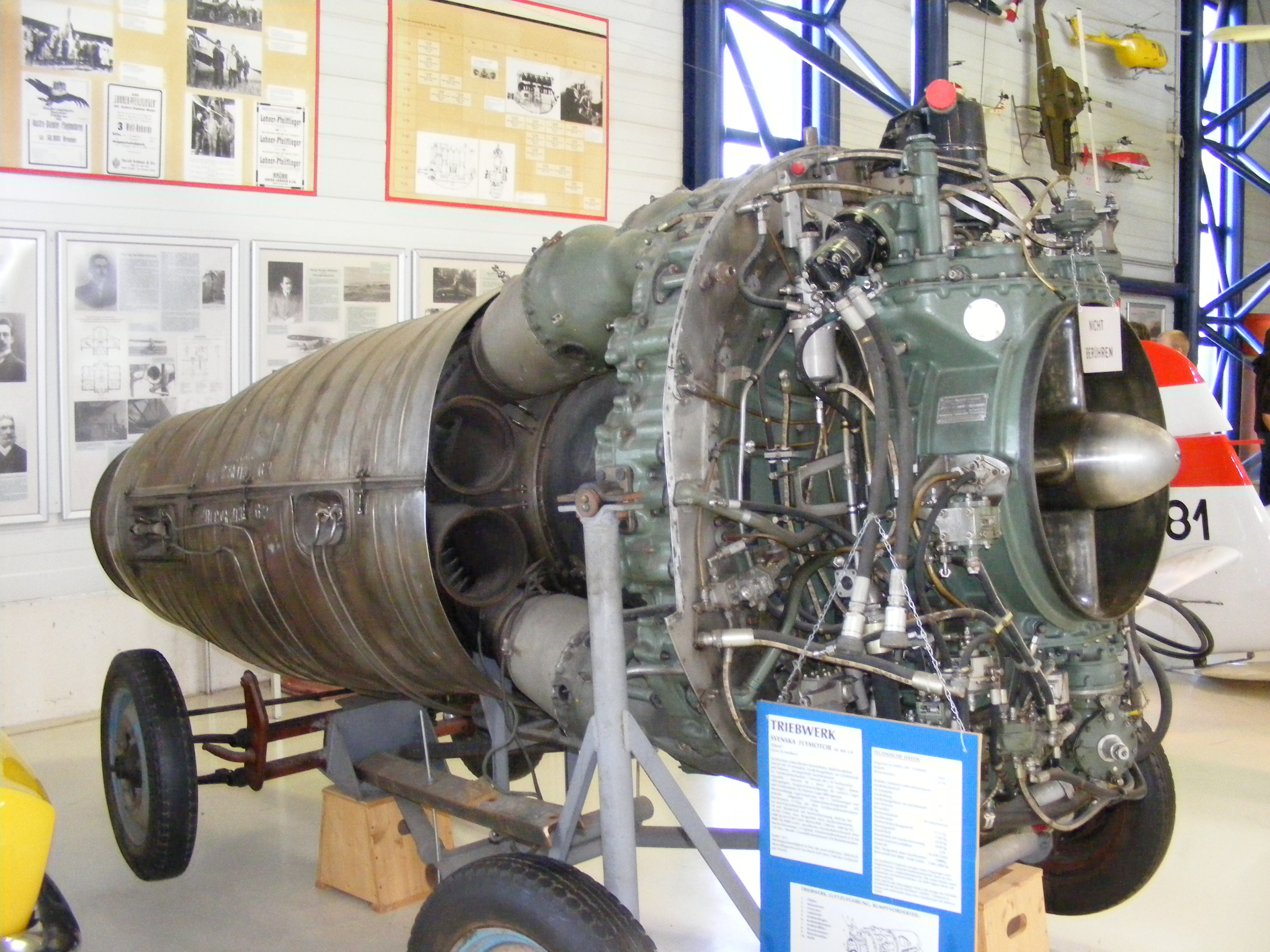
Volvo Aero RM 2B at Flugmuseum Aviaticum, Wiener Neustadt

Thrust given in pounds-force and kilonewtons (kN).

Ghost 3 (DGt.3)
Ghost 45
rated at 4,400 lbf (20 kN)
Ghost 48 Mk.1
(103) rated at 4,850 lbf (21.6 kN)
Ghost 48 Mk.2
(104)
Ghost 50 Mk 1
rated at 5,000 lbf (22 kN) at 10,000 rpm with a weight of 2,011 lb (912 kg)
Ghost 50 Mk 2
rated at 5,125 lbf (22.80 kN)
Ghost 53 Mk 1
(105)
Ghost 103
rated at 4,850 lbf (21.6 kN)
Ghost 104
rated at 4,950 lbf (22.0 kN)
Ghost 105
rated at 5,150 lbf (22.9 kN)
Svenska Flygmotor RM2
Licence production and development 5,000 lbf (22 kN) at 10,250 rpm
Svenska Flygmotor RM2B
RM2 with afterburner 6,200 lbf (27.58 kN) wet at 10,250 rpm; 4,750 lbf (21.1 kN) dry at 10,250 rpm.
Fiat 4001
(Ghost 48 Mk.1) Fiat licence production.

== Applications ==
- de Havilland Comet
- de Havilland Venom
- de Havilland Sea Venom
- "Ghost-Lancastrian"
- Saab Tunnan
- Crusader (speedboat)

== Specifications (Ghost 105) ==
Data from Aircraft engines of the World 1957.

==== General characteristics ====
- Type: Turbojet engine
- Length: 129 in (3,300 mm)
- Diameter: 52.7 in (1,340 mm)
- Frontal area: 15.2 sq ft (1.41 m^{2})
- Dry weight: 2,135 lb (968 kg)

==== Components ====
- Compressor: Single-stage centrifugal flow
- Combustors: 10 chambers
- Turbine: Single-stage axial flow
- Fuel type: Jet fuel

==== Performance ====
- Maximum thrust: 5,300 lbf (24 kN) at 10,350 rpm for take-off
- Overall pressure ratio: 4.6
- Turbine inlet temperature: JPT 1,400 °F; 760 °C (1,033.15 K)
- Specific fuel consumption: 1.02 lb/lbf/h (104 kg/kN/h)
- Thrust-to-weight ratio: 2.5

== See also ==
Related development

- de Havilland Goblin

Comparable engines

- Allison J33
- Rolls-Royce Nene

Related lists

- List of aircraft engines
