= De Havilland Gyron Junior =

1950s British turbojet aircraft engine

Gyron Junior
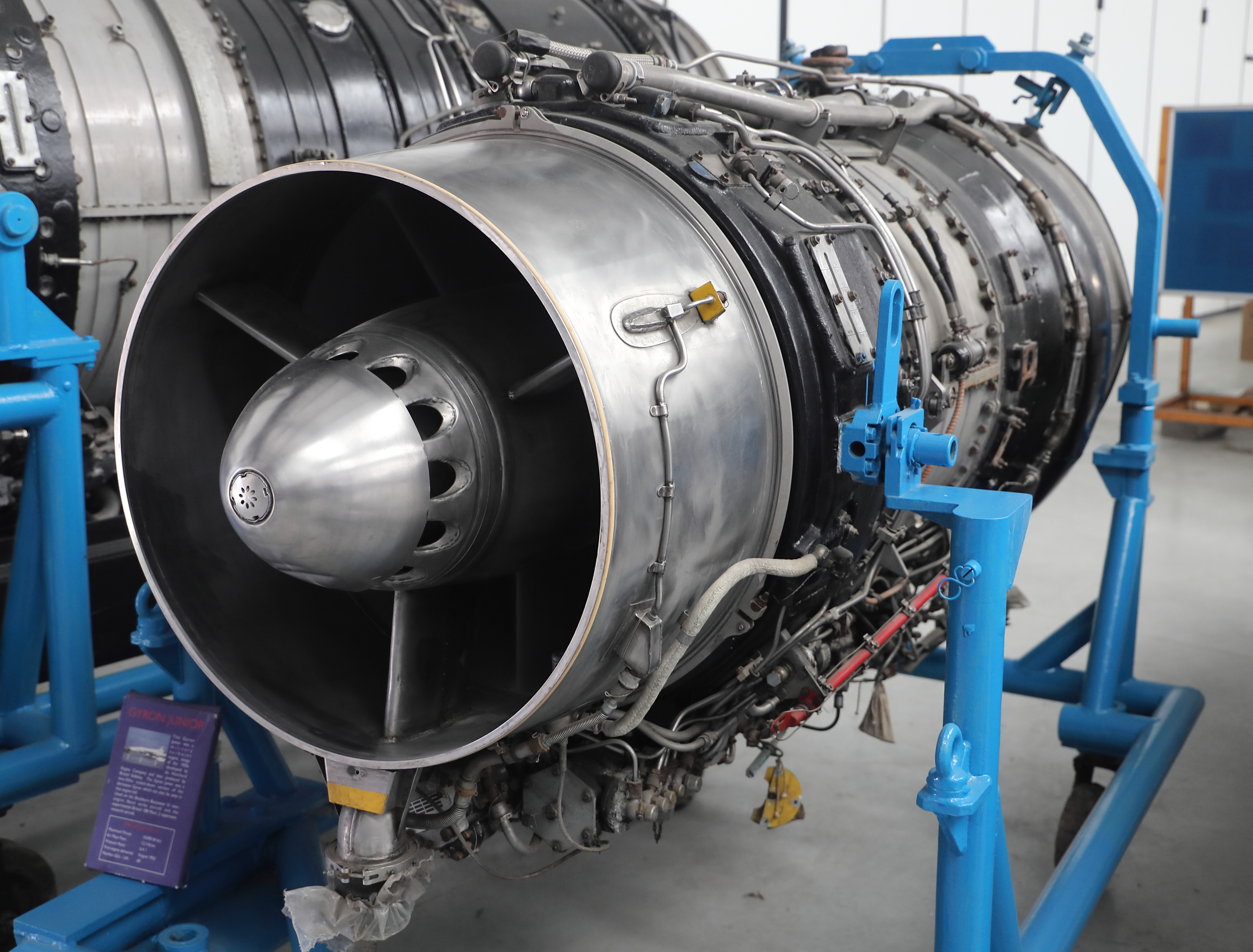
- de Havilland Gyron Junior at the de Havilland Aircraft Museum
- Type: Turbojet
- Manufacturer: de Havilland Engine Company
- First run: August 1955
- Major applications: Blackburn Buccaneer; Bristol 188
- Number built: 89
- Developed from: de Havilland Gyron

The de Havilland Gyron Junior is a military turbojet engine design of the 1950s developed by the de Havilland Engine Company and later produced by Bristol Siddeley. The Gyron Junior was a scaled-down derivative of the de Havilland Gyron.

== Design and development ==
The Gyron Junior was a two-fifths flow scale version of the existing Gyron engine. It started as Project Study number 43 in 1954 and the first prototype ran in August 1955.

It powered the Blackburn Buccaneer S.1 twin-engined Naval strike aircraft. The engine was rather unreliable and considered short of thrust. The later Buccaneer S.2 used the more powerful Rolls-Royce Spey engine.

The engine had variable inlet guide vanes, as used on many other engines, necessary for accelerating from idle to high thrust. However, on the Gyron Junior, positioning of the vanes was not reliable and could cause surging which, in turn, could prevent accelerating to higher thrust levels. A possibly unique feature on this engine was valve-controlled cooling air to the turbine blades. The engine had to supply air for the aircraft's boundary layer control system and the resulting thrust loss was unacceptable. To regain the thrust the turbine temperature limit was raised by using turbine blade cooling, selected only with blowing on.

In December 1970 a Buccaneer was lost after one engine surged and failed to accelerate on an overshoot and a week later another aircraft was lost after an uncontained engine failure. This last accident brought to an end the use of Gyron Junior.

Two Gyron Juniors, with afterburners, were also used on the Bristol 188 Mach 2 supersonic research aircraft. The 188 was originally intended to have the Rolls-Royce Avon but the half ton lighter Gyron Junior was substituted in June 1957. This engine was one of the first with continuously variable thrust up to full reheat; others increased thrust in discrete steps. The programme was terminated early without achieving the high-speed high-temperature trials that had been intended. Limitations included poor fuel consumption of the Gyron Junior and engine surging. Fuel limitations restricted the time spent at its maximum speed, Mach 1.95, to a few minutes. This was not long enough to achieve the required stabilized temperatures in "thermal soaking" tests.

== Variants ==
Ref:

Gyron Junior DGJ.1
(or P.S.43)
Gyron Junior DGJ.2
(Mk.101) Interim production stage, used on Buccaneer S. Mk.1. Variable inlet and guide vane, annular manifold for flap blowing, 121 in (3.1 m) long overall
Gyron Junior DGJ.10
Exhibited in 1958 at Farnborough, longer than the DJG.1
Gyron Junior DGJ.10R
(or P.S.50) highly augmented afterburning version for the Bristol 188, dry thrust 10,000 lb, wet thrust 14,000 lb (62.3 kN). Added zero stage and two rows of variable stators. Variable nozzle with convergent, convergent/parallel or convergent/divergent configuration depending on reheat selection and aircraft speed. Overall length 191 in (4.9 m)
Gyron Junior DGJ.20

== Applications ==
- Avro 732

Intended application, not built

- Blackburn Buccaneer S.1

40 aircraft built

- Bristol 188

Only 2 built

- Gloster Javelin

Testing only, 1 production FAW Mk.1 modified

- Saunders-Roe SR.177

Intended application, not built

== Engines on display ==
A de Havilland Gyron Junior is on display at the de Havilland Aircraft Museum, London Colney, Hertfordshire.

A D.H Gyron Junior is on public display at East Midlands Aeropark.

Also on display at the Gatwick Aviation Museum, Charlwood, Surrey, two running engines can also be found here, fitted to Buccaneer S.1, XN923.

== Specifications (Gyron Junior DGJ.10) ==
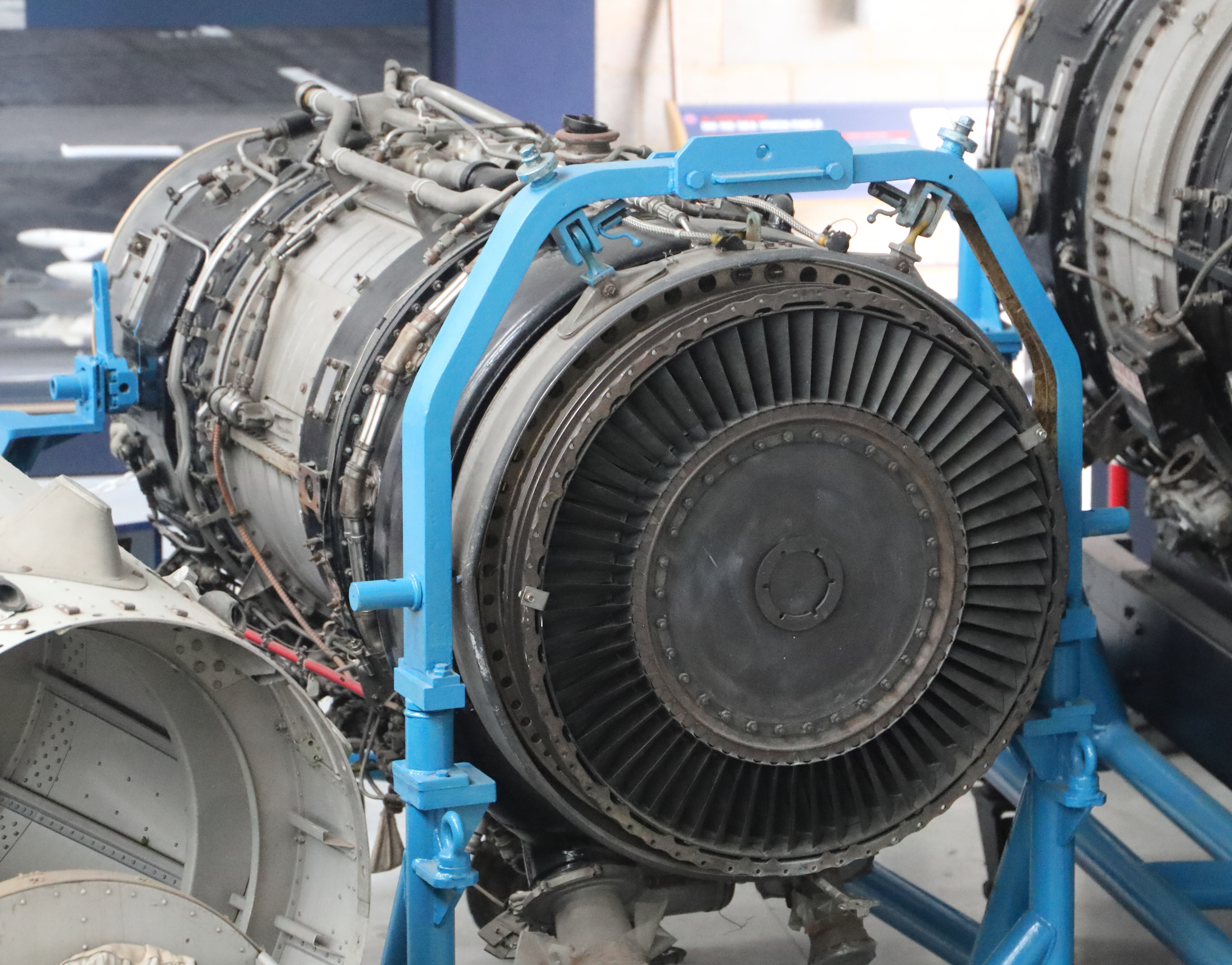
Rear view

Data from Gunston and Jane's All the World's Aircraft 1962-63.

==== General characteristics ====
- Type: Single-spool after-burning turbojet
- Length: 102.9 in (261.4 cm)
- Diameter: 41.1 in (104.4 cm)
- Dry weight: 3,100 lb (1,400 kg)

==== Components ====
- Compressor: 7-stage axial flow with Variable Inlet Guide Vanes (VIGV)
- Combustors: Annular combustion chamber with 13 spill-type burners
- Turbine: Two-stage axial flow
- Fuel type: Aviation kerosene
- Oil system: Pressure spray/splash with scavenging

==== Performance ====
- Maximum thrust: 10,000 lbf (44 kN) dry, 14,000 lbf (62 kN) wet at sea level, 20,000 lbf (89 kN)+ at M2.5+ at 36,000 ft (11,000 m)
- Overall pressure ratio: DGJ.1: 6.4:1
- Air mass flow: DGJ.1: 123 lb/s (56 kg/s)
- Thrust-to-weight ratio: 3.23 dry, 4.52 wet at sea level, 6.45+ at M2.5+ at 36,000 ft (11,000 m)

== See also ==
Related development

- de Havilland Gyron

Comparable engines

- Armstrong Siddeley Sapphire

Related lists

- List of aircraft engines
