= Richard Walker (engineer) =

Richard Walter Walker (27 December 1900 – 10 April 1982) FRAeS was a British aerospace engineer, and main designer for jet aircraft of Gloster Aircraft Company.

== Early life ==
He was born in 1900 in Bradford.

== Career ==
After an apprenticeship in Bradford he joined the RAF in 1918. In 1919 he went to Bradford Technical College for four years. After a brief period at Blackburn he joined the Hawker Aircraft company in 1925 as a draughtsman. During his time at Hawkers he was in charge of designing the metal wing for the Hawker Hurricane. Whilst at Hawkers he was seconded to a role in Sweden where he met his future wife.

He became an Associate Fellow of the Royal Aeronautical Society in 1934.

=== Gloster Aircraft ===
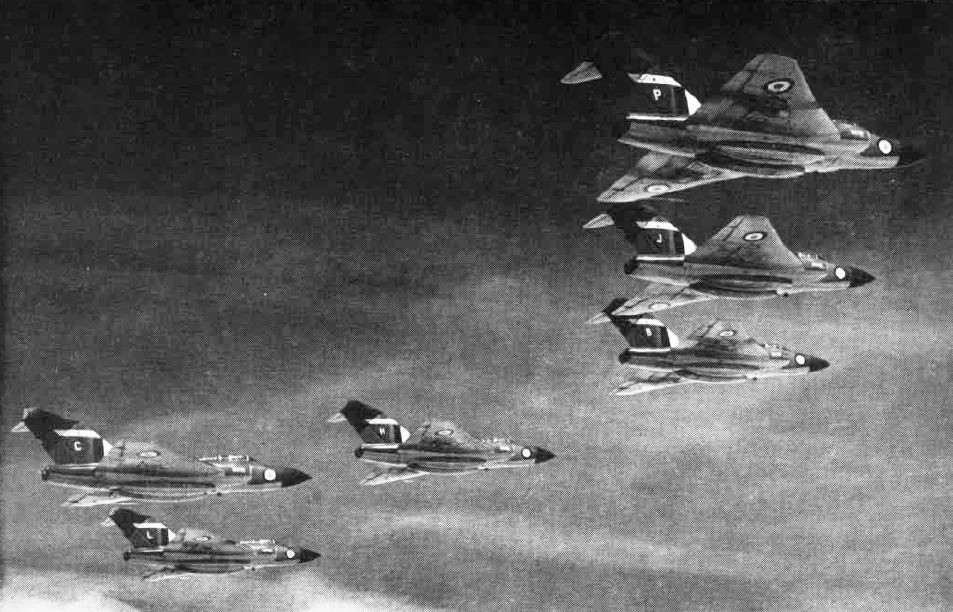
Gloster Javelins of 64 Sqn in 1959

He joined the Gloster Aircraft Company in January 1937 as assistant chief designer.

He was Assistant-Designer of Gloster Aircraft when it built its first jet aircraft the Gloster E28/39. He would visit the Power Jets company in Leicestershire with Ivor James and Jack Lobley. He was made an honorary member of the Institution of Engineering Draughtsmen and Designers in recognition of his work on the E28/39. He also worked with Herbert Steventon.

In July 1943 he took over full responsibility for the F9/40 project, of what became the Gloster Meteor.

In 1948 he became chief designer of Gloster Aircraft, succeeding W G Carter, who became Gloster's technical director.

In 1949 he was made a Fellow of the Royal Aeronautical Society.

In the early 1950s he designed the Gloster G.A.5 Javelin from F4/48, powered by the Armstrong Siddeley Sapphire This was first flown on 26 November 1951 by Squadron Leader Bill Waterton AFC from the former RAF Moreton Valence south of Gloucester, mostly in the west of Haresfield and now directly on the M5 motorway south of junction 12 (B4008). Gloster's general manager at the time was Percy Crabbe.

== Personal life ==
His daughter is Ingrid Twissell, born in 1943, who married in 1972. He had another daughter in 1935, and two sons.

He died in 1982 in Gloucester.

== See also ==
- Jet Age Museum, aviation heritage museum in Gloucestershire for Gloster Aircraft

Business positions
Preceded by George Carter	Chief Designer of Gloster Aircraft; 1948-1964	Succeeded by company absorbed into Hawker Siddeley
