= Peter Godfrey Lawrence =

British Royal Navy pilot (1920–1953)

- Born: 1920
- Died: 11 June 1953 (age 33)
- Military career
- Allegiance: United Kingdom
- Branch: Royal Navy
- Service years: 1939-1945
- Rank: Commander
- Awards: MBE
- Other work: Chief Test Pilot, Air race pilot

Cdr Peter Godfrey Lawrence MBE RD (1920 – 11 June 1953) was a Fleet Air Arm pilot during the second world war, and an air race pilot and test pilot in the post war period. In 1953 he was killed, test flying a prototype Gloster Javelin. Lawrence's total flying experience amounted to more than 3,000 hours on over 80 different types.

== Early life and Fleet Air Arm career ==
Peter Godfrey Lawrence was born in late 1920 in Leeds. He entered the aircraft industry as a Handley Page apprentice in 1937 and in 1939 joined the Fleet Air Arm in on a seven-year short-service commission. He flew Fairey Swordfish from 1940 to 1942, operating from HMS Eagle, HMS Illustrious and HMS Argus, and also from bases in the Western Desert.

In 1942 he was posted to the Naval Service Trials Unit, and from 1942 to 1944 he made 450 deck landings by day and night on 25 different aircraft carriers. In 1944 he was appointed to the Firebrand Tactical Trials Unit to develop the use of single-seat torpedo bombers, which had just been brought into service. He was awarded an MBE in recognition of this work in the 1946 new year honours.

== Test Pilot ==
In 1945 he was demobilised and joined Blackburn Aircraft as an experimental test pilot. After taking the (No. 4) Empire Test Pilots School course, he was appointed Blackburn's chief test pilot in 1948. He was promoted to Commander in the Royal Naval Reserve in January 1951.

Lawrence's passion for flying was not confined to work hours. From 1948 he was a participant in major UK air-races, flying aircraft such as Firebrands, a Blackburn B.2, and a Percival Proctor. He won the Kemsley Trophy and was third in the King's Cup in the summer of 1952.

In June 1952 he left Blackburns and joined English Electric Aviation as a test pilot on the Canberra programme. However six months later, at the beginning of 1953 he transferred to Glosters, with the aim of replacing Bill Waterton as chief test pilot.

On 11 June 1953, Lawrence was flying the second Javelin prototype (WD808), which had recently been fitted with a modified wing. He had been flying for half an hour when he radioed to his home base, Moreton Valence, that he was in trouble. At 20,000 ft (6,100 m) he had entered an unrecoverable flight condition (deep stall). Rather than abandon the prototype, he elected to crash-land with the intention of minimising damage to the aircraft and avoiding homes and people on the ground. He descended in a glide, but realised he was over playing-fields where teams of boys were playing cricket. He stayed with the aircraft all the way down to 250 ft (80 m), put it into straight slow run in, and ejected. Unfortunately, he was too low and he was killed on impact with the ground.
