= List of surviving Gloster Meteors =

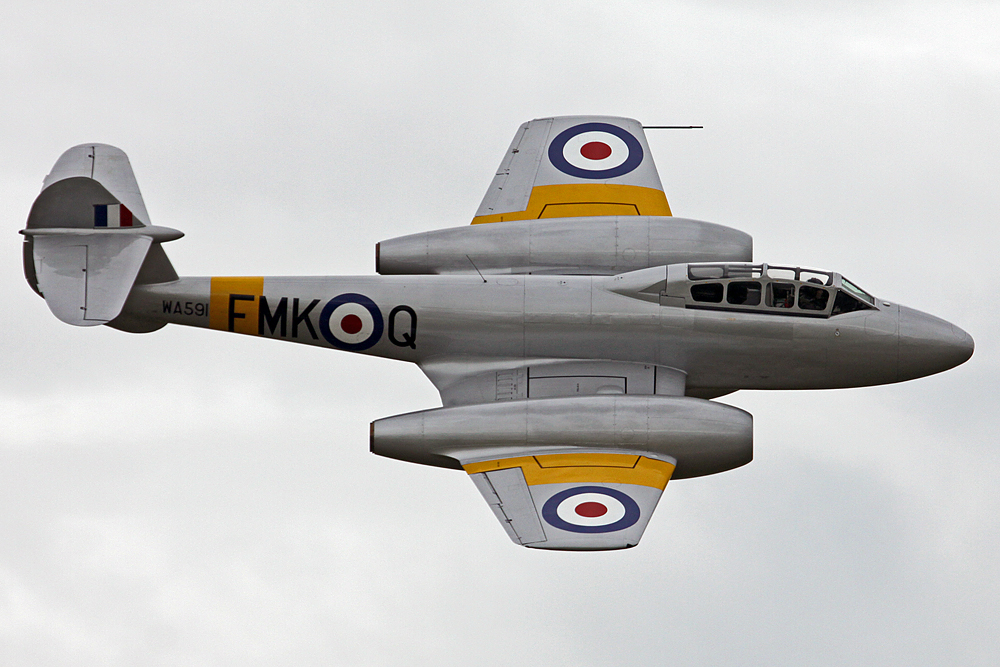
Gloster Meteor T.7 G-BWMF of the Classic Air Force displaying at RIAT, 2012

The Gloster Meteor is a twin-engined jet fighter, the first jet aircraft to serve with the RAF and the only Allied jet aircraft to reach combat in World War II. Almost 4,000 were produced, mostly in service with the RAF between 1944 and 1965. Meteors also served with the Royal Australian Air Force (RAAF), whose aircraft saw action in the Korean War; other users included the Argentinian, Brazilian, Belgian, Danish, Dutch, Ecuadorian, French and Israeli air forces. Many are preserved but only four are airworthy.

== Surviving aircraft ==
=== Argentina ===
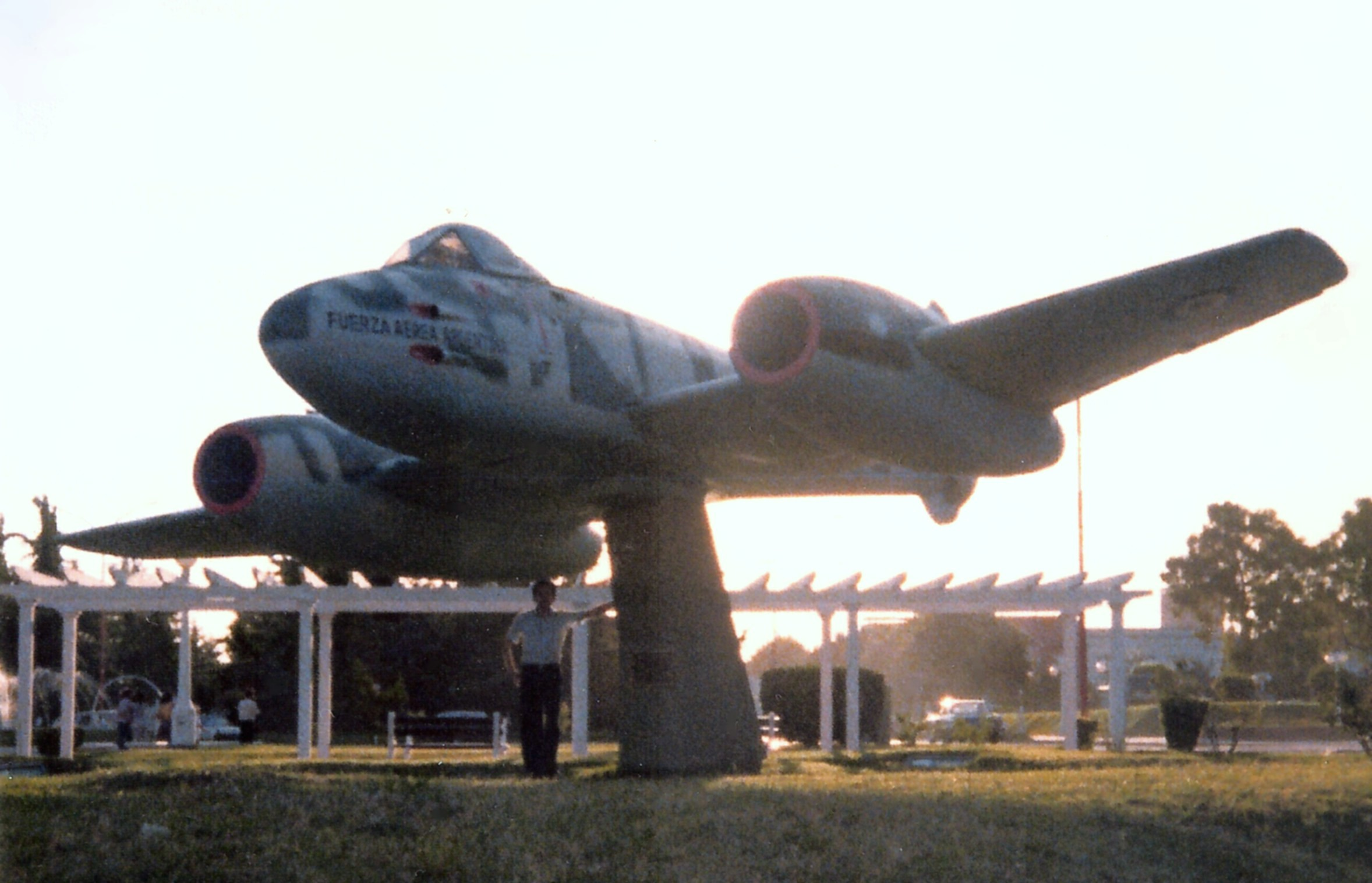
Gloster Meteor C-038 at Plaza Fuerzas Armadas in Junín, where it was in the 1980s.

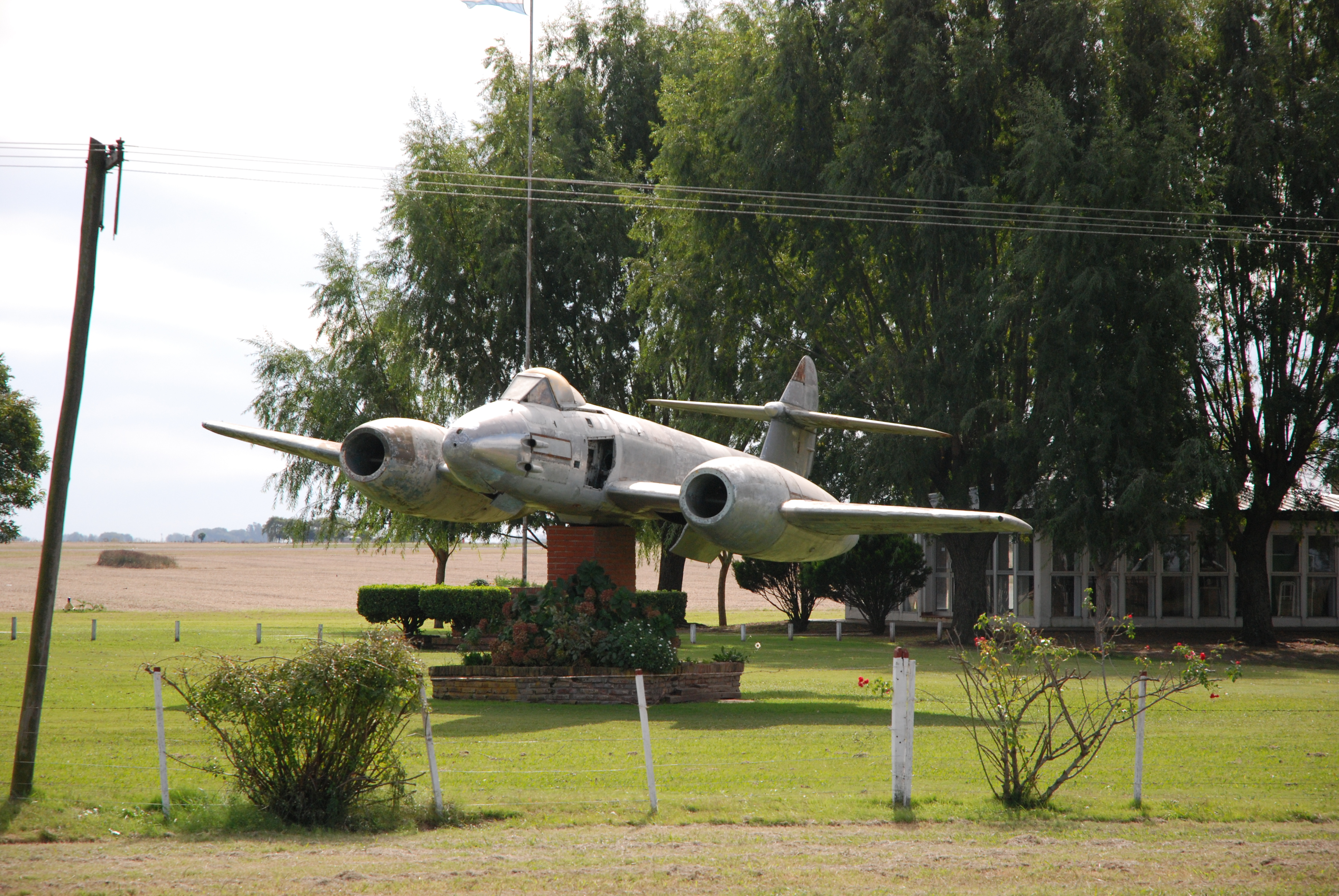
Gloster Meteor C-038 current location at Aero Club next to the airport in Junín, at kilometer 155 of Route 188.

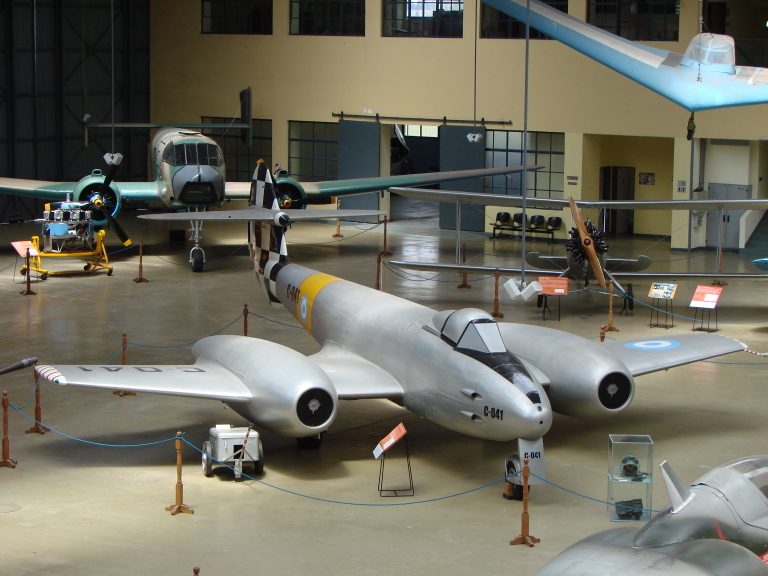
Meteor F.4 C-041 at the Museo Nacional de Aeronáutica, Buenos Aires in 2006

The first export order for Meteors came from Argentina, which received 100 F.4s. The first 50 were ex-RAF, the second 50 new. The Fuerza Aérea Argentina (FAA) identified aircraft with a number which remained the same throughout the life of the airframe, preceded by a letter indicating the role. From purchase in the late 1940s to about 1963 the Meteors were used as interceptors, letter I, and hence serialled e.g. I-025. After that, they were deployed as fighter bombers, letter C, and the same aircraft exampled before became C-025. A few, rebuilt aircraft did change number.

Stored or under restoration

- Meteor F.4 I-029, ex-EE537, being restored for the Museo Regional Interfuerzas, Santa Romana, San Luis.

On display

- Meteor F.4 I-002, ex RA386, displayed on plinth in Merlo, Buenos Aires. Painted as C-051.
- Meteor F.4 I-005, ex-RA390, displayed on plinth, Museum of Independence, Tandil, Buenos Aires.
- Meteor F.4 I-010, ex-RA393, School of Education (ENET no.4), Quilmes, Buenos Aires. Used as teaching aid.
- Meteor F.4 I-014, ex-EE575, displayed on plinth in Goya, Corrientes.
- Meteor F.4 I-019, ex-EE553, displayed on plinth at the Northern Roundabout of the Avenue Spinetto Santa Rosa, La Pampa. Painted as I-021, condition poor.
- Meteor F.4 I-025, ex-EE532, displayed on plinth on the Avenue of the Air Force, outside the Escuela de Aviación Militar, Córdoba.
- Meteor F.4 I-027, ex-EE527, Museo Regional Interfuerzas, Santa Romana, San Luis. It is the oldest Meteor airframe surviving anywhere, for the first 8 prototypes DG202-9/G, the first of which is preserved in the UK, did not bear the name.
- Meteor F.4 I-031, ex-EE588, Liceo Aeronáutico Militar de Funes, Funes, Santa Fe. Ogden locates this aircraft at the Aeroclub Las Parerjas, Las Parjas.
- Meteor F.4 I-038, ex-EE587, Junin Aeroclub, Junin, Buenos Aires.
- Meteor F.4 I-041, ex-EE586, Museo Nacional de Aeronáutica de Argentina, Morón, Buenos Aires.
- Meteor F.4 C-051, painted as C-002, Aeroclub Baradero, Baradero.
- Meteor F.4 I-057, displayed on plinth Loreto, Santiago del Estero. Ogden locates this aircraft at the Monumento de la VI Brigada Tandil, Buenos Aires. The earliest surviving Argentine built aircraft.
- Meteor F.4 I-071, painted as C-073, Collectión de la Escuela de Educación Téchnica 8 Jorge Newbery, San Justo, Buenos Aires.
- Meteor F.4 I-073, gate guardian (on tower to the left) at Mar del Plata Air Base. Painted as C-071.
- Meteor F.4 I-084, Resistencia, Chaco.
- Meteor F.4 I-088, Aeroclub Chivilcoy, Chivilcoy, Buenos Aires.
- Meteor F.4 I-090, displayed on plinth, Plaza Batalla de Salta, Salta City.
- Meteor F.4 I-093, gate guardian on plinth, VII Brigada Aerea, Jose C. Paz, Buenos Aires. Painted as C-099.
- Meteor F.4 I-094, Grupo de Vigilancia, Merlo, Buenos Aires.
- Meteor F.4 I-095, gate guardian on plinth, Edificio Condor, Buenos Aires.
- Meteor F.4 I-099, on plinth at Presidente Perón International Airport, Neuquen.

=== Australia ===
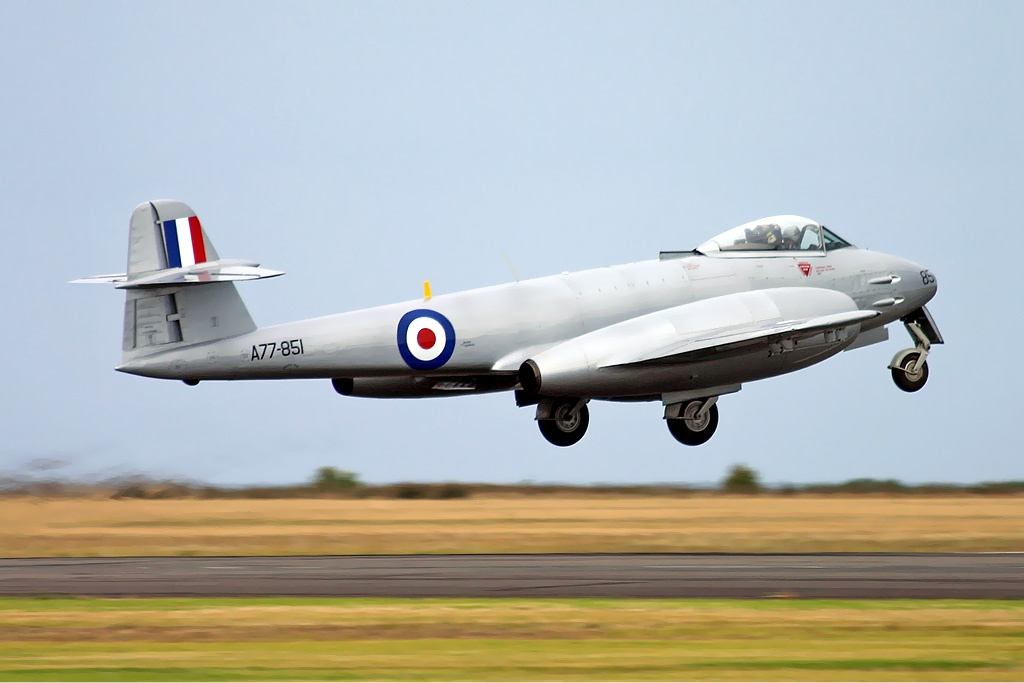
Meteor F.8 VH-MBX at Point Cook in 2006.

Airworthy

- Meteor F.8 VH-MBX, ex-RAF VZ467, exported to the Temora Aviation Museum in 2001. Painted as A77-851, flown in Korea by Sgt. George Hale of 77 Squadron. Ownership was transferred to the Royal Australian Air Force in July 2019 and it is operated by the Air Force Heritage Squadron (Temora Historic Flight).

On display

- Meteor F.3 A77-1, ex-EE427, Australian National Heritage Centre Winnellie, Northern Territory.
- Meteor T.7 A77-701, originally A77-229, ex-WA731, Lions Cub Park Missile Museum, Woomera, South Australia.
- Meteor T.7 A77-702, originally A77-30, ex-WA732, RAAF Museum, Point Cook VIC.
- Meteor T.7 A77-705, ex-WA680, RAAF Museum, Point Cook VIC.
- Meteor T.7 A77-707, ex-WA118, Australian National Aviation Museum, Moorabbin Airport VIC.
- Meteor F.8 WE925, Bankstown, NSW. ex East Midlands Aeropark, Wales Aircraft Museum.
- Meteor F.8 A77-368, ex-WA952, Anzac Hall, Australian War Memorial, Canberra.
- Meteor F.8 A77-851 ex-WK653, South Australian Aviation Museum, Port Adelaide. Central and forward fuselage only.
- Meteor F.8 A77-867, ex-WK685, Classic Jets Fighter Museum, Parafield Airport nr. Adelaide
- Meteor F.8 A77-868, ex-WK674, Camden Museum of Aviation, NSW, Australia
- Meteor F.8 A77-870, ex-WK748, RAAF Museum, Point Cook, VIC.
- Meteor F.8 A77-871, ex-WK791, RAAF Forrest Hill, Wagga Wagga, NSW.
- Meteor F.8 A77-874, ex-WK909, RAAF Forrest Hill, Wagga Wagga, NSW.
- Meteor F.8 A77-875, ex-WK798, painted as A77-385, Fighter World, RAAF Base Williamtown NSW.
- Meter TT.8 WA880, painted as A77-721 (no Australian history).
- Meteor TT.20 WD647, Queensland Air Museum, Caloundra, Queensland.

=== Belgium ===
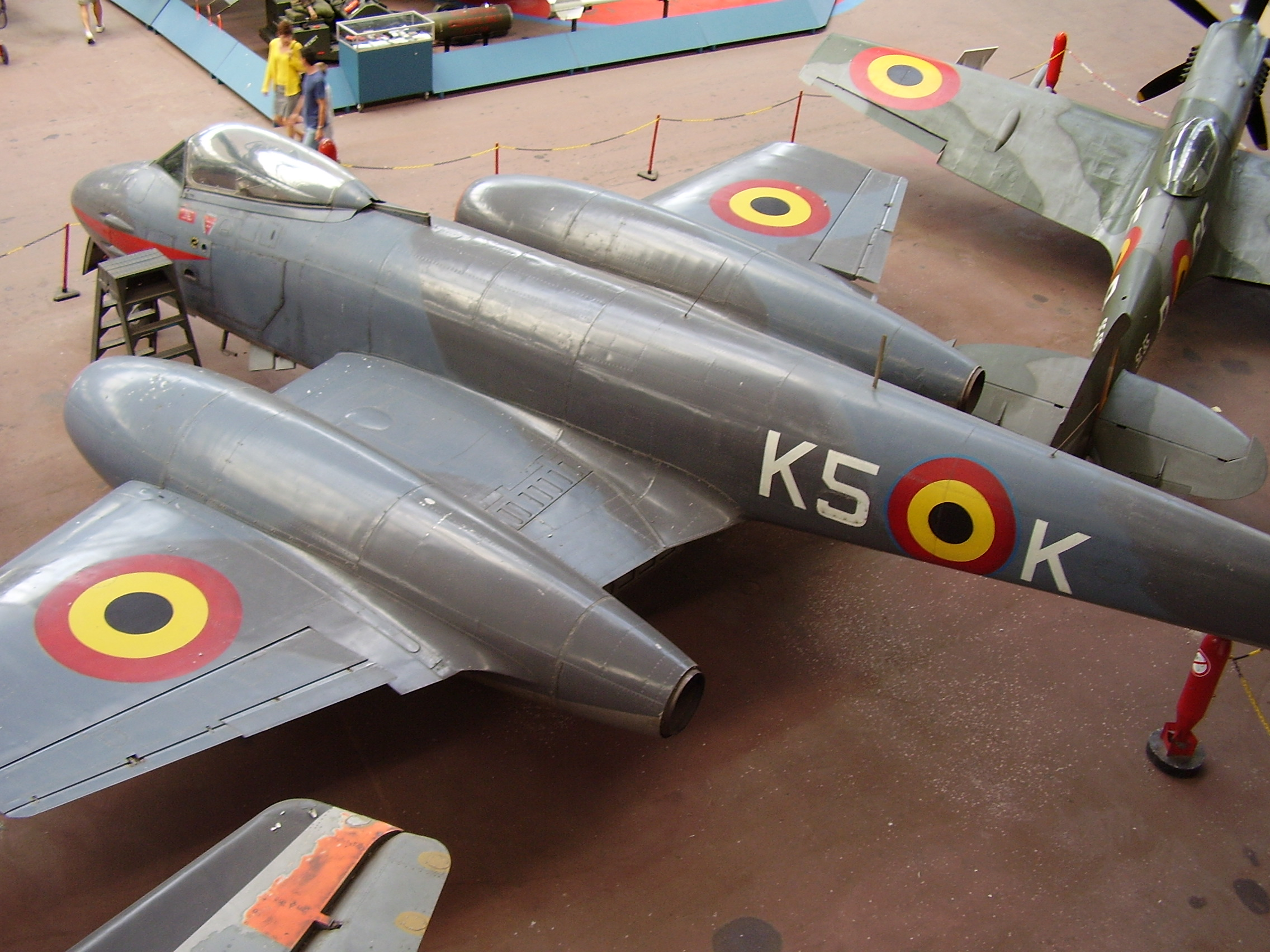
Meteor F.8 EG-224 at the Royal Military Museum Brussels in 2007.

The Belgian Air Force had 48 Meteor F.4s, 42 T.7s and, later 240 F.8s.

On display

- Meteor F.8 EG-18, Musée International de la Base Aérienne de Chièvres, Chièvres.
- Meteor F.8 EG-79, painted as EG-*), 1st wing Historical Center, Beauvechain, Belgium. Built under licence in the Netherlands by Fokker.
- Meteor F.8 EG-162, Musée dela Citadelle, Dinant. Built under licence in the Netherlands by Fokker and assembled in Belgium by Avions Fairey.
- Meteor F.8 EG-224, Musée Royal de l'Armée, Brussels. Built in Belgium by Avions Fairey with parts provided by Glosters.
- Meteor NF.11 NF-11-3, French Armée de l'Air, ex-WM298, Musée Royal de l'Armée, Brussels.

=== Brazil ===
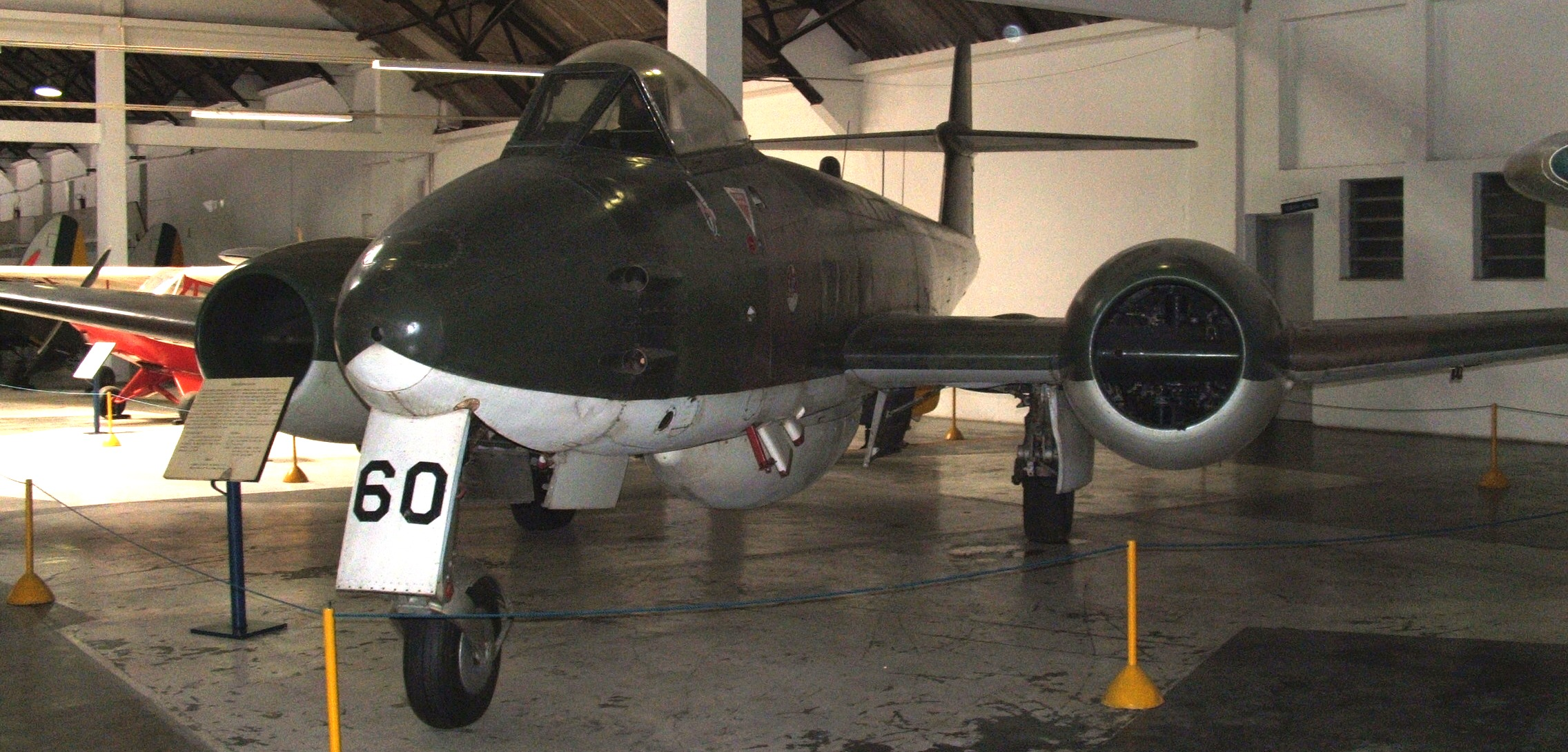
Meteor T.7 4309 ex-WS151 at the Museu Aeroespacial (MUSAL), Campo dos Afonsos, Rio de Janeiro in 2005.

The Brazilian Air Force received 10 Meteor T.7s and 60 F.8s.

On display

- Meteor T.7 4300 ex-WS142, Museu Aeroespacial (MUSAL), Campo dos Afonsos, Rio de Janeiro.
- Meteor T.7 4308 ex-WS150, Manaus Air Museum.
- Meteor T.7 4309 ex-WS151, Museu Aeroespacial (MUSAL), Campo dos Afonsos, Rio de Janeiro.
- Meteor F.8 4004, gate guardian at the Salvador International Airport, Salvador.
- Meteor T.8 4399 painted as 4460, Museu Aeroespacial (MUSAL), Campo dos Afonsos, Rio de Janeiro.
- Meteor F.8 4401, left off the approach to AMAN, Resende, Rio de Janeiro. The second of the F.8s.
- Meteor F.8 4406, Escola Preparatória de Cadetes do Ar (EPCAR) Collection, Barbacena.
- Meteor F.8 4409, Museu Eduardo André Matarazzo, Bebedouro, São Paulo.
- Meteor F.8 4411, Monumento de Goiânia.
- Meteor F.8 4413, Academia da Forca Aérea (AFA), Pirassununga, São Paulo.
- Meteor F.8 4430, on a plinth at Santa Cruz Air Force Base (BASC), Rio de Janeiro.
- Meteor F.8 4433, Canoas Air Base (BACO), R. Augusto Severo, Canoas.
- Meteor T.8 4438, Museu Aeroespacial (MUSAL), Campo dos Afonsos, Rio de Janeiro.
- Meteor F.8 4439, on a pylon in the Praça do Avião, Canoas, Rio Grande do Sul.
- Meteor F.8 4440, Museu Asas de um Sonho, São Carlos.
- Meteor F.8 4441, Santa Cruz Air Force Base (BASC), Rio de Janeiro.
- Meteor F.8 4442, Museu Eduardo André Matarazzo, Bebedouro, São Paulo.
- Meteor F.8 4448, gate guardian to Canoas Air Base (BACO), R. Augusto Severo, Canoas.
- Meteor F.8 4452, CINDACTA II, Curitiba, Paraná. Displayed on the entry road to the complex.
- Meteor T.8 4453, Museu Aeroespacial (MUSAL), Campo dos Afonsos, Rio de Janeiro.
- Meteor F.8 4460, ex-4399, Museu Aeroespacial (MUSAL), Campo dos Afonsos, Rio de Janeiro.

=== Czech Republic ===
On display

- Meteor F.8 EG-247, Prague Aviation Museum, Kbely. Ex-Belgian Air Force, built in Belgium by Avions Fairey with parts provided by Glosters.

=== Denmark ===
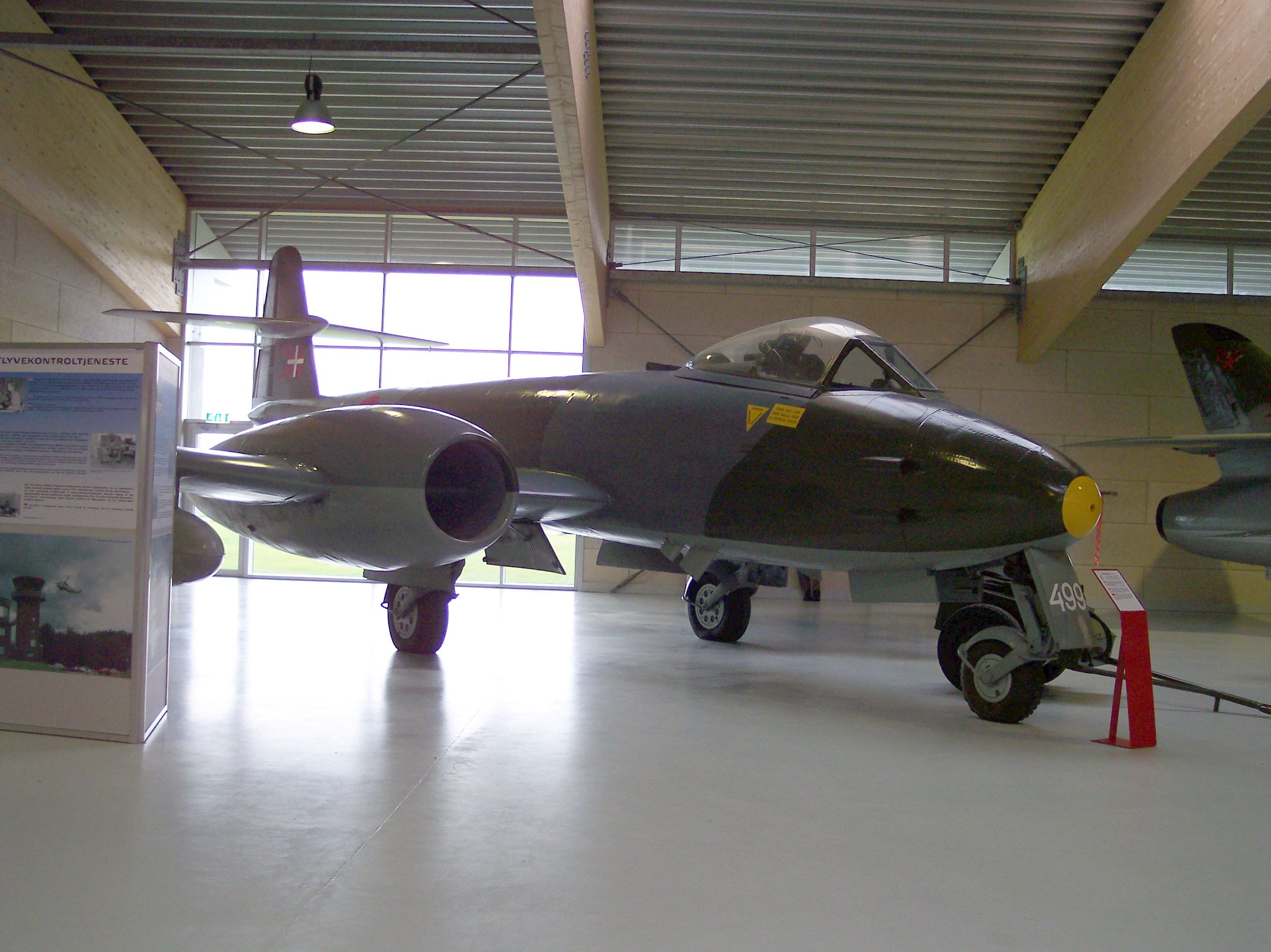
Danish F.8 43-499 at the Danmarks Flymuseum in 2006

The Royal Danish Air Force purchased 20 each of Meteors marks F.4, F.8 and NF.11, plus 9 T.7s.

Stored

- Meteor F.4 43-469, Flyvestation Aalborg, Vadum
- Meteor T.7 22-265, Flyvestation Aalborg, Vadum
- Meteor F.8 44-491, Royal Danish Air Force Museum, Air Base Karup, Midtjyllands Airport

On display

- Meteor F.4 43-461, Danmarks Tekniske Museum, Helsingor
- Meteor F.8 43-499, Danmarks Flymuseum, Stauning Vestjylland Airport
- Meteor TT.20 51-504, The Defence and Garrison Museum, Aalborg.

=== Ecuador ===
The government ordered 12 ex-RAF FR.9s in 1954.

- Meteor F.R.9, Base Aérea Taura.
- Meteor F.R.9 091, ex-WH540, Guayaquil Air Base.
- Meteor F.R.9 FF-112, ex-WH547, Base Aérea Cotopaxi.
- Meteor F.R.9 FF-114, ex-WB136, Base Aérea Cotopaxi.
- Meteor F.R.9 FF-118, ex-WH549, Base Aérea Taura.
- Meteor F.R.9 FF-123, ex-VW366, Air Force Museum, Quito.

=== France ===
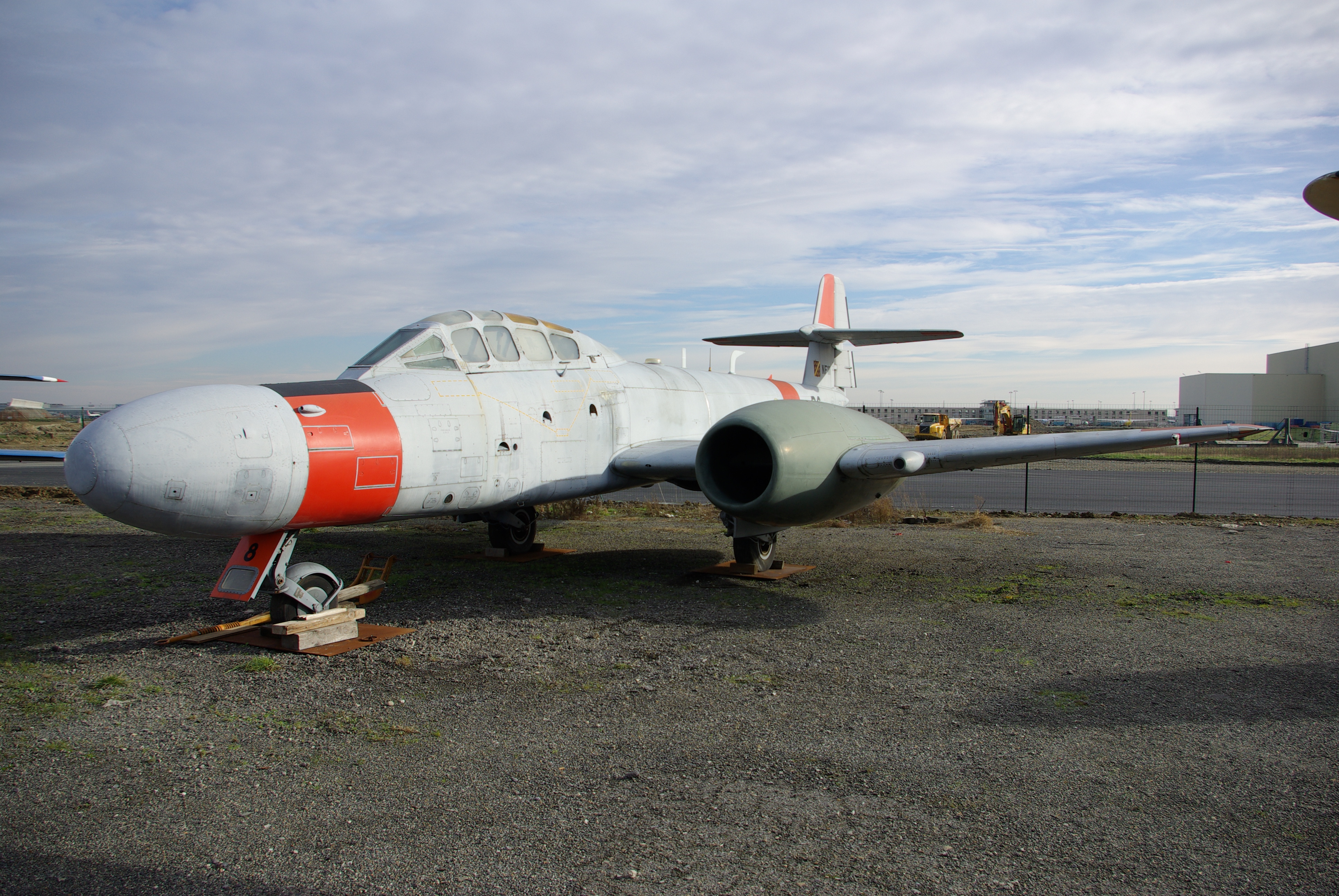
French Meteor NF. 11 at Ailes Anciennes Toulouse in 2008.

L'Armée de l'Air had 32 ex-RAF meteor NF.11s delivered in the early 1950s.

On display

- Meteor T.7 F6, ex-WA607, Chateau Savigny-les-Beaune.
- Meteor NF.11 NF-11-1, ex-WM296, Musée Européen de la Chasse, Montelimar.
- Meteor NF.11 NF-11-5, ex-WM300, Musée de l'Air et de l'Espace, Paris le Bourget. Reserve collection.
- Meteor NF.11 NF-11-8, ex-WM303, Ailes Anciennes Toulouse. Toulouse.
- Meteor NF.11 NF-11-9, ex-WM304, Musée de l'Air et de l'Espace, Paris le Bourget. Reserve collection.
- Meteor NF.11 NF-11-15 Musée de l'Air et de l'Espace, Paris le Bourget. Reserve collection. Interesting nose.
- Meteor NF.11 NF-11-24, ex-WM382, Chateau Savigny-les-Beaune.
- Meteor NF.11 NF-11-747, ex-WS747, Musée de l'Air et de l'Espace, Paris le Bourget. Reserve collection.
- Meteor NF.11 SE-DCF, ex-WM-395, Chateau Savigny-les-Beaune.

=== Germany ===
On display

- Meteor NF.11 NF-11-14, ex-WM348, French Armée de l'Air, Luftwaffenmuseum der Bundeswehr, Gatow, Berlin.

=== Israel ===
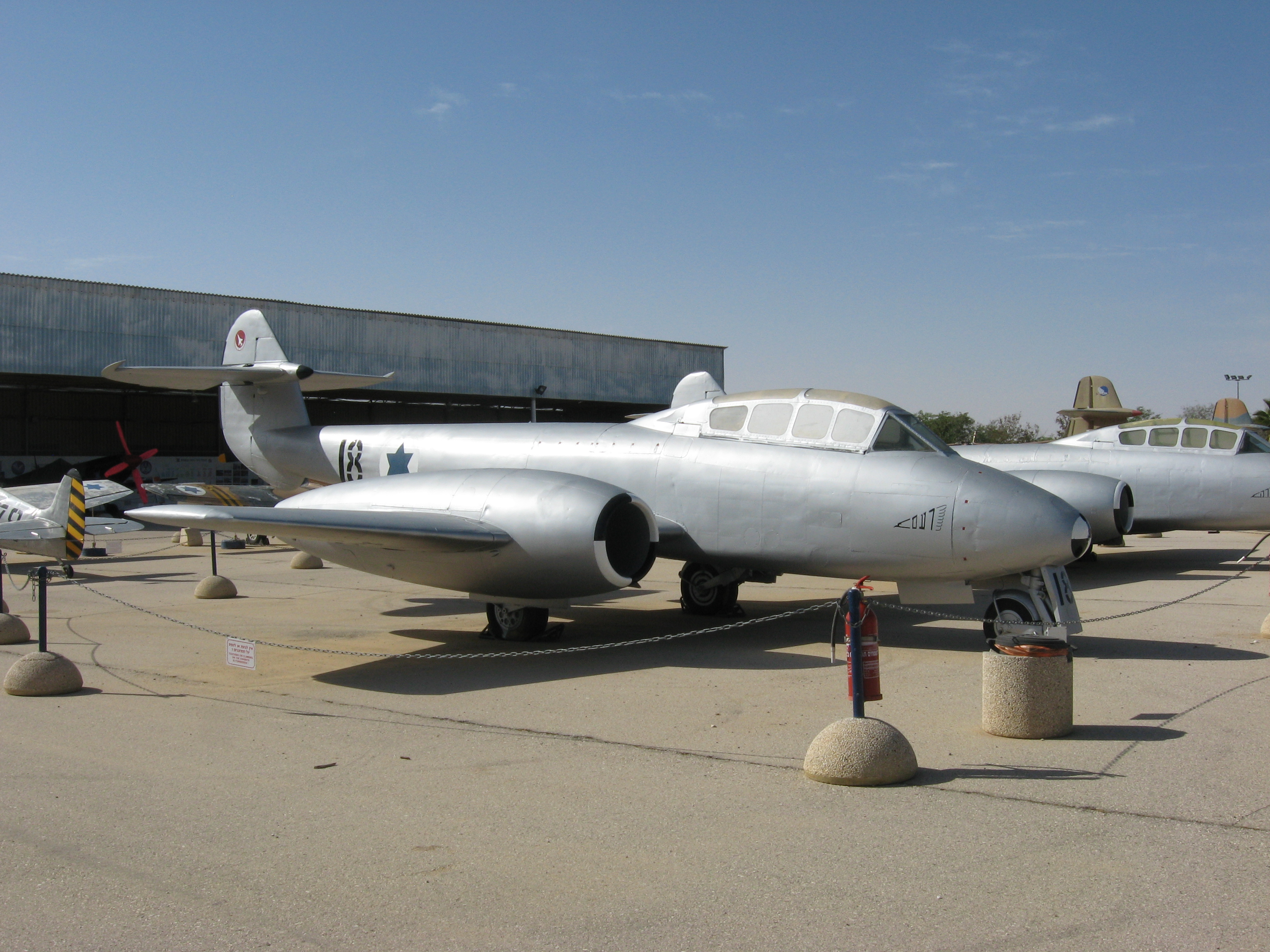
Gloster Meteor T.7 18 "Ra'am" (Thunder) at Hatzerim in 2010.

The Israeli Air Force received 4 Meteor T.7s, 12 F.8s, 7 FR.9s and 6 NF.13s.

On display

- Meteor T.7 marked 13, Ramat David Air Force Base Collection.
- Meteor T.7 marked 15, Israeli Air Force Museum, Hatzerim.
- Meteor T.7 marked 17, Rishon LeZion - Israeli Center for Sport Aviation.
- Meteor T.7 marked 18, ex-WL466, Israeli Air Force Museum, Hatzerim.
- Meteor T.7/8 marked 21, Israeli Air Force Museum, Hatzerim.
- Meteor T.8 marked 06, Israeli Air Force Museum, Hatzerim
- Meteor T.8 marked 40, Israeli Air Force Museum, Hatzerim
- Meteor FR.9, ex-WX975, marked 31, Ramat David Air Force Base Collection.
- Meteor FR.9, ex-WL259, marked 37, Israeli Air Force Museum, Hatzerim.
- Meteor NF.13, marked 119, Tel Nof AFB Collection.
- Meteor NF.13 4X-FND, ex-WM309, marked 50, Israeli Air Force Museum, Hatzerim.
- Meteor NF.13 4X-FNE, ex-WM320, marked 157, Israeli Air Force Museum, Hatzerim.
- Meteor NF.13 4X-FNB, ex-WM334, marked 51, Israeli Air Force Museum, Hatzerim.

=== Malta ===
Stored or under restoration

- Meteor T.7 WL360, Malta Aviation Museum workshops.

On display

- Malta NF.14 WS774, Malta Aviation Museum.
- Meteor F.8 WK914, Malta Aviation Museum (new arrival, ex-Mallom). Painted as WK714, it has a FR.9 nose.

=== New Zealand ===
- Meteor TT.20 WD767, Classic Aircraft Collection - Dairy Flat, Silverdale, Auckland.
- Meteor F.8 A77-867, ex-WK685, Ashburton Aviation Museum, Ashburton. After the Korean War joined the reformed Australian 77 Sqn. in December 1955.

=== Netherlands ===
The Royal Netherlands Air Force received 65 Meteor F.4s, 43 T.7s and 160 F.8s.

Stored or under restoration

- Meteor F.8 I-207, painted as 7E-5, Nationaal Militair Museum, Soest.

On display

- Meteor F.4 I-69, ex-VZ409, Nationaal Militair Museum, Soest.
- Meteor T.7 I-19, ex-WH223, Nationaal Militair Museum, Soest.
- Meteor T.7 I-320, ex-VW417, Vliegbasis Leeuwarden.
- Meteor F.8 3W-50, Lelystad Aviodrome Museum, Lelystad. Dutch Built.

=== Sweden ===
Stored or under restoration

- Meteor T.7 SE-CAS, ex-WF833, Linköping Flygvapenmuseum, Linköping.

On display

- Meteor T.7, bought from Gloster by the Swedish Air Force as a Target Towing aircraft SE-DCC, was for year incorrectly painted as WS774 in museum. Ex-G-AMCJ originally Gloster's Ground Attack Fighter Demonstrator (Reaper) based on an F.8, later ex-G-ANSO used by Gloster for Air Photography before sale to Sweden. Now being restored at Svedinos Bil och Flygmuseum, Slöinge.

=== United Kingdom ===
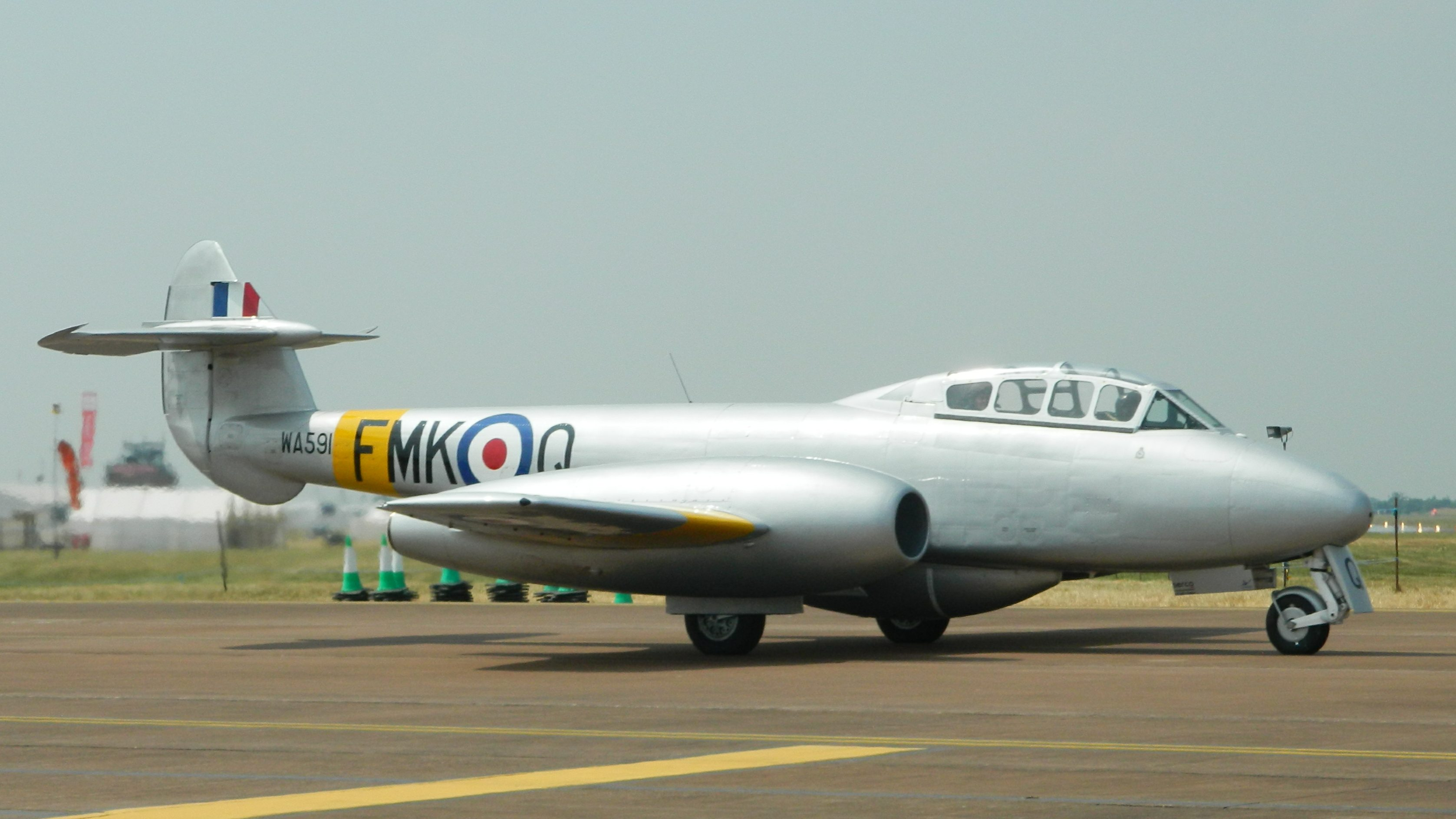
T.7 G-BWMF painted as WA591 in 2013

Airworthy

- Meteor T.7 G-JWMA ex-WA638, used by Martin-Baker Ltd since 1952 to test ejection seats. Based at Chalgrove Airfield, near Watlington, Oxfordshire.
- Meteor T.7 G-JSMA ex-WL419, used by Martin-Baker Ltd since 1952 to test ejection seats. Based at Chalgrove Airfield, near Watlington, Oxfordshire.

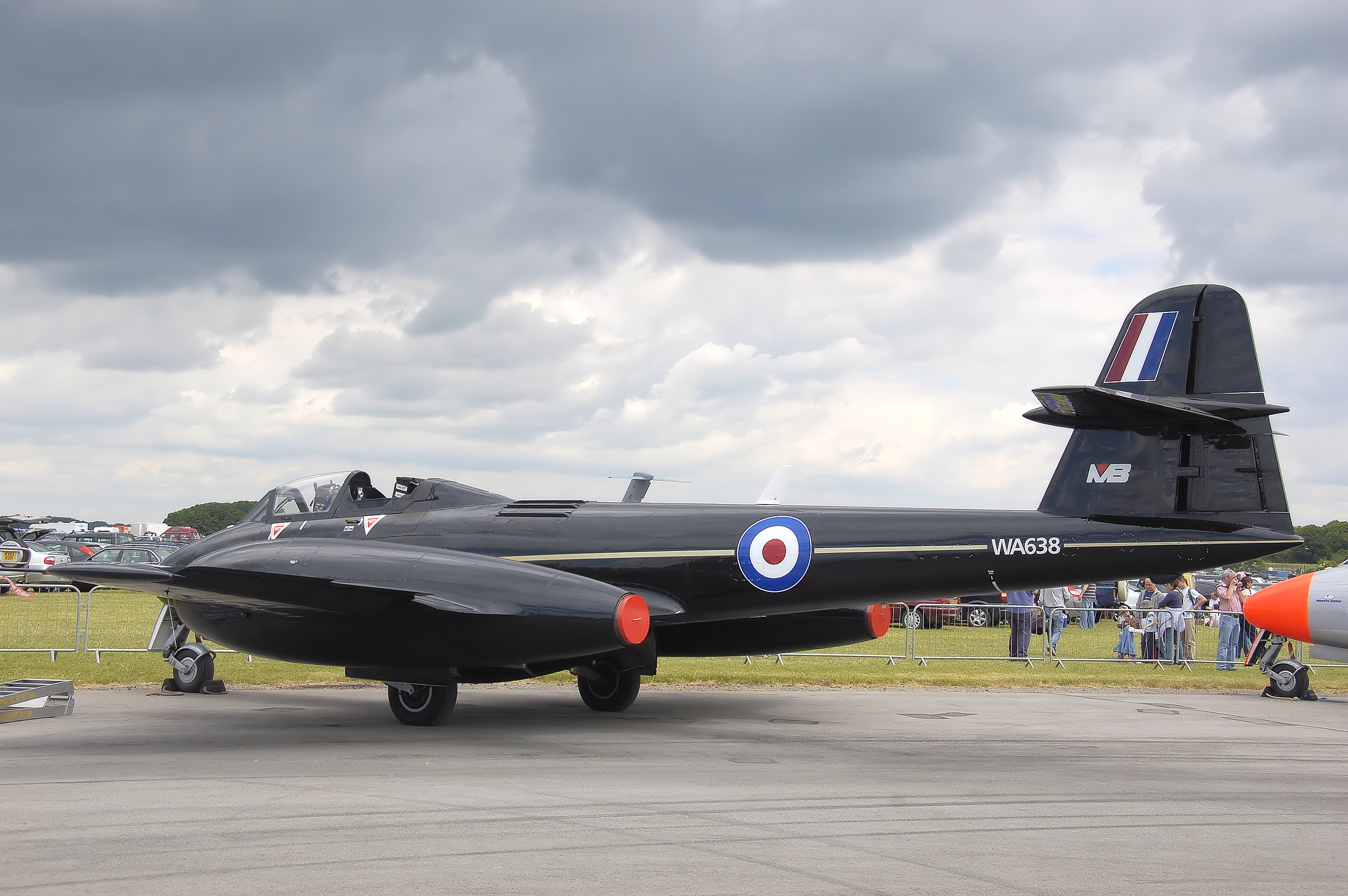
Meteor T.7 WA638 used by Martin-Baker for ejection seat development: non-standard canopy and F.8 tail. 2008

Stored or under restoration

- Meteor T.7 WS103 of the Fleet Air Arm Museum's reserve collection is stored at Cobham Hall, Yeovilton, Somerset.
- Meteor NF.14 WS807 of the Jet Age Museum is stored at Gloucestershire Airport.
- Meteor TT.20 WM292 of the Fleet Air Arm Museum's reserve collection is stored at Cobham Hall, Yeovilton, Somerset.
- F.9/40 DG202/G first prototype, Stored at the Royal Air Force Museum Midlands

On display

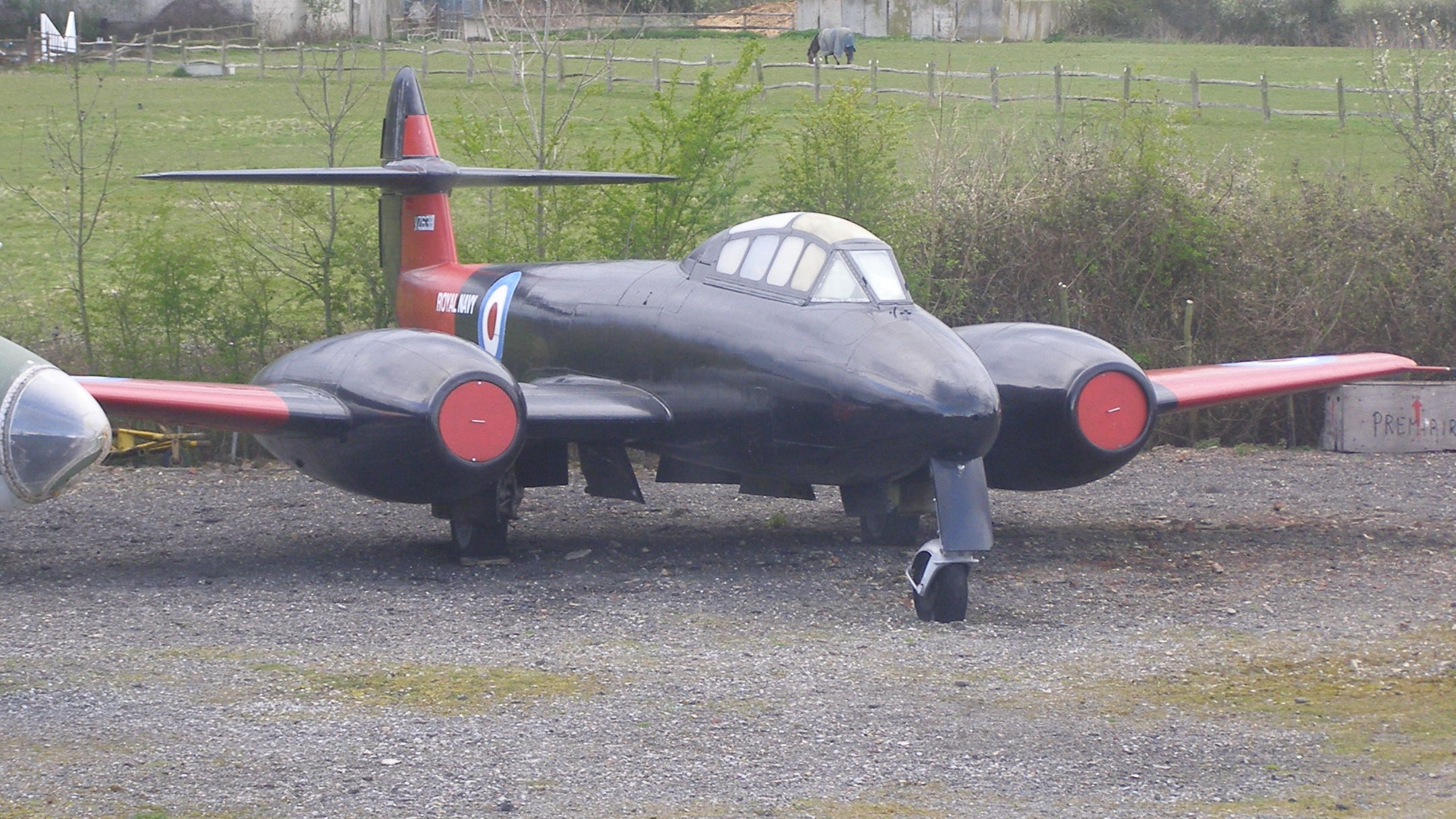
Meteor T.7 VZ638 at the Gatwick Aviation Museum in 2008.

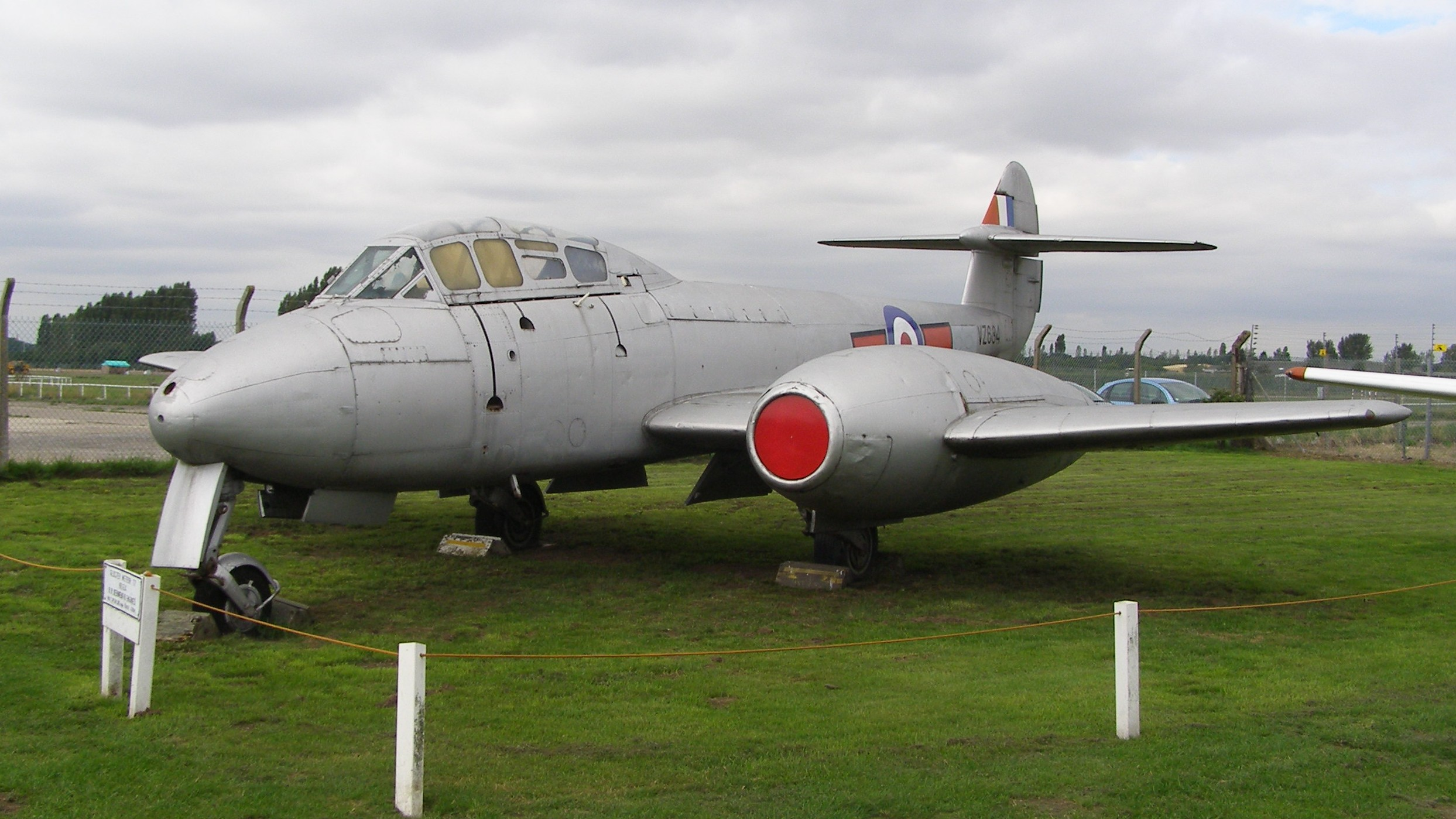
Meteor T.7 VZ634 at the Newark Air Museum in 2006.

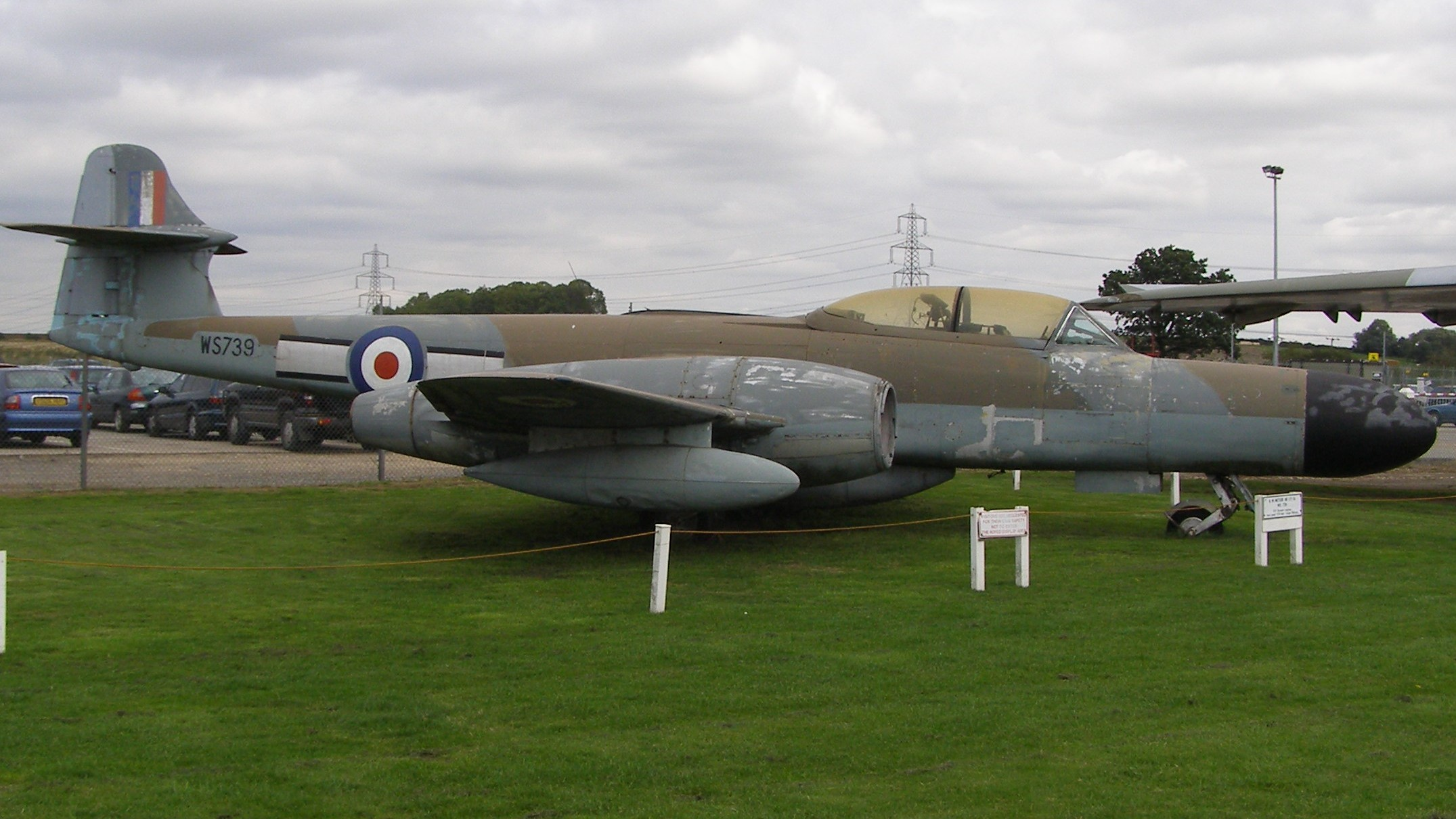
Meteor NF.14 WS739 at the Newark Air Museum in 2006.

- Meteor F.4 EE531, Midland Air Museum, Coventry Airport Baginton, Warwickshire. Oldest Meteor in the UK; only the Argentine I-027, ex-EE527, is older. The 8 prototypes DG202-9/G did not bear the name.
- Meteor F.4 EE549, Tangmere Military Aviation Museum, Chichester, W. Sussex. Set world absolute speed record of 616 mph (991 km/h) on 7 September 1946.
- Meteor T.7 VW453, Jet Age Museum, Staverton, Gloucestershire.
- Meteor T.7 VZ634, Newark Air Museum, Newark-on-Trent, Nottinghamshire.
- Meteor T.7 VZ638, Gatwick Aviation Museum, Charlwood, Surrey.
- Meteor T.7 (mod) WA634, Ulster Aviation Society, Long Kesh, Northern Ireland
- Meteor T.7 WA622, South Yorkshire Aircraft Museum, Doncaster, S. Yorkshire.
- Meteor T.7 WF825, Montrose Air Station Heritage Centre.
- Meteor T.7 WF784 South Wales Aviation Museum, St. Athan, Wales
- Meteor T.7 WH132, RAF Leconfield, East Yorkshire.
- Meteor T.7 WH166, Birlingham, Worcestershire. Private collection.
- Meteor T.7 WL332, RAF Coltishall Heritage Centre, Coltishall
- Meteor T.7 WL345, Cockpit/nose section is from WL360. Middlezoy Aerodrome/ RAF Westonzoyland, Somerset.
- Meteor T.7 WL375, Dumfries and Galloway Aviation Museum, Dumfries, Dumfries & Galloway, Scotland.
- Meteor T.7 WL405, South Wales Aviation Museum, St. Athan, Wales
- Meteor F.8 WA984, Fishburn Airfield, County Durham
- Meteor F (TT).8 WF643, Norfolk and Suffolk Aviation Museum, Flixton, Suffolk.
- Meteor F.8 WH291, Speke Aerodrome Heritage Group, Crowne Plaza Liverpool John Lennon Airport Hotel, Merseyside
- Meteor F.8 WH301, RAF Museum Hendon, London.
- Meteor F.8 WH364, Jet Age Museum, Staverton, Gloucestershire.
- Meteor F.8 WK654, City of Norwich Aviation Museum, Norwich Airport, Norfolk. Painted as WL135.
- Meteor F.8 WK935, Newark Air Museum, Newark-on-Trent, Nottinghamshire. The prone pilot Meteor.
- Meteor F.8 WK991, Imperial War Museum Duxford, Cambridgeshire.
- Meteor F.8 WL168, Yorkshire Air Museum, Elvington, North Yorkshire. Painted as WK864.
- Meteor F.8 WL181, North East Land, Sea and Air Museums, Sunderland, Tyne & Wear. Repaint almost complete as of October 2010.
- Meteor FR.9 VZ608, Newark Air Museum, Newark-on-Trent, Nottinghamshire.
- Meteor NF.11 WD686, Wattisham Airfield, Suffolk
- Meteor NF.11 WD790, Boscombe Down Aviation Collection, Salisbury
- Meteor NF.11 G-LOSM ex-WM167 of the Classic British Jets Collection is being maintained in taxiable condition at Bruntingthorpe after making its last flight on 5 January 2019.
- Meteor NF.12 WS692, Newark Air Museum, Newark-on-Trent, Nottinghamshire.
- Meteor NF.13 4X-FNA, ex-Israeli (IDF-AF), previously mostly WM366,
- Meteor NF.13 WM367 (cockpit section) on static display at East Midlands Aeropark.
- Meteor NF.14 WM261, National Museum of Flight, East Lothian, Scotland. Ex-G-ARCX, Ferranti's radar development test-bed. NF.11 conversion.
- Meteor NF.14 WS726, Park Lane, Royton, Greater Manchester.
- Meteor NF.14 WS739, Newark Air Museum, Newark-on-Trent, Nottinghamshire.
- Meteor NF.14 WS760, Aeropark, East Midlands Airport, Castle Donington, Leicestershire.
- Meteor NF.14 WS776, Bournemouth Aviation Museum, Dorset.
- Meteor NF.14 WS788, Yorkshire Air Museum, Elvington, North Yorkshire.
- Meteor NF.14 WS792, Brighouse Caravan Park, Borgue, Dumfries & Galloway, Scotland.
- Meteor NF.14 WS832, Solway Aviation Museum, Carlisle Lake District Airport, Cumbria.
- Meteor NF.14 WS838, Midland Air Museum, Coventry Airport Baginton, Warwickshire.
- Meteor NF.14 WS843, Royal Air Force Museum Midlands, Shropshire.
- Meteor D.16 WH453, Bentwaters Cold War Museum, Suffolk. This aircraft is being restored to its original F.8 configuration.
- Meteor D.16 WK800, Boscombe Down Aviation Collection, Wiltshire. Ex-F.8.
- Meteor TT.20 WD646, RAF Manston History Museum, Manston Airport, Kent. Painted as WD615.
- Meteor TT.20 WM224, Aeropark, East Midlands Airport, Castle Donington, Leicestershire.

=== United States ===
Airworthy

- Meteor T.7 N313Q, ex-G-BWMF, ex-WA591, Planes of Fame Air Museum, Chino, California

Under restoration

- Meteor F.4 N229VT, ex-VT229, Fantasy of Flight, Polk City, Florida.

On display

- Meteor F.4 VT260, Planes of Fame, Chino, California.
- Meteor NF.11/TT.20 WD592, Air Force Flight Test Center Museum, Edwards Air Force Base, California.
- Meteor T.7 WF877, Pima Air and Space Museum, Tucson, Arizona
