= Gloster Javelin =

British interceptor aircraft

Javelin
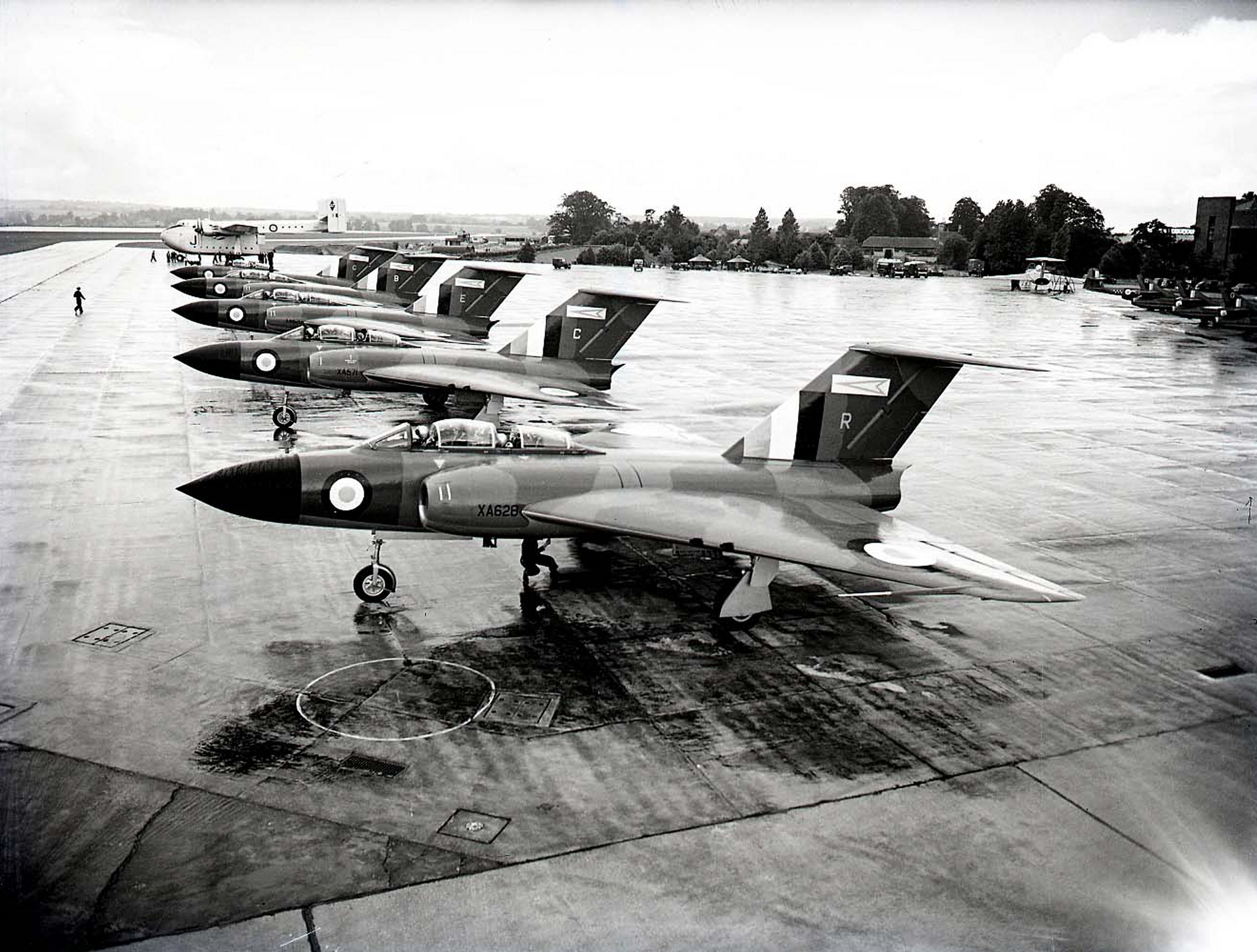

General information
- Type: All-weather fighter-interceptor
- Manufacturer: Gloster Aircraft Company
- Primary user: Royal Air Force
- Number built: 436

History
- Introduction date: 29 February 1956
- First flight: 26 November 1951
- Retired: April 1968
- Variant: Gloster P.370

The Gloster Javelin is a twin-engined all-weather interceptor aircraft designed and produced by the Gloster Aircraft Company. It was operated by the Royal Air Force from the mid-1950s until the late 1960s and was the final aircraft design to bear the Gloster name.

The Javelin was designed in response to specification F.44/46 during the late 1940s and early 1950s as high-performance night fighter capable of all-weather operations. It was a T-tailed delta-wing aircraft powered by a pair of Armstrong Siddeley Sapphire turbojet engines. Following a protracted development period, the Javelin was introduced to squadron service during 1956. During its service life, it received upgrades to its engines, radar and weapons, which included the De Havilland Firestreak air-to-air missile.

The Javelin was replaced in the interceptor role by the English Electric Lightning, a supersonic aircraft capable of flying at more than double the speed of the Javelin. The Lightning entered service with the RAF only a few years after the Javelin. Fighter bomber and aerial reconnaissance variants were proposed, as well as the supersonic Gloster thin-wing Javelin, but none were pursued. The Javelin had a relatively short service life, the last examples were withdrawn from operational service in 1968 following the phased-in introduction of the Lightning. During this time both aircraft were operated by the RAF.

== Development ==
=== F.44/46 ===
In the aftermath of the Second World War, Britain identified a threat posed by the jet-powered strategic bomber and atomic weaponry and thus placed a great emphasis on developing aerial supremacy through continuing to advance its fighter technology, even following the end of the conflict. Initial planning was based on the premise that another war was at least ten years away, and development was limited mostly to paper projects. Several events in the late 1940s led to this timeline being moved up.

In 1947, the Air Ministry issued a requirement for a high-performance night fighter under specification F.44/46. It called for a two-seat design that would intercept enemy aircraft at heights of up to at least 40,000 feet. It would also have to reach a maximum speed of 525 kn (973 km/h, 605 mph) at this height, be able to perform rapid ascents and attain an altitude of 45,000 feet within ten minutes of the pilot pressing the starter switch.

Additional criteria given in the requirement included a minimum flight endurance of two hours, a takeoff distance of 1,500 yards, structural strength required for 4g manoeuvres at high speed and for the aircraft to incorporate aircraft interception radar, multi-channel VHF radio and various navigational aids. The aircraft would also be required to be economical to produce, at a rate of ten per month for an estimated total of 150 aircraft.

=== Gloster designs ===
Gloster Aircraft produced the only British jet aircraft to be operational during the war, the Gloster Meteor. After the war, design studies and schemes for the Meteor included layouts with a delta wing or just a delta portion for the outer wing. Other schemes moved the engines to the fuselage with a delta wing layout.

P.228, drawn up in 1946, was essentially a two-seat Meteor with slightly swept wings. A similar design was also offered to the Royal Navy as the P.231.p.379 The later-issued P.234 and P.238 of early 1947 had adopted many of the features that would be distinctive of the Javelin, including the large delta wing and tailplane, and were based on the Rolls-Royce AJ65 engine (better known as the Rolls-Royce Avon). The two differed primarily in role; P.234 was a single-seat day fighter with a V-tail, while P.238 was a two-seat night fighter with a mid-mounted delta tailplane.pp.380-381

Design iterations for both concepts continued. P.240 of April 1947 was Meteor-like in form but moved the engines from the wings to the fuselage, and added a slight sweep to the leading edge of the wing, producing a somewhat delta wing shape. P.240 also replaced the Rolls-Royce Derwent engines with the Metropolitan-Vickers F.9 Sapphire, which later was developed into the Armstrong Siddeley Sapphire. The all-delta layout of P.238 was also updated as P.241, which used an all-delta horizontal stabilizer in a T-tail arrangement. P.241 had a close resemblance to the final Javelin design.

The Air Ministry released more detailed specifications on 17 Jun 1949, as F.4/48. Gloster responded with two further updated designs, P.300, which was essentially a quick update to the Meteor with two seats and newer Derwent engines, and the P.316/P.317, another update to the delta layout mounting the Sapphire engines. The P.316 and 317 differed primarily in role, 316 was a single-seat design lacking radar and mounting up to four 1,000 pounds (450 kg) bombs in containers under the fuselage, while 317 was a two-seat design with radar and some form of heavy armament to be determined.

The RAF requirements were changed, mainly for the radar equipment and armament; Gloster also initiated some changes as further research was conducted into the aerodynamic behaviour of the new swept and delta wings, as well as use of the new Armstrong Siddeley Sapphire turbojet engine.

=== Prototypes ===
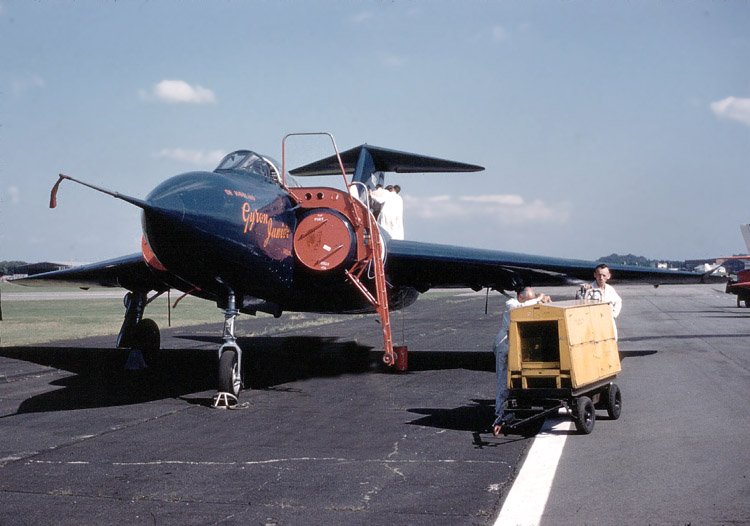
Gloster Javelin, de Havilland engine test bed aircraft, at Farnborough

On 13 April 1949, the Ministry of Supply issued instructions to two aircraft manufacturers, Gloster and de Havilland, to each construct four airworthy prototypes of their competing designs to meet the requirement, as well as one airframe each for structural testing. These prototype aircraft were the Gloster GA.5, designed by Richard Walker, and the de Havilland DH.110, the latter of which held the advantage of also being under consideration for the Royal Navy. Development was considerably delayed through political cost-cutting measures when the number of Javelin prototypes was reduced to two. When it was realized that two weren't enough to do all the development flying the decision was reversed. The delay in the development programme led to the unusual situation where the first production Javelin (XA544) flew within two days of the fifth prototype aircraft (WT836).

The first prototype was completed in 1951. An unusual feature of the prototypes was the opaque canopy over the rear cockpit. It had been believed that visibility outside the cockpit was unnecessary and a hindrance to the observer; the only external view available was through 2 small 'portholes'. Following a month of ground testing, on 26 November 1951, the first prototype conducted its first flight at Moreton Valence airfield. Bill Waterton, Gloster's Chief Test Pilot, would later describe the Javelin as being "as easy to fly as an Anson", although also expressing concern over its inadequate power controls. Disaster nearly struck during one test flight when aerodynamic flutter caused the elevators to detach in mid-flight; despite the lack of control surfaces, Bill Waterton was able to land the aircraft using tailplane trimming and engine thrust for pitch control. He was awarded the George Medal for his actions to retrieve flight data from the burning aircraft.

The second prototype (WD808) received a modified wing in 1953. After initial testing by Waterton, it was passed to another Gloster test pilot, Peter Lawrence (Note: Peter G. Lawrence MBE had been a test pilot at Blackburn Aviation and a racing pilot.) for his opinion. On 11 June 1953, the aircraft crashed during testing. Lawrence had ejected from the aircraft, but too late (at about 400 ft (120 m)), and was killed. The Javelin had experienced a "deep stall"; where an abrupt loss of lift and consequent high sink rate is combined with the already-low forward speed at the normal stall. This places the elevators in the low-energy wing wake, leaving them useless. Without elevator control, Lawrence was unable to regain control and the aircraft dropped from the sky. A stall warning device was later developed and implemented for the Javelin.

The third prototype (WT827), and the first to be fitted with operational equipment including radar, first flew on 7 March 1953. The fourth prototype (WT830) was passed to the Aeroplane and Armament Experimental Establishment (A&AEE) for trials and the fifth prototype, WT836, made its first flight in July 1954. On 4 July 1954, a prototype Javelin accidentally achieved supersonic speed during a test flight, the pilot having been distracted by an oxygen supply failure.

=== Production and further development ===
The official production order for the Javelin was issued in mid-1953; as the Gloster Meteor was still being actively produced by Gloster, considerable elements of the Javelin were subcontracted out to other aviation companies owned by the Hawker Siddeley Group, such as Armstrong Whitworth. While some delays were incurred, the Javelin's status as a "super priority" for production helped to minimize the time involved in producing each aircraft. On 22 July 1954, XA544, the first production aircraft, took flight at Hucclecote. Production was assisted by a large order placed by the United States Air Force, purchasing aircraft for the RAF as part of the Mutual Defense Aid Program at a price of £36.8 million.

On 21 October 1954, a pilot attached to Gloster from RAE Farnborough was killed while flying Javelin XA546 having entered what appeared to be an intentional spin. On 8 December 1955, a service test pilot S/L Dick was testing XA561 for the A&AEE when the aircraft entered a flat spin at 40,000 feet (12,000 m) during manoeuvres testing the buffet boundary, which the anti-spin parachute could not stop, and he chose to eject at 8,000 feet (2,400 m). Following this, a stall-warning device was developed for the Javelin.

By the end of 1956, the Javelin was up to a FAW 7 variant, which was the first to meet the specifications of the original Air Ministry requirement, and which was to become the definitive version of the aircraft (most of which were later altered to the FAW 9 standard). The Javelin was evolving so quickly that deliveries of the FAW 8 began before FAW 7 production had ended. As a result, the final 80 FAW 7 aircraft went straight from the factory into storage, eventually flying after being re-manufactured as FAW 9s. A total of 427 Javelins were produced in all variants, plus seven prototypes. While there had been considerable interest from several NATO air forces, there were no export orders for the Javelin.

== Design ==
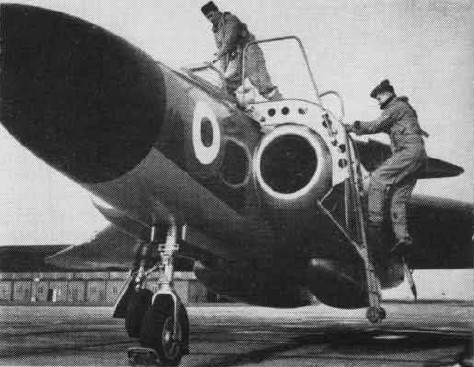
Two U.S. Marine Corps officers leaving a Javelin FAW.7 at RAF Duxford, 1959

The Javelin was the RAF's first purpose-built all-weather interceptor aircraft. Previous aircraft which filled this role were conversions from existing day-fighter and fighter-bomber types (Meteor, Vampire, Venom).

Aerodynamic features of the type included its adoption of the new delta wing and a large tailplane. Fuel and armaments were housed in the delta wing, and the engines and crew in the fuselage. The delta wing and tailplane combination was incorporated to provide the manoeuvrability required at high speed and for the aircraft to be controllable at low landing speeds. In one instance during testing, when both elevators had been torn off by elevator flutter, the Javelin remained controllable by using both the trimming capability of the large tailplane and thrust changes to control pitch. Changes from the prototypes included alterations to the rear fuselage and a central "pen nib" fairing extending beyond the engine nozzles, to eliminate buffeting of the rudder by the jet exhaust, and increased sweepback of the wing's leading edge to improve high-speed handling.

The Javelin was easy to fly on one engine. It was common to fly on one engine during low-level patrols in Malaysia, during the Indonesian Confrontation, to conserve fuel and prolong the patrol time. The flight controls were fully power-assisted and production aircraft adopted a hydraulic 'feel' system for the pilot. The Javelin had fully variable airbrakes on the wing upper and lower surfaces; they were very effective (reducing the engines to idle and opening the airbrakes produced a 1g deceleration), allowing pilots to make rapid descents and equally rapid landings. The turnaround time between sorties was significantly shorter than with the preceding Gloster Meteor, due to improved ground accessibility and engine starting sequence. Unlike the Meteor, the Javelin was fitted with ejector seats, at the introduction to service of the type. No other operational fighter of the West had a bigger wing, in terms of area, than the Javelin, and in the USSR, only the Tu-128 had a larger (by about 10m2) wing.

In spite of the aircraft's unorthodox aerodynamic features, the Javelin had a fairly conventional structure and materials, using aluminium alloy throughout, except for some use of steel edging members. The fuselage was composed of four sections, the nose (containing the radar radome), the front fuselage, centre fuselage and rear fuselage; the nose and rear fuselage were removable for servicing and easy replacement. The engines were on either side of the centre fuselage, the internal space in the centre containing the service bay that housed much of the aircraft's electrical, hydraulic, and avionics subsystems. The engine air intakes were placed on the forward fuselage, running directly from beneath the cockpit rearwards into the delta wing. Electricity was provided by a pair of 6 kilowatt, 24-volt generators driven by the auxiliary gearbox; inverters provided AC power for equipment such as some flight instruments and the radar.

== Variants ==
A total of 435 aircraft were built by Gloster (302 built) and Armstrong-Whitworth (133 built); both companies at that time were part of the Hawker Siddeley group. Several were converted to different marks (sometimes repeatedly).

Gloster GA.5
Five prototypes GA.5s were built by Gloster, the first order for four aircraft to Specification F.4/48 was placed by the Air Ministry on 17 Jun 1949. Subsequently two aircraft were cancelled but additional prototype aircraft were ordered in 1951:

- WD804 - Unarmed first prototype with Sapphire Sa.3 engines first flown from Moreton Valance on 26 November 1951.
- WD808 - Unarmed second prototype first flew on 21 August 1952.
- WT827 - First flew 7 March 1953 it was the first armed aircraft and the first fitted with a radar.
- WT830 - First aircraft with powered controls, first flew 14 January 1954. Used for aerodynamic and stress trials.
- WT836 - Production standard aircraft with improved canopy. first flew 20 July 1954

FAW 1
Initial version with Armstrong Siddeley Sapphire Sa.6 engines with 8,000 lbf (35.6 kN thrust) each, British AI.17 radar, four 30 mm ADEN cannon in wings, and electrically operated tail plane;. The designation FAW 1, sometimes written FAW.1 or F(AW) Mk 1, stood for "Fighter, All-Weather Mark 1". First flown on 25 July 1954, forty aircraft were built at Hucclecote, mainly used for trials and the first aircraft to be delivered to 46 Squadron at RAF Odiham.
FAW 2
Replaced the AI.17 radar with U.S.-made Westinghouse AN/APQ-43 radar (known as the AI.22 in RAF service), hydraulically operated tail; 30 produced.
T 3
Dual-control trainer version with no radar, bulged canopy for improved instructor visibility. All-moving tailplane, lengthened fuselage to compensate for altered centre of gravity, adding additional internal fuel. Retained four cannon; 22 production aircraft and one prototype.
FAW 4
Similar to FAW 1, with the addition of vortex generators on wings for improved stall characteristics, as well as an all-moving tailplane. Fitted with the original AI.17 radar of the FAW.1. 50 produced.
FAW 5
Based on FAW 4, with revised wing structure incorporating additional fuel tanks, provision for missile pylons (never fitted); 64 produced.
FAW 6
Combined FAW 2's American radar with the revised wing of the FAW.5. 33 produced. Snub nosed with AI.22 radar installed.
FAW 7
Introduced new Sa.7 engines with 11,000 lbf (48.9 kN) thrust each, powered rudder, extended rear fuselage. Armed with two 30 mm ADEN plus four Firestreak air-to-air missiles. FAW 7s equipping two squadrons were armed with four ADEN cannon only; 142 produced. AI.17 radar installed.
FAW 8
Upgraded Sa.7R engines with reheat, raising thrust to 12,300 lbf (54.7 kN) thrust above 20,000 ft (6,100 m); at lower altitudes, the limitation of the fuel pump caused a loss of cold thrust. New "drooped" wing leading edge and auto-stabiliser for better handling. Snub nosed with AI.22 radar installed.
FAW 9
A total of 118 FAW 7s refitted with the revised wing and engines with reheat, of the Mk 8., 44 of these were fitted with refuelling probes as FAW 9F/R. AI.17 radar installed.
FAW 9R
R standing for "Range". A total of 40 of the 44 FAW 9F/R were refitted to carry underwing fuel tanks.

== Unproduced variants ==
Several variants were proposed and investigated but not produced, including aerial reconnaissance versions, a fighter bomber version with underwing panniers for bombs, and a supersonic variant with area-ruled fuselage, thinner wings, and a new tail. The "thin-wing Javelin" would have been capable of about Mach 1.6, with a higher ceiling than contemporary US designs. Initial work started with fitting a thinner-section wing to a Javelin fuselage but as the project developed the changes became so great that it would effectively have been a different aircraft albeit having an outward resemblance to the Javelin. The Gloster P.370 to F.153D for "Thin Wing Gloster All Weather Fighter, an update of the initial F.118 specification was ordered in 1954; a prototype XG336 along with two pre-production aircraft. The final proposed version of the thin-wing Gloster (P.376), just before cancellation, was a large aircraft carrying two Red Dean all-aspect missiles as a possible contender for Operational Requirement F.155. Both the aircraft, then under construction, and the missile were cancelled in 1957.

== Operators ==
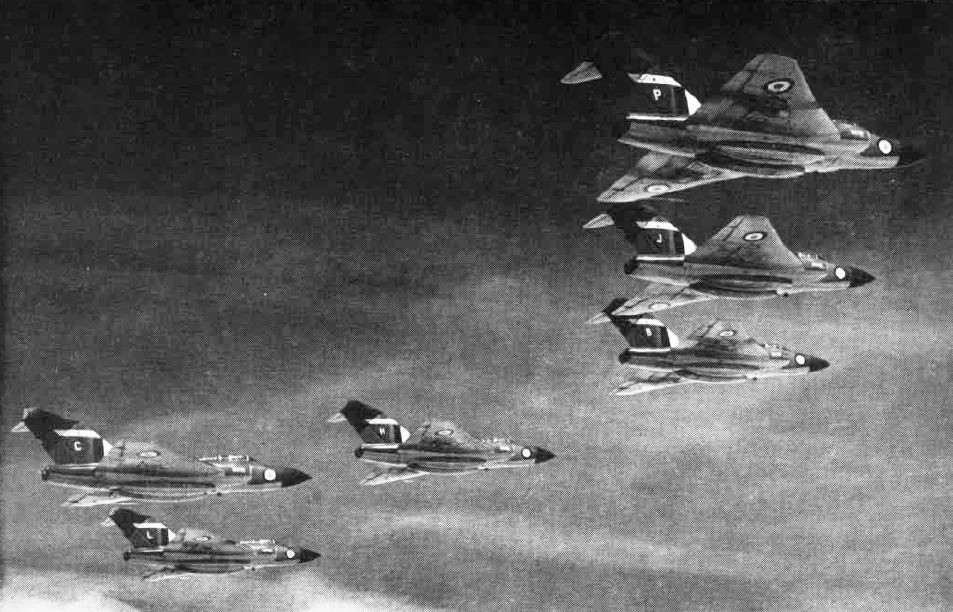
Six Gloster Javelin FAW.7 of No. 64 Squadron, 1959

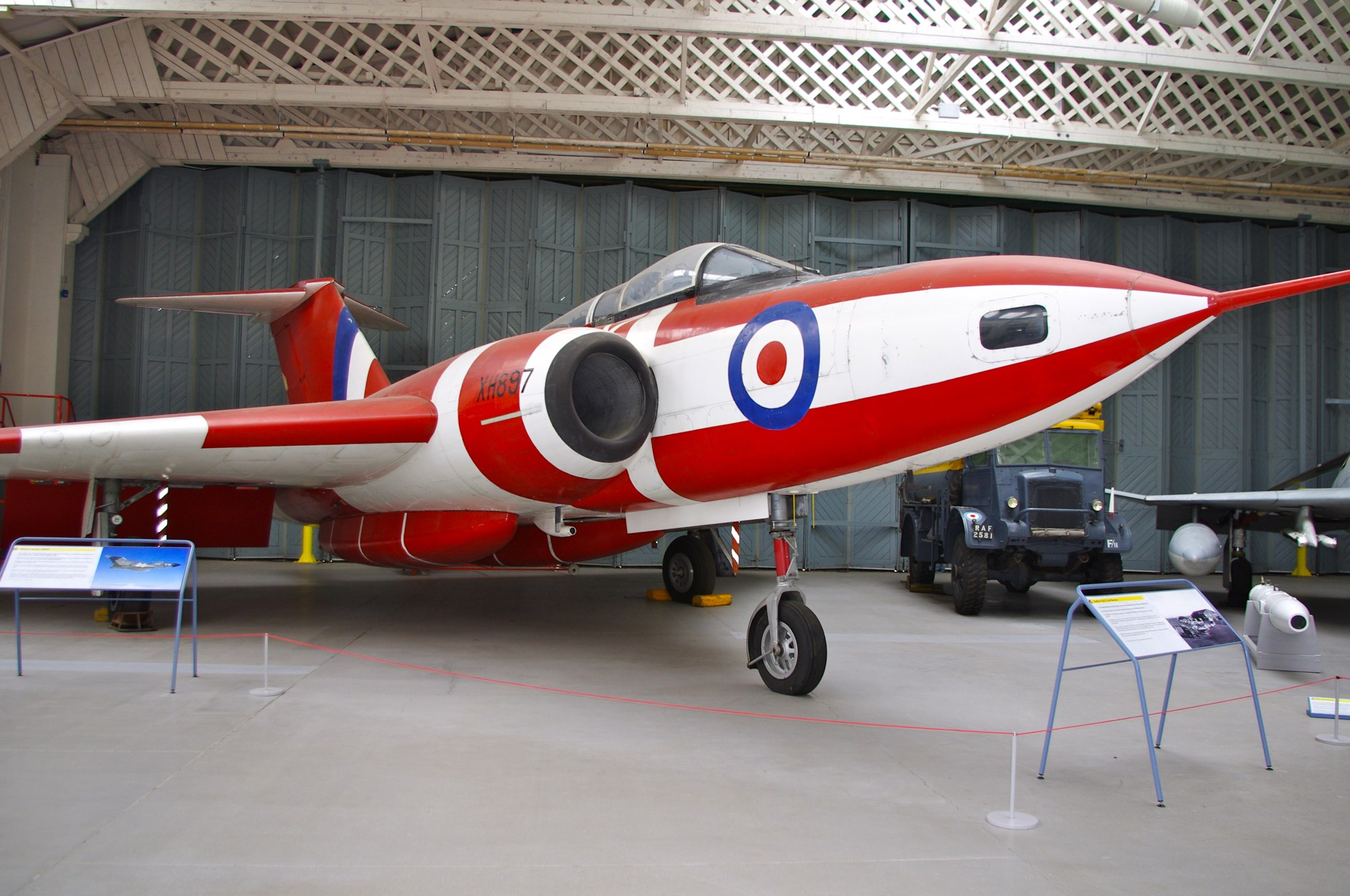
Preserved Javelin at the Imperial War Museum, Duxford, 2011

United Kingdom

- Royal Air Force
  - Fighter Command
    - No. 23 Squadron RAF : April 1957 to September 1964, initially based at RAF Horsham St Faith and then at RAF Coltishall, moving to RAF Leuchars in March 1963. It was equipped with the FAW.4 until April 1959, when it began to receive FAW.7s, which were in turn replaced by FAW.9s from April 1960. It re-equipped with the English Electric Lightning in September 1964.
    - No. 25 Squadron RAF : March 1959 to November 1962, based at RAF Waterbeach until October 1961 when it moved to RAF Leuchars. It operated FAW.7s until December 1959 when it received FAW.9s.
    - No. 29 Squadron RAF : November 1957 to February 1963 when it transferred to the Near East Air Force. It was based at RAF Acklington until July 1958 when it moved to RAF Leuchars, moving to Cyprus in February 1963. It operated FAW.6s until April 1961, when it received FAW.9s.
    - No. 33 Squadron RAF (1958–1962 disbanded)
    - No. 41 Squadron RAF (1958–1963 disbanded)
    - No. 46 Squadron RAF (1956–1961 disbanded)
    - No. 64 Squadron RAF (1958–1965 transfer to Far East Air Force)
    - No. 72 Squadron RAF (1959–1961 disbanded)
    - No. 85 Squadron RAF (1958–1963 disbanded)
    - No. 89 Squadron RAF (1958 re-numbered 85 Squadron)
    - No. 141 Squadron RAF (1957–1958 re-numbered 41 Squadron)
    - No. 151 Squadron RAF (1957–1961 disbanded)
  - RAF Germany
    - No. 3 Squadron RAF : January 1959 to December 1961, based at RAF Geilenkirchen and equipped with FAW.4s - re-equipped with the English Electric Canberra.
    - No. 5 Squadron RAF : January 1960 to October 1965, based at RAF Laarbruch until December 1962, and then at RAF Geilenkirchen. Equipped with FAW.4s until November 1962 and then FAW.9s. It returned to Fighter Command in the UK in October 1965 when it re-equipped with the Lightning.
    - No. 11 Squadron RAF : October 1960 to January 1966, based at RAF Geilenkirchen. Equipped with FAW.4s, initially, it was re-equipped with FAW.5s from March 1962 and FAW.9s from December 1962.
    - No. 87 Squadron RAF (1957–1961 disbanded)
    - No. 96 Squadron RAF
  - Near East Air Force
    - No. 29 Squadron RAF : February 1963 to May 1967, equipped with FAW.9s. It was based at RAF Nicosia, Cyprus until March 1964 when it moved to RAF Akrotiri. The squadron returned to Fighter Command and re-equipped with the Lightning in May 1967.
  - Far East Air Force
    - No. 60 Squadron RAF (1961–1968 disbanded)
    - No. 64 Squadron RAF (1965–1967 disbanded)
  - No. 1 Guided Weapons Development Squadron RAF Valley (Firestreak Trials)
  - No. 226 Operational Conversion Unit RAF
  - No. 228 Operational Conversion Unit RAF

== Aircraft on display ==
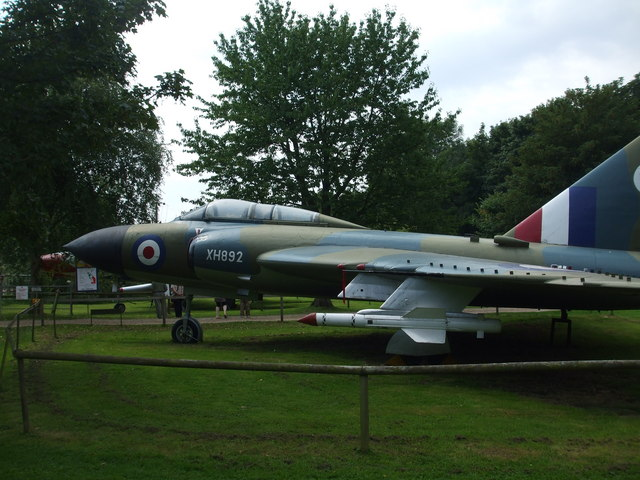
XH892 at the Norfolk and Suffolk Aviation Museum Flixton

=== Italy ===
- Javelin FAW9 XH768 as XH707 at the Parco Tematico & Museo dell'Aviazione " G. Casolari", Rimini.

=== South Africa ===
- Javelin FAW1 XA553 gate guard at Thunder City, Cape Town (former gate guardian at RAF Stanmore Park)
- Removed and scrapped 28 April 2024.

=== United Kingdom ===
- Javelin FAW1 XA564 at the National Cold War exhibition at the Royal Air Force Museum, Cosford, England.
- Javelin FAW4 XA634 at Gloucestershire Jet Age Museum, England in No. 228 Operational Conversion Unit RAF markings coded L. (Former gate guardian at RAF Leeming).
- Javelin FAW5 XA699 in No. 5 Squadron RAF markings at the Midland Air Museum, Coventry, England.
- Javelin FAW9 XH767 in No. 23 Squadron RAF markings at the Yorkshire Air Museum, Elvington, England.
- Javelin FAW9R XH892 at the Norfolk and Suffolk Aviation Museum Flixton, Suffolk, England.
- Javelin FAW9 XH897 at the Imperial War Museum Duxford, England. This Javelin was the last of its type to fly, being flown to Duxford on 24 January 1975 for preservation.
- Javelin FAW9 XH903 in No. 33 Squadron RAF markings coded G at the Jet Age Museum, Gloucestershire Airport, England on loan from the RAF Museum.
- Javelin FAW8 XH992 in No. 85 Squadron RAF markings coded P at the Newark Air Museum, Newark, England.

== Specifications (Gloster Javelin FAW Mk 9) ==
Gloster Javelin 3-view drawings

External videos
- Documentary on RAF operations with the Gloster Javelin

Data from Gloster Javelin : Profile Number 179

General characteristics

- Crew: 2
- Length: 56 ft 9 in (17.30 m)
- Wingspan: 52 ft (16 m)
- Height: 16 ft (4.9 m)
- Wing area: 927 sq ft (86.1 m^{2})
- Airfoil: root: RAE 101 (10%); tip: RAE 101 (8.9%)
- Empty weight: 24,000 lb (10,886 kg)
- Gross weight: 31,580 lb (14,324 kg)
- Max takeoff weight: 43,165 lb (19,579 kg)
- Powerplant: 2 × Armstrong Siddeley Sapphire 7R afterburning turbojet engines, 11,000 lbf (49 kN) thrust each dry, 12,300 lbf (55 kN) with afterburner

Performance

- Maximum speed: 710 mph (1,140 km/h, 620 kn) at 40,000 ft (12,000 m)
- Maximum speed: Mach 0.93
- Range: 954 mi (1,535 km, 829 nmi)
- Service ceiling: 52,800 ft (16,100 m)
- Rate of climb: 5,400 ft/min (27 m/s)
- Wing loading: 34 lb/sq ft (170 kg/m^{2})
- Thrust/weight: 0.79

Armament

- Guns: 4 × 30 mm ADEN cannon
- Missiles: Up to four de Havilland Firestreak air-to-air missiles

Avionics

- Westinghouse AN/APQ-43 radar

== See also ==
Aircraft of comparable role, configuration, and era

- Avro Canada CF-100 – Interceptor aircraft in service 1952-1981
- de Havilland Sea Vixen – Carrier-based fighter aircraft family
- Sud Aviation Vautour IIN

Related lists

- List of aircraft of the Royal Air Force
- List of fighter aircraft
