= Jet Age Museum =

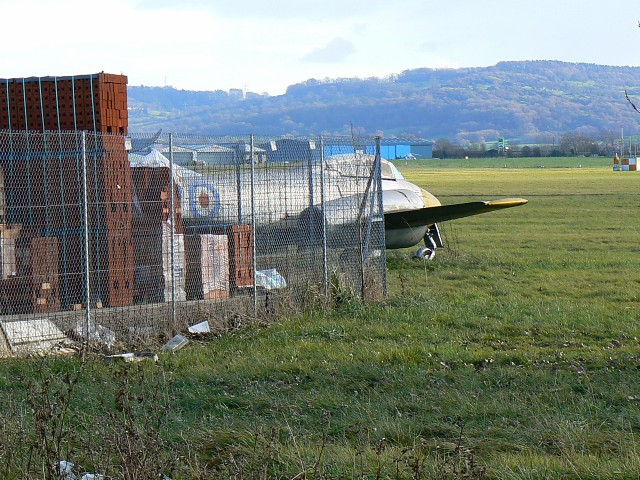
- Gloster Meteor at Gloucestershire Airport

- Location within Gloucestershire
- Location: Staverton, Gloucestershire
- Coordinates: 51°53′44″N 2°10′29″W
- Type: Aviation museum
- Website: http://www.jetagemuseum.org/

The Jet Age Museum is the trading name of the Gloucestershire Aviation Collection, an all-volunteer, charitable organisation dedicated to the preservation of Gloucestershire's aviation heritage. The aviation museum is located on the north side of Gloucestershire Airport, between Gloucester and Cheltenham. It houses a number of aircraft, aero engines, cockpits and other related exhibits. It is themed on the early development of jet aircraft, in particular the role played by the Gloster Aircraft Company and other local firms such as Dowty Rotol and Smiths Industries. The museum is also the custodian of the Russell Adams photographic archive.

== History ==
The organisation was formed in 1986 and established as a company limited by guarantee.

The museum first opened to the public at the Gloucester Trading Estate, the former Brockworth aerodrome. With the aid of grants and public donations, it began to amass a collection of aircraft. The museum's first significant public opening began with a temporary exhibition in a hangar adjacent to Gloucestershire Airport. This had to close in 2000 after it was announced the former wartime hangar was to be demolished. The aircraft were dispersed to a number of locations in Gloucestershire including, briefly, at the former GAC 'shadow' factory at Bentham. A workshop was established at Brockworth Court and the remaining airframes eventually made their way back to Gloucestershire Airport, where they were placed in open storage. In 2005, an Avro Anson in the collection was sold for restoration.

The museum made a number of unsuccessful bids to the Heritage Lottery Fund to construct a purpose-built facility before finally submitting plans for a building at Gloucestershire Airport. In January 2011 plans were approved for a new building to house the museum's collection. One year later, an agreement was reached for a 45 year lease of the land the building sits on.

The museum opened provisionally from 24 August 2013 and officially in May 2014. A Gloster Meteor was added in 2013 and a Gloster Javelin purchased from RAF Leeming in 2014 was moved to the museum a few months later. With these acquisitions, the museum had a significant number of aircraft on display outside and as a result announced a fundraising campaign for an extension in 2019.

== Collection ==
=== Aircraft on display ===
- Gloster Gamecock J7904 – reproduction
- Gloster E28/39 – replica
- Gloster Meteor F.8 WH364
- Gloster Meteor NF.13 WM366 – on loan
- Gloster Meteor T.7 VW453
- Gloster Meteor T.7 WF784
- Gloster Javelin FAW.9 XH903
- Hawker Hurricane V6799 – replica

=== Aircraft cockpits ===
- Avro Vulcan B.2 XM569
- Gloster Meteor F.3 EE425
- Hawker Hunter F.4 XE664
- Hawker Siddeley Trident 3B G-AWZU

=== Aircraft stored or under restoration ===
- Airspeed Horsa – replica cockpit
- Armstrong-Whitworth Meteor NF.14 WS807
- English Electric Canberra B.2 WK126 – on loan
- Gloster Gladiator II N5914
- Gloster Javelin FAW.4 XA634
- Hawker Typhoon Ia/Ib

== See also ==
- List of aerospace museums
