= RAF Moreton Valence =

Former Royal Air Force flying base in Gloucestershire, England

RAF Moreton Valence
- Near Moreton Valence, Gloucestershire in England

Site information
- Type: Royal Air Force station
- Owner: Ministry of Defence
- Operator: Royal Air Force
- Controlled by: RAF Flying Training Command

Location
- Shown within Gloucestershire RAF Moreton Valence (the United Kingdom)
- Coordinates: 51.787°N 2.296°W

Site history
- Built: 1939
- In use: 1939-1962

Royal Air Force Moreton Valence or more simply RAF Moreton Valence is a former Royal Air Force station located 9 kilometres (5.6 mi) southwest of Gloucester, Gloucestershire and 24 kilometres (15 mi) northwest of Cirencester, Gloucestershire, England.

== History ==
RAF Moreton Valence opened in 1939 and was closed in 1962. The airfield was situated between the A38 and B4008 roads east of the village of Moreton Valence, and was also known as Haresfield airfield. During the Second World War, it had three concrete runways and associated aircraft hangars including A1, blister, B1 and B2 types. It was a satellite of RAF Staverton and was used by an Advanced Flying Unit of Royal Air Force Flying Training Command. During the Second World War, it also hosted secret tests of the Armstrong Whitworth Albemarle bomber.

Beginning in October 1943, it was also used by Gloster aircraft for testing Meteor jet aircraft. Moreton Valence's runway had been extended to 6,000 feet to allow testing of the Meteor. Peter Cadbury flew as a test pilot for Glosters during the Second World War, and fondly remembered his first flight in a jet, at Moreton Valence. There were no two-seat versions, so his first solo in a Meteor would also be his first flight in one:

"When [check pilot] Michael Daunt was satisfied that I knew enough about the Meteor to be trusted to fly it, I was put in the cockpit . . .'Line up, set the rpm at 14,000, watch the jet pipe temperature and good luck,' he said, slapped the side of the aeroplane and walked away. I did as I was told and released the brakes . . . It was a thrill I shall never forget, as the aircraft accelerated down the runway . . . My immediate reaction was the lack of noise or vibration . . . The Meteor project was Top Secret and we were told not to fly out of the Moreton Valence area and avoid having to force-land anywhere else."

In the post-war period, it was used by Glosters for further testing of the Meteor, and was also used for final completion of Javelin fighters which were built in Brockworth and flown the short distance to Moreton Valence, the runway at Brockworth being too short to safely allow a completed Javelin to take off. The airfield site has been subsequently bisected by the M5 and some areas are used for industrial parks.

The following units were posted here:

- No. 3 (Pilots) Advanced Flying Unit RAF
- No. 6 Air Observers Navigation School RAF
- No. 6 Air Observers School RAF
- No. 6 (Observers) Advanced Flying Unit RAF
- No. 6 (Pilots) Advanced Flying Unit RAF
- No. 12 (RNZAF) Personnel Reception Centre
- No. 83 Gliding School RAF
- Pilot Refresher Training Unit
