= Bill Waterton =

Canadian and British test pilot, squadron leader and correspondent

- Born: William Arthur Waterton; 18 March 1916; Edmonton, Alberta, Canada
- Died: 17 April 2006 (aged 90); Owen Sound, Ontario, Canada
- Military career
- Allegiance: United Kingdom
- Branch: Royal Air Force
- Service years: 1939–46
- Rank: Squadron Leader
- Service number: 42288
- Unit: No. 242 Squadron RAF
- Awards: Air Force Cross & Bar; George Medal
- Other work: Test Pilot; Aviation correspondent

William Arthur Waterton, AFC & Bar, GM (18 March 1916 – 17 April 2006) was a Canadian and British test pilot, squadron leader and correspondent for the Daily Express. He was awarded the George Medal for saving the flight data when he landed at great risk the prototype Gloster Javelin after it lost its controls during a test flight.

== Early years ==
Born in Edmonton, Alberta, Canada in 1916, W. A. Waterton was brought up in Camrose, Alberta, where his father was chief of police. His family originally came from north Sydenham Township and settled in Owen Sound, Ontario. He was interested in flying from an early age. Like many aviators of his generation, he made his first flight when a barnstormer visited Camrose in 1931.

== Aviation career ==
=== Second World War ===
Entering the Royal Military College of Canada in 1935, after two years at the school, where he was a champion middleweight boxer, Waterton had applied without success to the Royal Canadian Air Force (RCAF) and Canadian Army in 1938. Ultimately, he was accepted on a short service commission for the Royal Air Force (RAF) which was expanding rapidly in expectation of war. In Britain, he took flying lessons and joined the RAF on 10 June 1939. He was first posted to No. 242 Squadron RAF and flew Hawker Hurricanes from Biggin Hill and Manston during the Battle of France. In operations over Dunkirk on 25 May 1940, he crashed near Dover and suffered severe head injuries. When Waterton returned to flying duties, he was sent to No. 6 Operational Training Unit. His skills as an instructor were recognised and he was made a flying instructor, training hundreds of pilots for over two years in both the UK and Canada.

=== Test flying ===
After a stint with Transatlantic Ferry Command in 1943, and initially posted to No. 124 Squadron in September 1943, he was transferred to 1409 (Meteorological) Flight. In 1944, Waterton applied to the Air Fighting Development Unit based at Wittering in Lincolnshire which assessed captured enemy aircraft by flying them in mock combat against the greatest variety of Allied aircraft. During this period, he amassed a great deal of test flying in devising tactics for Fighter Command based on the actual performance of aircraft in "real life" conditions. Along with other colleagues, Waterton was sent to No. 5 Empire Test Pilots' School (ETPS) at Hanworth, Middlesex.

=== Postwar ===
After the war when Waterton was at the Central Fighter Establishment, he was selected for the High Speed Flight, preparing for an attempt at the world airspeed record with the RAF's first jet fighter, the Gloster Meteor. He achieved an average speed of 614 mph with Meteor IV EE550, only two mph less than that of the team leader E. M. Donaldson who established a new record with EE549 on 7 September 1946.

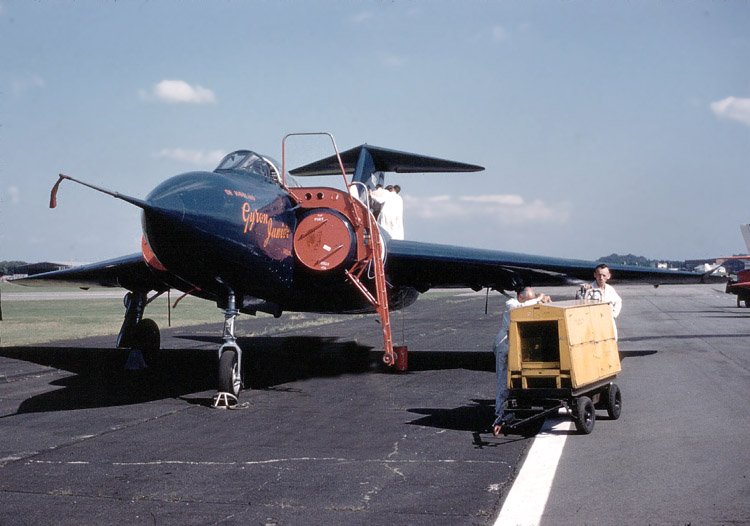
Gloster GA.5 Javelin flight test prototype at Farnborough

=== Gloster Aircraft Company ===
Following the high speed flights, Waterton joined the Gloster Aircraft Company in September 1946 as a development test pilot. He became the company's Chief Test Pilot, primarily in charge of experimental flight testing their new designs, the Meteor family, the experimental Gloster E.1/44, and the delta-wing Gloster GA.5 which entered service as the Gloster Javelin. He also was involved in acceptance test flying on production aircraft.

On 6 February 1948, Waterton set the world 100 kilometres closed circuit air speed record flying a Gloster Meteor IV at 524.95 mph, although his record was broken a few weeks later by Mike Lithgow in a Supermarine Attacker.

In 1950, Waterton was loaned to Avro Canada for the test flights of the Avro CF-100 Canuck because as a Canadian by birth, and as an experienced test pilot, (Note: At the time, Waterton had more flight testing time in jet fighters than any other pilot.) it was considered a public relations triumph for the parent Hawker Siddeley Group. On 19 January 1950, he piloted the CF-100 prototype on its maiden flight, and stayed on as the aircraft proceeded through its company development trials and throughout a United States Air Force "fly-off" competition in May 1950.

On his return to Gloster in 1951, Waterton found that he was continually at odds with management and even though he continued test flying, gave his superiors an ultimatum to address deficiencies in the Javelin fighter, that ended with his discharge in 1954. (Note: Initially, Waterton claimed that he resigned.)

=== Aviation correspondent ===
Following his dismissal from Gloster, Waterton became an aviation correspondent for the Daily Express; his columns fearlessly criticising British aviation and its aircraft. In 1955, he collaborated with Daily Express sub-editor Timothy Hewat on The Comet Riddle, a book covering the de Havilland Comet crashes.

The following year, Waterton published his autobiography The Quick and the Dead in which he accused the British aviation industry of being badly run, aiming for a quick profit and lagging behind the Soviet and US industry. Due to advertiser pressure, Waterton was fired by the Daily Express, and his departure was covered on their own front page: "We Sacked Waterton – and Why".

=== Later years ===
Thereafter, Waterton moved back to Canada to his hometown of Owen Sound, Ontario and largely led a life out of the public eye. During his later years, he continued to fly as an instructor and taught Eddie Sargent, the colourful and popular Owen Sound mayor, member of provincial parliament, newspaper publisher, promoter and record-holding swimmer, to fly. Waterton died in 2006, and was buried in Oxenden cemetery; his final wish was to be buried with water close by, and even closer is the end of the runway of the nearby Wiarton Airport, Wiarton, Ontario.

== Honours and awards ==
- 1 January 1943 – Flight Lieutenant William Arthur Waterton (RAF 42288), Royal Air Force is awarded the Air Force Cross (AFC)
- 12 June 1947 – Acting Squadron Leader William Arthur Waterton AFC (42288) RAFO is awarded a bar to his Air Force Cross (AFC)
- 25 July 1952 – William Arthur Waterton AFC, Chief Test Pilot, Gloster Aircraft Company is awarded the George Medal:

Chief Test Pilot Waterton was making a test flight in a prototype jet all-purpose fighter and, whilst travelling at high speed at the height of about 3,000 feet, elevator flutter developed and both elevators became detached from the aircraft. This left the pilot with practically no control of his aircraft in pitch. Waterton climbed the aircraft to 10,000 feet and experimented with what was left of the control, the paramount factor in effecting a safe landing. He found that it was possible to retain some control down to a speed roughly half as fast again as the normal landing speed. Knowing that a crash would put back seriously the development and production he decided to land the aircraft despite having at his command an ejector seat and parachute. He landed the machine heavily owing to the lack of control and the undercarriage gave way. After the crashed aircraft came to rest, fire broke out and Waterton found great difficulty in freeing himself owing to a jammed "hood. Eventually he did get out of the wreck. By then the flames had reached the area of the cockpit but despite this, he climbed back into the fuselage and salvaged the automatic records relating to the original aerodynamic and structural failures. The behaviour of Chief Test Pilot Waterton was exemplary and beyond the call of duty and his courage was outstanding.

— London Gazette

In 2003, Waterton was made an associate member of the Empire Test Pilots' School Association. Although covering a broad overview of the aerospace industry in the 1950s and 1960s, James Hamilton-Paterson exhaustively profiled Waterton's career in the recent, Empire of the Clouds: When Britain's Aircraft Ruled the World (2010).
