= Droopsnoot =

The term droopsnoot or droop snoot has been variously applied to the following:

- Droop nose (aeronautics), including:
  - The variable-angled nose of Concorde
  - The variable-angled front section of the Fairey Delta 2
- The Lockheed P-38 Lightning (J variant)
- The High Performance model of the Vauxhall Firenza automobile
