= FD2 (disambiguation) =

FD2 most often refers to Final Destination 2, a 2003 American supernatural horror film directed by David R. Ellis.

FD2 may also refer to:

- FD2 (car)
- Fairey Delta 2, an experimental aircraft
- Alex Caulder, a fictional character
