= Peter Twiss =

British test pilot (1921–2011)

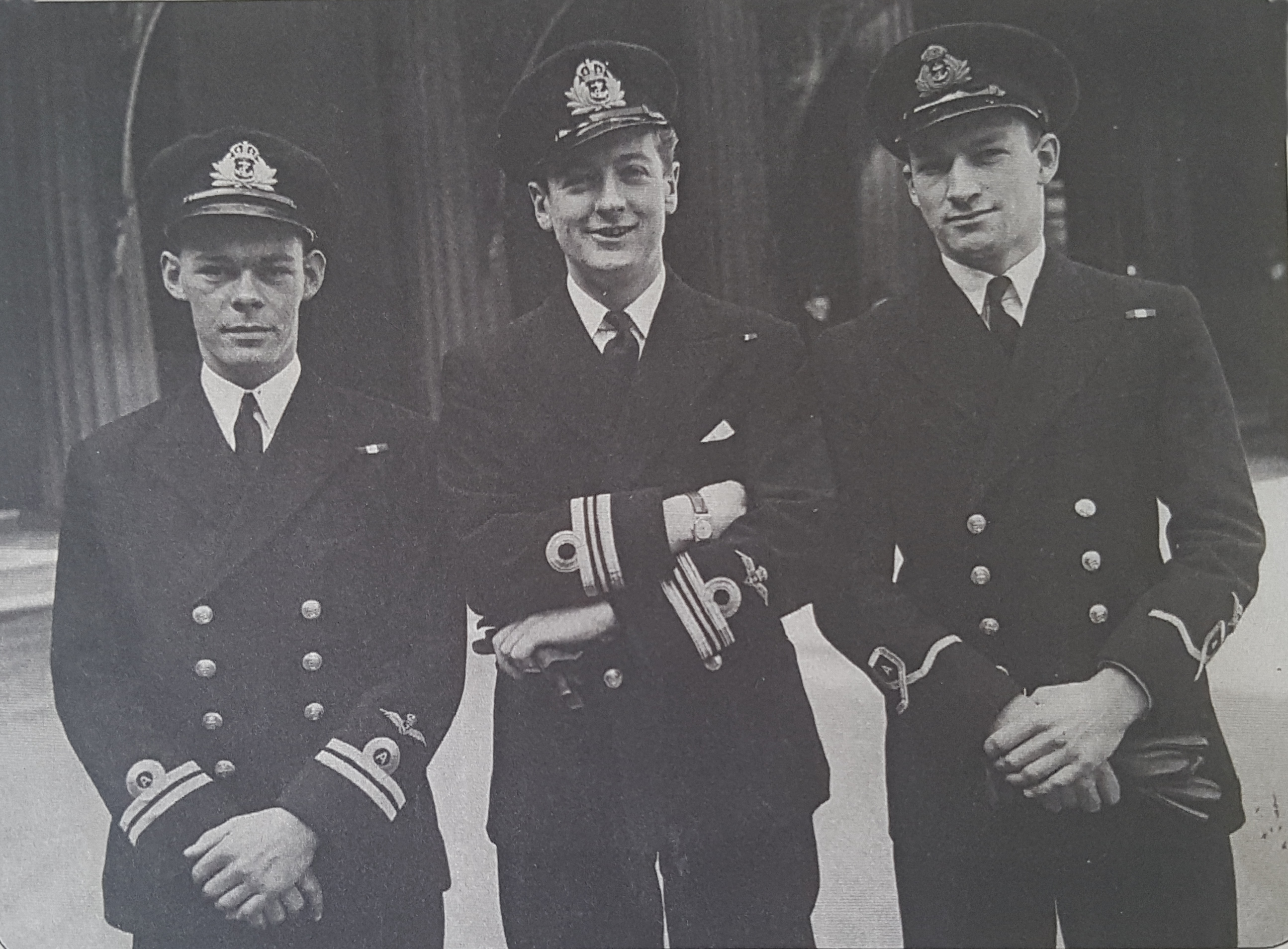
- Twiss (Right) at Buckingham Palace during Investiture, 6 April 1943
- Born: Lionel Peter Twiss; 23 July 1921; Lindfield, West Sussex, England
- Died: 31 August 2011 (aged 90)
- Known for: Breaking the World Air Speed Record and being the first person to exceed 1,000 mph (1,600 km/h; 870 kn) in flight
- Awards: Distinguished Service Cross (1942) & Bar (1943); Queen's Commendation for Valuable Service in the Air (1955); Britannia Trophy (1956); Segrave Trophy (1956); Officer of the Order of the British Empire (1957)
- Aviation career
- Air force: Fleet Air Arm
- Battles: Second World War: Malta Convoys; Operation Torch
- Rank: Lieutenant Commander

Lionel Peter Twiss OBE, DSC & Bar (23 July 1921 – 31 August 2011) was a British test pilot who held the World Air Speed Record in 1956.

== Early life ==
He was born in Lindfield, Sussex and lived with his grandmother while his parents were in India and Burma. He was the grandson of an admiral and the son of Colonel Dudley Cyril Twiss an army officer. Twiss went to school at Haywards Heath and later at Sherborne School. In 1938, he was employed as an apprentice tea-taster by Brooke Bond in London, before returning to the family farm near Salisbury.

== Aviation career ==
=== Military ===
Rejected as a pilot by the Fleet Air Arm, he was accepted as a Naval Airman Second Class on the outbreak of the Second World War. After training at 14 Elementary and Reserve Flying Training School, Castle Bromwich, he went on to fly Fairey Battles and Hawker Harts. He underwent operational training at RNAS Yeovilton flying Blackburn Rocs, Blackburn Skuas and Gloster Gladiators. His next posting was at the School of Army Co-operation at Andover, flying Bristol Blenheims as a twin conversion. He was then posted to 771 Squadron in the Orkney Islands, flying a variety of naval aircraft on various duties, including met observations at 12000 ft in winter in the open cockpit of a Fairey Swordfish, and target-towing duties.

He then served with the Merchant Ship Fighter Unit on catapult ships flying Hawker Hurricanes. These missions required the pilot to ditch or bale out, in the expectation of being recovered by a passing ship. During the Malta Convoys in 1942, he flew Fairey Fulmars with 807 Squadron, from the carrier HMS Argus. For his service, he was awarded the Distinguished Service Cross (DSC) in June 1942. Later in the year, the squadron converted to Supermarine Seafires flying from HMS Furious for the Operation Torch landings in North Africa. During the Allied landings in Algeria and Morocco, he added a bar to his DSC, gazetted in March 1943. By this time, he had shot down one Italian aircraft (a Fiat CR.42 on 14 May 1942) and damaged another.

He then flew long-range intruder operations over Germany from RNAS Ford, developing night fighter tactics with the RAF's Fighter Interception Unit. Ford also acted as an operational research unit and so Twiss flew missions over occupied Europe, in Bristol Beaufighters and de Havilland Mosquitos, so putting the unit's theory into practice. He claimed two Junkers Ju 88s shot down during 1944.

Later in 1944, he was sent to the British Air Commission Washington DC, where he tested various prototype aircraft and evaluated airborne radar equipment. He also served at the Naval Air Station Patuxent River, Maryland. By the end of the war, he was a lieutenant commander. In 1945, he attended No. 3 Course at the Empire Test Pilots' School (ETPS), then based at RAF Cranfield. and then went to the Naval Squadron at the Aeroplane and Armament Experimental Establishment at Boscombe Down.

=== Civil ===
In 1946, Twiss joined Fairey Aviation as a test pilot and flew many of the company's aircraft, including the Fairey Primer, Fairey Gannet, Fairey Firefly, Fairey Delta 1 and the Fairey Rotodyne compound-helicopter. In 1947, he entered the Lympne Air Races flying a Firefly IV, winning the high-speed race at 305.93 mph. He worked for two years on the Fairey Delta 2, a supersonic delta-winged research plane. On 17 November 1954, the FD2 suffered engine failure and consequently hydraulic power loss on a test flight, but Twiss managed to crash-land at Boscombe Down. He received the Queen's Commendation for Valuable Service in the Air for this feat. The aircraft was repaired and, flying it on 10 March 1956, Twiss broke the World Speed Record, raising it to 1,132 mph (1811 km/h), an increase of some 300 mph (480 km/h) over the record set the year before by an F-100 Super Sabre, and became the first jet aircraft to exceed 1,000 mph in level flight.

== Later career ==
In 1960, Fairey Aviation was sold to Westland Aircraft, a helicopter manufacturer, which was not Twiss's area of expertise. Twiss left after a career in which he had piloted more than 140 different types of aircraft. Twiss joined Fairey Marine in 1960 and was responsible for the development and sales of day-cruisers. He appeared in the film From Russia with Love, driving one of the company's speedboats. His work as a marine consultant led to directorships of Fairey Marine (1968–78) and Hamble Point Marina (1978–88).

In 1969, driving the Fairey Huntsman 707 Fordsport, he took part in the Round Britain Powerboat Race, including among his crew Rally champion Roger Clark. He also appeared in the film Sink the Bismarck, in which he flew a Fairey Swordfish. Twiss was for several years a member of Lasham Gliding Society. His autobiography Faster Than the Sun was published in 1963, and revised in 2005.

== Personal life ==
Twiss was married five times. His first three marriages, to Constance Tomkinson, Vera Maguire and Cherry Huggins, ended in divorce. His fourth wife, Heather Danby, predeceased him in 1988. When Twiss died on 31 August 2011, he was survived by his fifth wife, Jane de Lucey. Twiss had a son, three daughters and several stepchildren.

== Bibliography ==
- Taylor, H. A. Fairey Aircraft since 1915. London: Putnam, 1974. ISBN 0-370-00065-X.
- Winchester, Jim. Concept Aircraft: Prototypes, X-Planes and Experimental Aircraft. Rochester, Kent, UK: Grange books plc, 2005. ISBN 1-84013-809-2.
- Twiss, Peter. Faster than the Sun. London: Grub Street Publishing, 2000. ISBN 1-902304-43-8.
- "The Empire Test Pilots' School – Twenty Five Years". ETPS Brochure (4th Ed.). HMSO for The Empire Test Pilots' School: 68 pp. 1968.
