= Donald Stokes, Baron Stokes =

English engineer, industrialist, army officer and nobleman

Lieutenant-Colonel The Right Honourable The Lord Stokes TD
- Born: Donald Gresham Stokes; 22 March 1914; Plymouth, Devon, England
- Died: 21 July 2008 (aged 94)
- Education: Harris Institute of Technology
- Occupations: Head of British Leyland Motor Corporation, 1968–1975
- Title: President of the Institution of Mechanical Engineers
- Term: 1972
- Predecessor: Robert Lang Lickley
- Successor: John William Atwell
- Spouse: Laura Elizabeth Courteney Lamb (1914–1995)
- Parent(s): Harry Potts Stokes; Mary Elizabeth Gresham Yates/Stokes
- Awards: Commander of the Order of Leopold II

Member of the House of Lords
- Lord Temporal
- Life peerage 9 January 1969 – 21 July 2008

Donald Gresham Stokes, Baron Stokes TD (22 March 1914 – 21 July 2008) was an English industrialist. He was the managing director of Leyland Motors from 1962 to 1968 and the chief executive of its successor British Leyland from 1968 to 1975.

== Life and career ==
Stokes was born in Plymouth, and educated at Blundell's School in Tiverton, Devon. In 1930 he commenced an engineering apprenticeship with Leyland Motors, which included further education at the Harris Institute of Technology in Preston. During the Second World War, Stokes served with the Royal Electrical and Mechanical Engineers, reaching the rank of lieutenant-colonel. In the early summer of 1939 he married Laura Elizabeth Courteney Lamb. Excepting the break for military service between 1939 and 1945, Stokes stayed with Leyland throughout his career, although he also served in the Territorial Army. In 1968 he was appointed chairman and managing director of British Leyland, a challenging role much in the public eye at the time.

In 1977 Michael Edwardes was appointed chief executive at British Leyland, but Stokes remained on the board till 1979.

Stokes was awarded with a knighthood in the 1965 Birthday Honours, having the honour conferred by The Queen on 11 November. He was created a Life Peer taking the title Baron Stokes, of Leyland in the County Palatine of Lancaster on 9 January 1969 and sat as a Crossbencher in the House of Lords. By the time he died he had become the second eldest member.

On 13 June 1972 Stokes was made a Commandre de l'Ordre de Leopold II in recognition of his services to the Belgian economy. The ceremony took place at Seneffe (between Brussels and Mons) where a new extension to the British Leyland plant was being inaugurated.

Lord Stokes died on 21 July 2008, aged 94.

== British Leyland under Stokes ==
Stokes was essentially a salesman, and he successfully led Leyland Motor Corporation in the period up to 1968. During this time he was immensely successful in developing export sales and establishing overseas subsidiaries. This established his stature as a captain of industry especially in the eyes of prime minister Harold Wilson. Wilson encouraged him to merge Leyland with BMC however he never really got to grips with the scale and politics of British Leyland, which had now incorporated BMC, Rover, Jaguar and related commercial vehicle marques with nearly 40 factories and over 100 business units.

His efforts to bring in senior executives from competitors were only partially successful, and persistent infighting (such as the discrimination against MG in allocating investment funding in favour of Triumph) whilst the inherent unprofitability of BMC sapped the competitive position of the new business. Meanwhile, Leyland Motor Corporation's new engine policy of the late 1960s had failed, with the AEC V8 and the Rover Gas Turbine being dropped by 1973 and the Leyland 500 series fixed head engine confined to lower-powered, mainly bus applications before being dropped in 1979; the thirst of the gas turbine and the unreliability of the V8 (which had been rushed to market as an under-developed unit) and the 500-series cost sales and enabled Scania and Volvo to enter the UK market.

Both before and during his period of leadership, the British motor industry suffered from poor profitability, which went hand in hand with chronic lack of investment in production technologies and facilities. In 1975, towards the end of Stokes' time at the helm of the company, a journalist compared the published number of employees and the published number of cars produced by various automakers, Toyota produced 36 cars per employee while Honda produced nearly 23: BLMC produced slightly more than four cars per employee in 1975 as against more than 7 for Ford's UK plants. Factors such as the variable extent of dependence on brought-in sub-assemblies made the comparison imperfect, but the continuing lack of profitability resulting from continuing failure to invest intelligently in up to date production processes was all too real. This was a part of the background to BL's famously awful industrial relations during the 1970s. Characteristic BL introductions included the Morris Marina and Austin Allegro inspired respectively by the more thoughtfully developed and charismatic Ford Cortina and Citroën GS competitor products.

== Arms ==
Coat of arms of Donald Stokes, Baron Stokes

Crest
A demi-lion doubled queued Ermine holding between the paws a piston with connecting rod Argent the crown inflamed Proper.
Escutcheon
Gyronny of eight Or and Sable a lion rampant double queued Ermine on a chief Or an estoc erect between two speedwell flowers stalked and leaved Proper.
Supporters
Dexter a lion reguardant double queued Ermine sinister a horse Argent crined and unguled Sable.
Motto
Speed Well

== External links and sources ==
- Obituary in The Times
- Obituary in The Guardian
- UK Parliamentary Biographies

Professional and academic associations
Preceded by Robert Lang Lickley	President of the Institution of Mechanical Engineers; 1972	Succeeded by Sir John William Atwell
