= Sukhoi T-4 =

Four-engine aircraft from the USSR

T-4
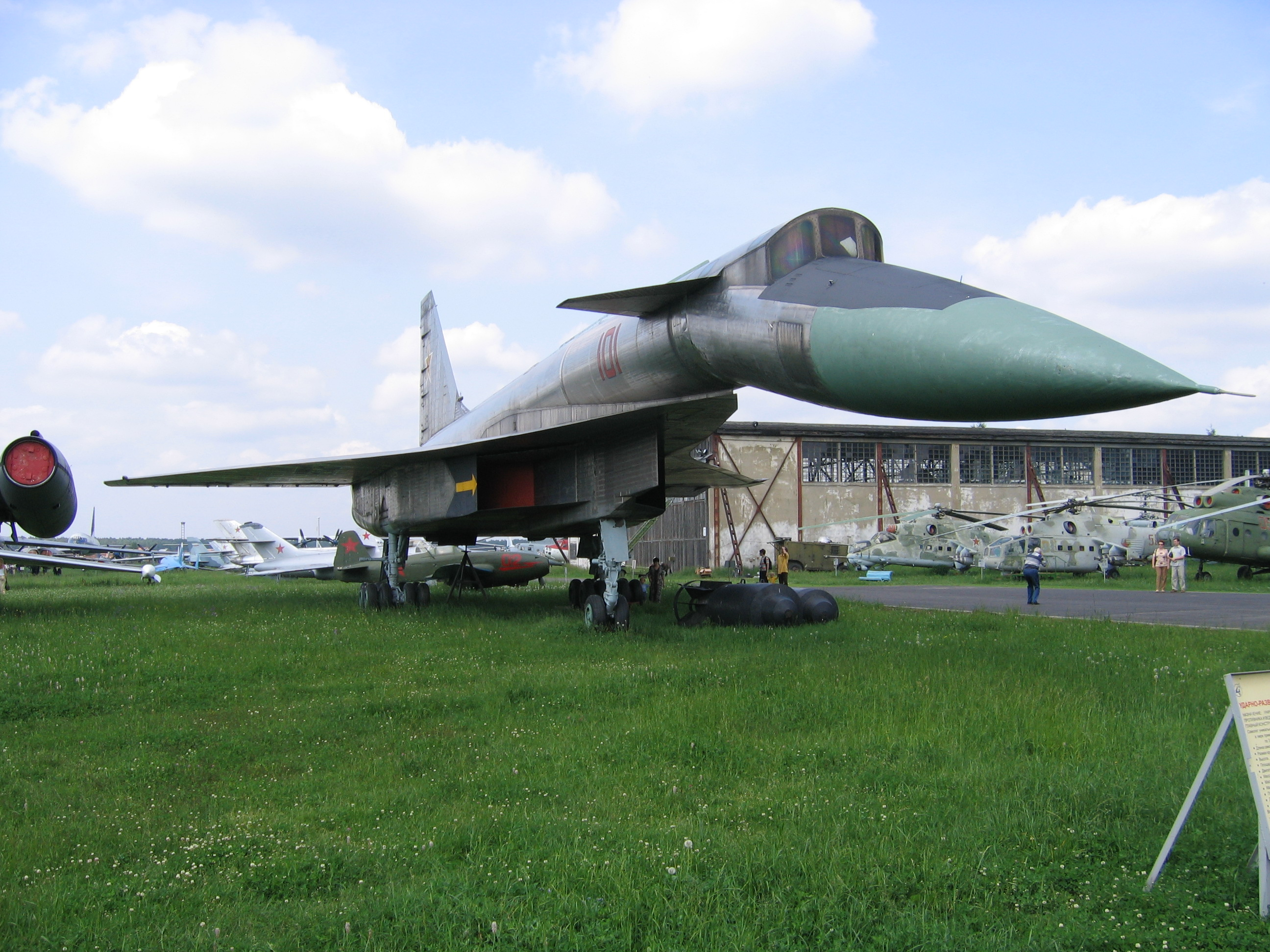
- Sukhoi Т-4 at Central Air Force Museum

General information
- Type: Strategic bomber/Reconnaissance
- Manufacturer: Sukhoi
- Status: project cancelled
- Primary user: Soviet Air Force
- Number built: 4 (only 1 passed test flights)

History
- First flight: 22 August 1972

The Sukhoi T-4, also known as "Aircraft 100", "Project 100", or "Sotka" is a Soviet high-speed reconnaissance, anti-ship and strategic bomber aircraft that did not proceed beyond the prototype stage. It is sometimes called the Su-100.

== Design and development ==
In 1963, the Soviet government held a request for proposal among the aircraft design bureaus. The Sukhoi design, with its high cruise speed of 3,200 km/h (2,000 mph) was favored over the designs submitted by Yakovlev and Tupolev and after a preliminary design review in June 1964, the building of a prototype was authorized. Development of the T-4 required massive research efforts to develop the technologies necessary, including the manufacturing technologies to machine and weld the materials necessary to withstand sustained Mach 3 flight. Nearly 600 patents or inventions are attributed to the program. The first flying prototype was finally completed in the autumn of 1971. Work continued on an additional three airframes (one for static testing) through 1975. In 1974, the Ministry of Aviation Industry (Soviet Union) ordered work suspended on the T-4 project, which was officially scrapped on 19 December 1975.

The aircraft's droop nose lowered to provide visibility during takeoff and landing. A periscope was used for forward viewing when the nose was retracted, and could be employed at speeds of up to 600 km/h (370 mph). Drogue parachutes were used in addition to conventional wheel brakes.

== Operational history ==
The first T-4, designated "101", first flew on 22 August 1972. The test pilot was Vladimir Ilyushin, son of famed aircraft designer Sergei Ilyushin, and the navigator was Nikolai Alfyorov. Testing continued to 19 January 1974. The T-4 flew only ten times for a total of 10 hours and 20 minutes..

== Aircraft on display ==
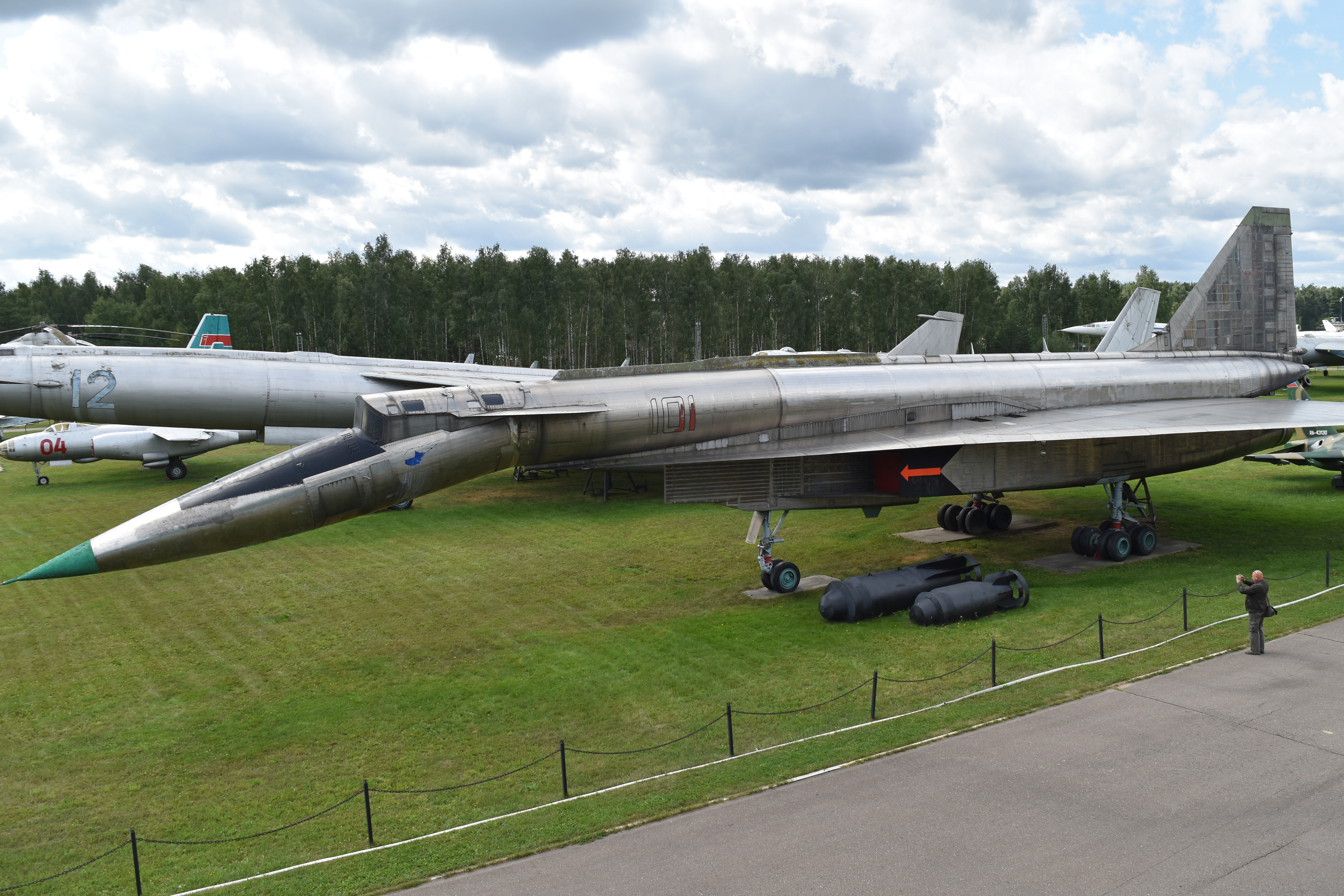
Aircraft "101" at Central Air Force Museum

One T-4 survives. Aircraft "101" is on display at the Central Air Force Museum in Monino near Moscow. The serial numbers of the prototypes were "101" to "106". Only "101" and "102" were built, while other additional prototypes "103" and "104" were under construction, and "105" and "106" only existed on draft charts. Only the "101" completed all the test flights and flew the last test flight before the project was cancelled on 22 January 1974. The rest of the prototypes were scrapped.

== Specifications ==
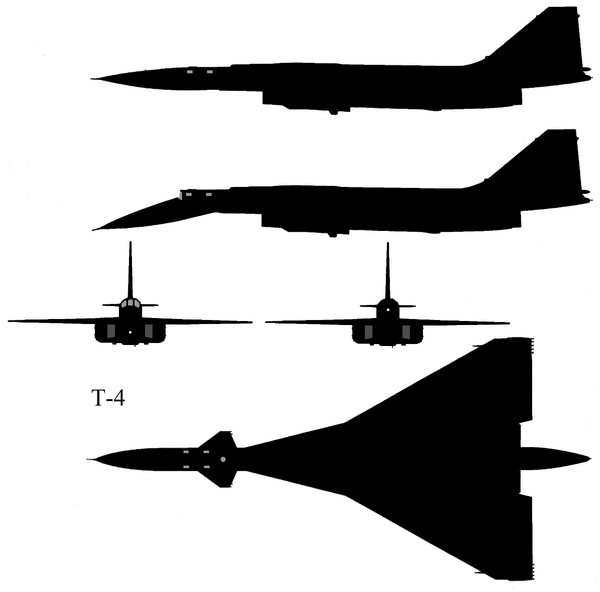
T-4

Data from

General characteristics

- Crew: 2
- Length: 44 m (144 ft 4 in)
- Wingspan: 22 m (72 ft 2 in)
- Height: 11.2 m (36 ft 9 in)
- Wing area: 295.7 m^{2} (3,183 sq ft)
- Empty weight: 55,600 kg (122,577 lb)
- Gross weight: 114,000 kg (251,327 lb)
- Max takeoff weight: 135,000 kg (297,624 lb)
- Powerplant: 4 × Kolesov RD-36-41 afterburning turbojet engines, 157 kN (35,000 lbf) with afterburner

Performance

- Maximum speed: 3,200 km/h (2,000 mph, 1,700 kn)
- Maximum speed: Mach 3 (design), 1.3 (achieved)
- Cruise speed: 3,000 km/h (1,900 mph, 1,600 kn) / M2.8
- Ferry range: 7,000 km (4,300 mi, 3,800 nmi)
- Service ceiling: 20,000–24,000 m (66,000–79,000 ft)

== See also ==
Aircraft of comparable role, configuration, and era

- Avro 730
- North American XB-70 Valkyrie

Related lists

- List of bomber aircraft
- List of military aircraft of the Soviet Union and the CIS
