= Robert Lickley =

Scottish aeronautical engineer

Sir Robert Lickley
- Bob Lickley
- Born: 19 January 1912; Dundee, Scotland
- Died: 7 July 1998 (aged 86); Surrey
- Citizenship: British
- Education: University of Edinburgh, Imperial College London
- Spouse: Doris May
- Children: 1 son, 1 daughter
- Engineering career
- Discipline: Aeronautics
- Institutions: Institution of Engineering Designers, Royal Aeronautical Society, Institution of Mechanical Engineers
- Employer(s): Hawker, Fairey
- Significant design: Hawker Hurricane
- Significant advance: Fairey Delta 2
- Awards: Gold Medal, RAeS (1957), Taylor Gold Medal, RAeS (1958)

Sir Robert Lang Lickley CBE FRSE FREng FRAeS FIEE (19 January 1912 – 7 July 1998) was a Scottish aeronautical engineer, and Chief Engineer at Fairey Aviation during whose tenure the Fairey Delta 2 became the first aircraft to exceed 1,000 mph.

== Early life ==
His father was Robert Lickley, and lived on King Street. His father ran A. & R. Lickley estate agents, at 30 Reform Street then 2a King Street from 1911, which was founded by his grandfather Alexander T Lickley, born in Dundee in 1842. His grandfather started an apprenticeship at the age of nine. His father was chairman of the Dundee Auxiliary Section of the London Missionary Society, and chairman of the Dundee Liberal Association, and part of the Dundee and District Amateur Gymnastics Society. His father died in early December 1925; he had been ill for years.

His mother, Elizabeth L Lickley, moved to 53 Old Glamis Road. His mother Elizabeth died, aged 93, on 18 February 1967. She died at her daughter's house, on Beverley Close in Camberley, in north-east Surrey.

Lickley was born in Dundee in Scotland and was educated at the High School of Dundee. He studied Civil Engineering at the University of Edinburgh where he graduated BSc, and then went on to Imperial College London as a postgraduate, where he studied Aeronautics on a Caird Scholarship.

His sister, Isobel, married Petty Officer L Benbow, from Leicester, at Panmure Street Congregational Church on Saturday 14 August 1943. His sister was a naval nurse, in the Voluntary Aid Detachment.

== Career ==
=== Hawker ===
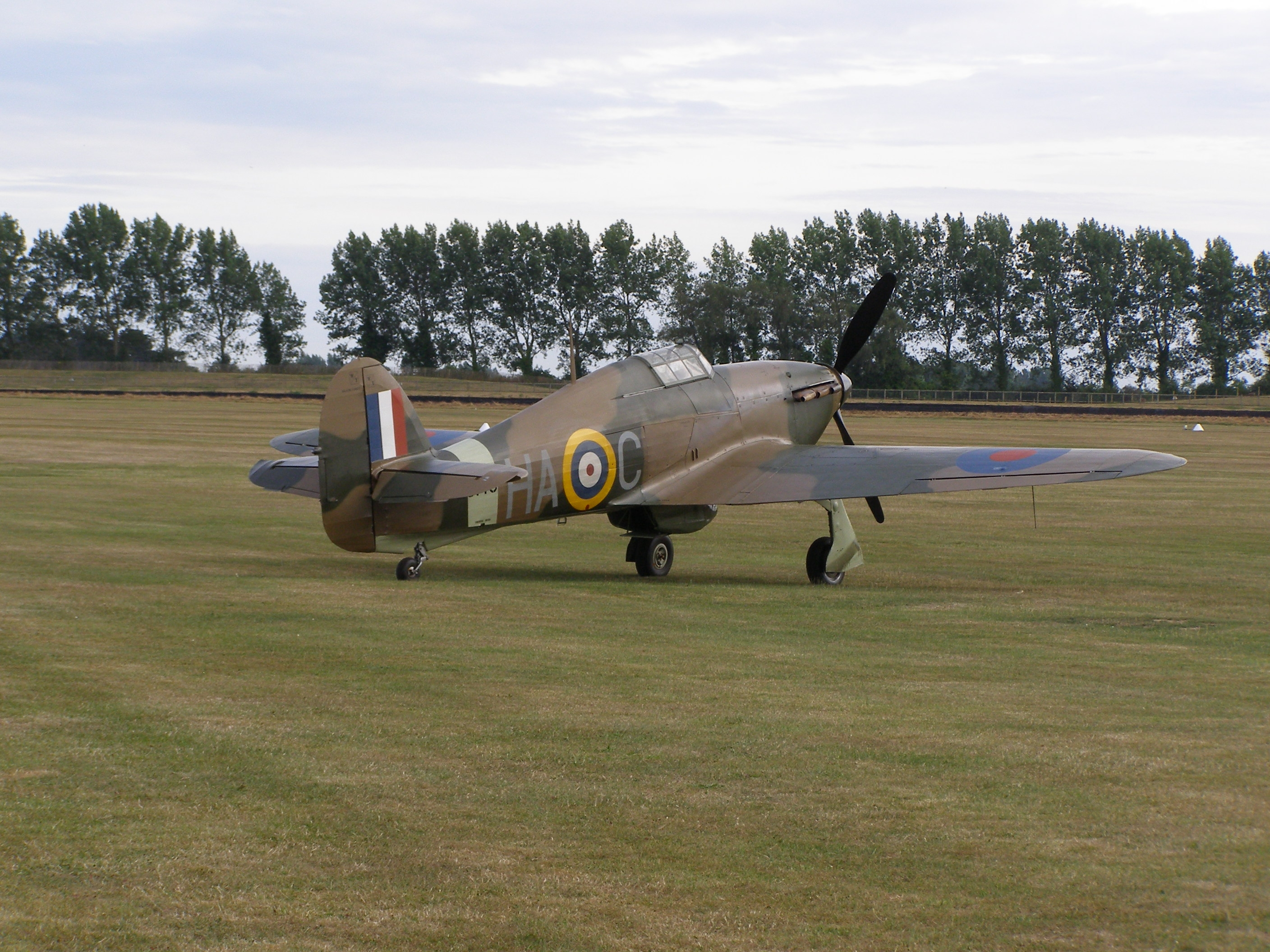
Hawker Hurricane

Lickley joined the stress office of Hawker at Kingston upon Thames in 1933. He worked on a new single-seat eight-gun monoplane for specification F5/34. This became the Hawker Hurricane, which first flew in 1935.

As a Chief Project Engineer he worked on the Typhoon, Tempest, and Sea Fury. He worked on Hawker's entry into jet flight, the P.1040, which became the Sea Hawk.

=== Cranfield ===
He became Professor of Aircraft Design in 1946 at the new College of Aeronautics at Cranfield, which became Cranfield University.

=== Fairey ===
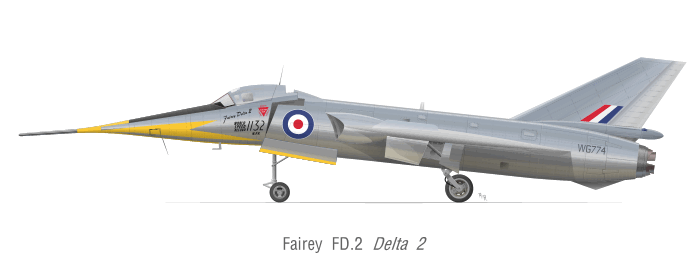
Fairey Delta 2

In November 1951 Lickley became Chief Engineer of Fairey Aviation and became Technical Director in November 1956.

He initially worked on the Fairey Gannet, including the AEW version. He put together a team of aerodynamicists and mathematicians at their headquarters at Hayes in Middlesex. Fairey was also based in northern Cheshire.

At the same time the Fairey Rotodyne compound gyroplane was being developed, although ultimately cancelled in 1962. The military version would have cost too much and BEA considered the commercial prospects to be not sufficiently assured. The 48-seat aircraft had been planned for the London-Paris route. Fairey also developed the Fairey Ultra-light Helicopter for the Royal Navy, but it was not adopted. The company developed the Fireflash, the UK's first air-to-air missile, at its site at Heston. The total engineering team and staff at Hayes was around 1,000. Lickley later became Managing Director. Part of the company also helped to build the Trawsfynydd nuclear power station.

The British Conservative government cancelled Fairey's new fighter, based on the FD2. A Fairey Delta 3 had also been planned. The French, however, saw the development potential for the FD2 concept, and their Dassault Mirage aircraft would be produced in many variants and exported to many countries. The FD2 had a drooped nose (10 degrees) which included the cockpit. A simpler droop nose, in so far as it was only the unpressurized part in front of the cockpit, was later developed for Concorde.

He left Fairey in March 1960, when Westland bought the company. The Lickley Centre, of Fairey Hydraulics, opened in June 1982.

=== Hawker Siddeley ===
He became deputy managing director of Hawker Siddeley on 16 May 1960, under managing director J T Lidbury. He became the head of the Hawker Siddeley military aviation division in April 1965.

He oversaw the introduction of the Harrier.

=== Institutions ===
In the 1950s Lickley was a member of the Aeronautical Research Council and Society of British Aerospace Companies. He received an Honorary Doctorate of Science from the University of Edinburgh in 1973 and from the University of Strathclyde in January 1987. He worked with the Science and Engineering Research Council (SERC).

He became a Fellow of the RAeS in 1943. In October 1982 became an honorary fellow of the IMechE. He gave a talk to the local Derby RAeS section on 12 November 1985.

In 1977 he was elected a Fellow of the Royal Society of Edinburgh. His proposers were Donald McCallum, Sir John Atwell, Francis Penny and Thomas Diery Patten.

On 25 November 1981, speaking as President of the Institution of Production Engineers, he said the Government appears to have developed a smooth transfer line which moves the oil revenues to the unemployed without any intervening checks or delays. Instead the checks and delays exist, it would seem, to restrain industry from becoming more efficient and to reduce the likelihood of more young people moving into engineering. At the time his words were echoed by Robert Inskip, 2nd Viscount Caldecote.

== Personal life ==
Lickley married Doris May Godby (d.1997) from south-west London, on June 28 1941 at St Columba's Church, Pont Street. They had a son and a daughter, and lived in Walton-on-Thames at 'Foxwood'.

He was created a Commander of the Order of the British Empire (CBE) in the 1973 Birthday Honours and was knighted in the 1984 Birthday Honours.

He died at St Peter's Hospital, Chertsey.

Preceded by	President of the Institution of Mechanical Engineers; 1971–72	Succeeded by
Preceded by	President of the Institution of Production Engineers; 1981–82	Succeeded by
