= Constance Tomkinson =

English writer (1915–1995)

- Constance Tomkinson, from a photograph by Lettice Ramsey
- Born: Constance Avard Tomkinson; 15 June 1915; Canso, Nova Scotia, Canada
- Died: 23 December 1995 (aged 80); Chichester, West Sussex, UK
- Occupation: Writer
- Spouse: Sir Hugh Thomas Weeks

Constance Tomkinson (15 June 1915 – 23 December 1995) was a Canadian writer and stage actress.

== Life ==
Tomkinson was the first of two daughters born to Harold Tomkinson and Grace Avard Tomkinson. Harold was a minister who was ordained in the Presbyterian Church of Canada and went on to serve in the Congregationalist Church, and the United Church of Canada. Grace Tomkinson was a writer whose first novel, Her Own People (1945) was nominated for the Governor General's Award. Constance graduated from the Yarmouth Academy in 1933.

== Career ==
Contrary to prevailing mores that viewed the theater as "wicked and no fit place for anyone's daughter," Tomkinson's parents supported her ambitions and financed her first excursion when she traveled to New York City in 1934 to study at the Neighborhood Playhouse School of the Theatre. She debuted on Broadway the following year in the Edward Woolf play, Libel!. After struggling to get other parts, she decided to move to England, again with her family's support.

As she recounts in Les Girls (1956), she had no better luck in the English theater, often turned away because of her Canadian accent, and so she applied for a place as one of the eight Millerettes, a singing and dancing chorus troupe managed by Trixie Miller and her husband. After the troupe was stranded without work in Gothenburg, Tomkinson and several of her fellow dancers traveled to Paris. She landed a place in the chorus of the Folies Bergère, where she worked with Josephine Baker. She then took a job with the English troupe, The Basil Beauties, managed by Reginald Basil, with whom she toured in Germany, The Netherlands, and Italy. Still hoping to break into the theater, she left the troupe on its return to London.

Her second book, African Follies (1959), relates what happened next. She made the acquaintance of a retired sweets manufacturer she refers to as "Mr. Doe" who was looking for a secretary to accompany him on a trip to Africa, where he intended to "take a look around." "Availability was my chief qualification for the post," she wrote. Following their return to England, she returned to New York City to try her luck in the theater again. However, when she arrived there, she met Albert Batchelor, a cousin of her mother's, who had set himself on taking a trip around the world by airplane. He invited Constance to come along and she happily accepted. They departed by Pan Am Clipper on 22 August 1939, and though their plans were disrupted by the outbreak of World War II, they managed to return to the U.S. on 9 November 1939.

Tomkinson then performed with several traveling theater troupes, including the Manhattan Players and the Broadway Players. In 1941, she went to work for the British Ministry of Supply Mission in New York, where she met Peter Twiss, a decorated Royal Navy pilot then serving as a test pilot for the British Air Commission. They married in New York City on 30 October 1944 but divorced soon after the end of the war.

She returned to England in 1946 and worked as the secretary to Ninette de Valois, director of the Sadler's Wells Ballet Company from 1946 to 1948 and accompanied it on a tour of Eastern Europe, an experience she recounted in Dancing Attendance (1967). She married Hugh Weeks, then Joint Controller of the Colonial Development Corporation. About the same time, she became an assistant to Tyrone Guthrie, then director of The Old Vic Theatre, for whom she worked until 1952. She had been writing plays for years without ever interesting a producer. When she mustered the nerve to show Guthrie one of her manuscripts, he told her, "You must leave the theatre right away and write. You're just wasting your time here."

She started writing the book soon after the birth of her daughter, Jane, in 1954. "I sat in the attic for days before I could put a word on paper, but finally I started and nothing could stop me," she told reporter Sylvia Hack. Several chapters of her first book, Les Girls, about her experiences as a chorus girl in Europe, appeared in The Atlantic in 1955, attracting the interest of film producer Sol C. Siegel, who purchased the film rights months ahead of the book's publication. Although Tomkinson's identity as the author was revealed by Variety, a dispute over changes in the script soon led to a break and no mention of Tomkinson appears in the 1957 film version.

Les Girls was published by Little, Brown and Company in the U.S. and Michael Joseph in England, but her subsequent books were only published in England. After Michael Joseph rejected a fifth book, Tomkinson ended her writing career and focused on supporting her husband, by then chairman of the board of Leopold Joseph and Sons, a merchant bank.

She died in 1995.

== Works ==
- Les Girls, 1956
- African Follies, 1959
- What a Performance!, 1962
- Dancing Attendance, 1967
