= Fairey Delta 2 =

1950s British supersonic research aircraft

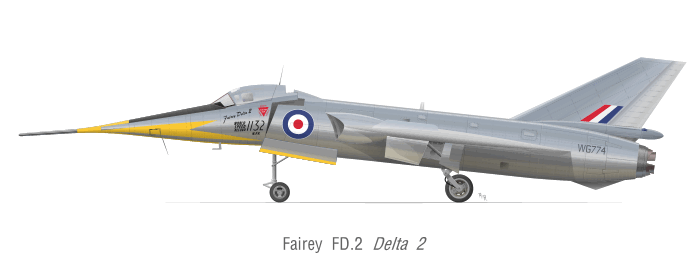
- World speed record holder WG774

General information
- Type: high-speed research aircraft
- National origin: United Kingdom
- Manufacturer: Fairey Aviation Company
- Status: On public display
- Primary user: Royal Aircraft Establishment
- Number built: 2

History
- Introduction date: Experimental
- First flight: 6 October 1954
- Retired: 1966 (WG777), 1973 (WG774)

The Fairey Delta 2 or FD2 (internal designation Type V within Fairey) is a British supersonic research aircraft that was produced by the Fairey Aviation Company in response to a specification from the Ministry of Supply for a specialised aircraft for conducting investigations into flight and control at transonic and supersonic speeds. Features included a delta wing and a drooped nose. On 6 October 1954, the Delta 2 made its maiden flight, flown by Fairey test pilot Peter Twiss; two aircraft would be produced. The Delta 2 was the final aircraft to be produced by Fairey as an independent manufacturer.

The Fairey Delta 2 was the first jet aircraft to exceed 1,000 miles per hour (1,600 km/h) in level flight. On 10 March 1956, it set a new world speed record of 1,132 mph (1,822 km/h), exceeding the previous official record by 310 mph (500 km/h). (Note: Far exceeded both the official 1955 record of 822.1 mph (1,323.0 km/h) by the "C" variant of a North American F-100 Super Sabre and the secret 1947 record (by 241 mph (388 km/h)) of 891 mph (1,434 km/h) by the Bell X-1.) The Delta 2 held the absolute World Air Speed Record for over a year. It continued to be used for flight testing, and was allocated to the Royal Aircraft Establishment (RAE) in 1958.

A testbed aircraft was required to verify design calculations and wind tunnel results for the Concorde "ogee delta" wing design so one of the aircraft was extensively rebuilt as the BAC 221. On 1 May 1964, the modified aircraft performed its first flight. The FD2 was also used as the basis for Fairey's submissions to the Ministry for advanced all-weather interceptor designs, culminating in the proposed Fairey Delta 3 to meet the F.155 specification; however, the FD3 never got past the drawing-board stage.

== Development ==
=== Background ===
During the late 1940s, Fairey Aviation, a British aircraft manufacturer, had become interested in delta wing technology and proceeded to submit multiple submissions based on the delta wing concept to the Ministry of Supply. The Ministry, being interested in these proposals, issued orders for models to test the envisioned delta wing, the first of which being built in 1947; testing was performed by the Royal Aircraft Establishment (RAE). The program was succeeded multiple times, including an investigation into potential VTOL operations, leading to further flight tests of the delta wing models to be conducted in Cardigan Bay, Wales and Woomera, Australia. In 1947, Air Ministry Specification E.10/47 was issued for a full-scale piloted delta wing aircraft, resulting in the Fairey Delta 1, which conducted its maiden flight at RAF Boscombe Down on 12 March 1951.

Meanwhile, throughout the early and mid 1950s, the Royal Air Force (RAF) had developed an intense desire to advance the performance of their aircraft; in particular, the service sought new fighter aircraft that would be capable of routinely flying at very high speeds and high altitudes as a long-term replacement for its existing inventory of roughly 700 first-generation jet fighters. At the time, there was a perception that Britain was trailing behind in supersonic aircraft design, and there was pressure to correct this. Events such as the Korean War and rapid advances in the fields of supersonic aerodynamics, structures and aero engines by the British aircraft industry had the effect of increasing demand and the potential capabilities of new fighters. In addition to developing improved versions of existing and emerging fighters such as the Hawker Hunter and Gloster Javelin, there was an appetite for even more promising entirely new aircraft.

Following on from the Delta 1, the Ministry of Supply requested that Fairey conduct a further model programme for the purpose of transonic investigations. However, Fairey did not find this proposal attractive, believing that a piloted aircraft would be mandatory if the project was to produce any worthwhile data. Fairey commenced work on a highly swept twin-engine aircraft; however, the Ministry lacked enthusiasm for the twin-engine configuration, largely due to an existing rival project underway to produce a twin-engine supersonic aircraft – this would become the English Electric Lightning. In February 1949, it was suggested that Fairey examine the prospects for a single-engine transonic aircraft as an alternative; by the end of the year, the company had produced their new project, out of which the Fairey Delta 2 (FD2) would directly originate. Accordingly, the Ministry issued Air Ministry Specification ER.103 for the project, ordering that a pair of prototype aircraft be produced.

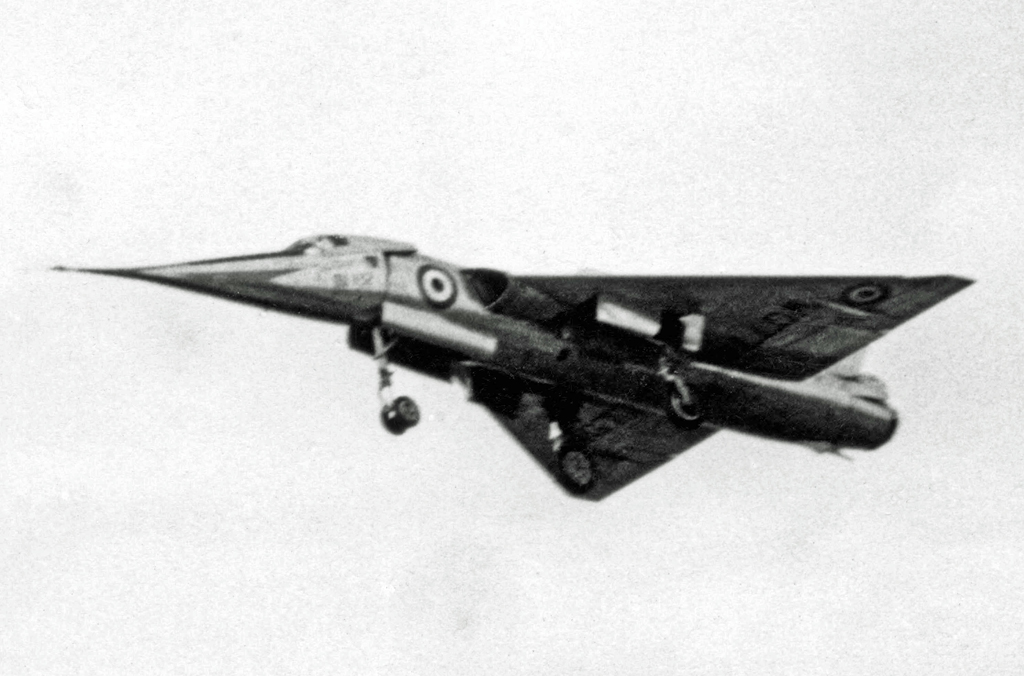
The first Delta 2 WG774 in its original design format landing at Farnborough Airport in 1956 during that year's SBAC Show using its 'droop snoot', described by its inventor as a sectional fuselage

At the time, Fairey was mostly known for producing naval aircraft, such as the Fairey Swordfish biplane and the Fairey Firefly monoplane; the design team lacked experience with high speed projects. As a remedy to this, in October 1951, Sir Robert Lickley of Hawker Aircraft was promptly recruited as Fairey's new Chief Engineer and became a major force behind the programme. Data that had been obtained from the earlier model work also proved to have been highly valuable to the Fairy Delta 2 programme. Early development work on the FD2 would be hindered by two major factors, a lack of available information on wing and intake design, and the declaring of Fairey Gannet as a 'super-priority' by the British government, which had necessitated delays.

In September 1952, technical drawings of the Fairey Delta 2 were issued and the development proper commenced. From the project's beginning, Fairey designed the parameters of the FD2 to intentionally exceed that which was necessary only to achieving Mach 1. In addition to seeking very high performance, the design adopted a general configuration and structure that would be readily adapted to future military requirements, so that it could potentially become a fighter aircraft. In total, a pair of flight-capable aircraft were produced: Serial numbers WG774 and WG777. WG777, the second to be manufactured, was very similar to WG774 except the underwing flap system was not incorporated. There were also a few differences in terms of equipment and instrumentation. In addition to the two flying aircraft, a single static test airframe was also completed.

=== Flight testing ===
On 6 October 1954, WG774, the first FD2 to be completed, conducted its maiden flight, flown by Fairey test pilot Peter Twiss. According to aviation author Derek Wood, the Delta 2 "proved to be an exceptional aeroplane from the outset". On 17 November 1954, WG774 suffered an engine flameout on its 14th flight when internal pressure build-up collapsed the fuselage collector tank, closing off the fuel supply to the engine, while heading away from the airfield at 30,000 ft (9,100 m), 30 mi (50 km) after taking off from RAF Boscombe Down. Twiss managed to glide to a dead-stick landing at high speed on the airfield. Only the nose gear had deployed, and the aircraft sustained damage that put it out of action for eight months. Twiss, who was shaken up by the experience but otherwise uninjured, received the Queen's Commendation for Valuable Service in the Air. One result of the crash was a temporary halt on the test programme, which did not resume until August 1955.

During early flight tests, repeated supersonic test runs over southern Britain were conducted; as a result of these flights, a number of claims for damages against the supersonic booms were received. Tests of the Delta 2's low-level supersonic flight capability were disrupted due to the perceived heightened risk posed by supersonic booms being produced during lower altitude flight; as such, the Ministry of Supply refused to allow this testing to be performed over the UK. Despite this refusal, Fairey was able to base the Delta 2 temporarily in France and later in Norway so that the tests could be performed. The French government required the tests to be insured against damage claims; this demand had proved unacceptable with two British insurance companies quoting a premium of about £1,000 per flight; however, a French company insured them for £40. No claims were ever received in either France or Norway.

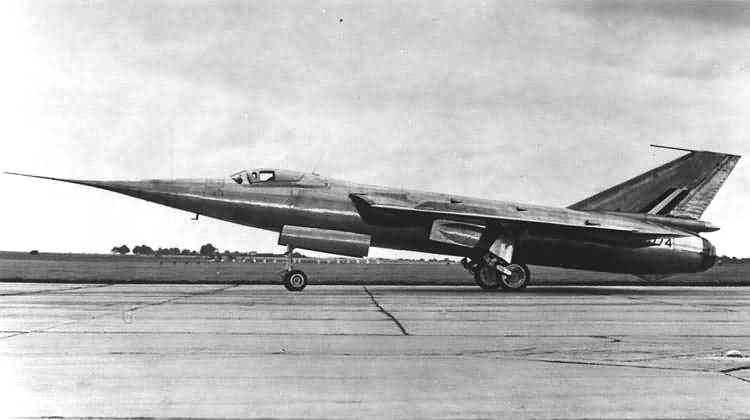
WG774 with the original polished-metal finish. It later received yellow stripes, followed by a purple and yellow scheme, before conversion to the BAC 221

On 15 February 1956, WG777, the second Delta 2, performed its maiden flight from RAF Boscombe Down; piloted by Twiss, the aircraft reached transonic speeds during this first flight. Following the final contractor check flight on 14 April 1956, WG777 was formally accepted, upon which it was assigned to the RAE's high-speed research programme, conducting measurement, stability and handling research. In September 1956, both aircraft performed flight displays at the Farnborough Airshow in Hampshire. The Delta 2 was typically used to conduct a multitude of tests including aerodynamics characteristics, handling, and stability performance.

Testing of the Delta 2 was carried out in France for some time, in part due to Fairey's good relations with Dassault Aviation of France and the French Air Force. In October and November 1956, a total of 47 low-level supersonic test flights were conducted from Cazaux Air Base, Bordeaux, France; a detachment of Dassault engineers observed these trials, learning a great deal about delta wing aircraft from the FD2. Dassault had flown the MD.550 Mystère-Delta design in June 1955, which Wood notes "bore a striking resemblance to the layout of the FD.2". The MD.550 design would proceed to be manufactured as the successful Dassault Mirage III fighter, which first flew two days after the return of the FD.2 from the tests in France. Wood credits the Delta 2 as having served to confirm Dassault's theories and supporting the Mirage III program.

Once the manufacturer's testing was completed, both aircraft were formally handed over to the RAE. In addition to providing the institution with useful information on the characteristics of the 60°-swept delta wing, from 1958 onwards, the FD2 aircraft participated in various research projects and flying trials, including an investigation into the performance of ejector-type propulsive nozzles. The substantial rebuilding of the aircraft to participate in further research was first mooted in that same year as well. In its original configuration, the Delta 2 performed flight tests, interspersed with periods of storage, up until mid-1966.

=== Breaking the world airspeed record ===
During August 1955, the Delta 2 flew at supersonic speed without using its reheat since the testing schedule did not yet require its use at that time. According to Wood, many members of the development team recognised that the FD2 possessed huge speed potential, beyond any other British-built aircraft in existence of that time. During early flight testing, Twiss came to realise that the Delta 2 would be capable of speeds above 1,000 miles per hour (1,600 km/h) and proposed that it be flown on with the aim of breaking the current air speed record, which had then been held since 1955 by a North American F-100 Super Sabre. However, Fairey found the Ministry of Supply unsupportive, having adopted the prevailing belief being that crewed military aircraft would soon be replaced by guided missiles. Fairey had great difficulty in obtaining permission for the attempt. Twiss stated that the situation was "curiously inverted" from expectations, having expected that government agencies would have been enthusiastically pressing for a record-breaking flight as a means to bolster national prestige.

According to Wood, Fairey was confronted by a combination of scepticism and apathy from Her Majesty's Civil Service, to the extent that it appeared that the government were opposing the endeavour. The Ministry of Supply sought to avoid any association with a speed record bid while Rolls-Royce, the FD2's engine manufacturer, also dismissed the attempt, claiming that the air intakes were unsuitable for speeds around Mach 1.5, and that the Avon engine would disintegrate at such speeds, despite an absence of any practical data to support this assertion. In spite of this opposition, Fairey sought to continue, and were given permission to proceed. The Ministry provided no financial support, having opted instead to loan the aircraft itself to Fairey and to charge the firm for its use of RAE assets. Fairey also had to finance its own insurance. Regardless, Fairey chose to continue with the record attempt.

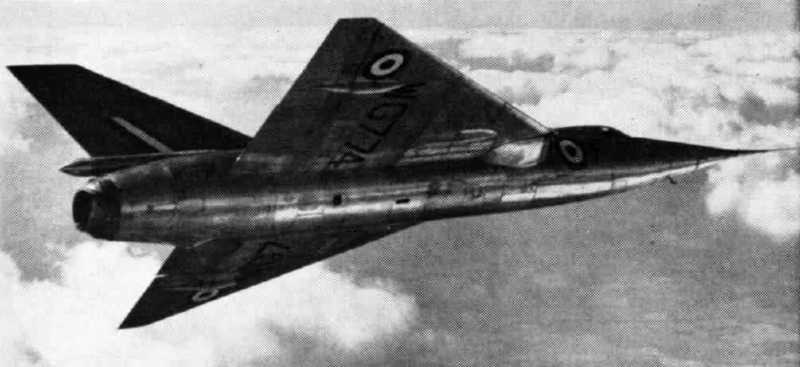
The first Fairey Delta 2 (s/n WG774) in flight, circa 1956

In order to reduce the risk of another competitor beating them to it, preparations had to be carried out in a short space of time and in great secrecy. The development and deployment of equipment suitable for the accurate measurement of flight at such speeds was a challenge in itself. For this purpose, a variety of ground measurement cameras were set up at Chichester and at RNAS Ford, various ground markers were installed at specified locations, and radar tracking from RNAS Ford and RAF Sopley; flights by Gloster Meteors and de Havilland Venoms for calibration purposes were also conducted by the RAF. Operational demands on both the pilot and ground crews were severe and many runs were attempted but failed to qualify on one technicality or another. On the final day available, the first run also failed; the second and last run that day became the only chance left before the attempt would end.

On 10 March 1956, the Fairey Delta 2 broke the World Air Speed Record, raising it to 1,132 mph (1,811 km/h) or Mach 1.73. This achievement exceeded the prior recorded airspeed record by 310 mph, or 37 per cent; never before had the record ever been raised by such a margin. The achievement had also made the Fairey Delta 2 the first jet aircraft to exceed 1,000 mph (1,600 km/h) in level flight.

News of the new airspeed record quickly spread and had a prompt impact upon the international aeronautics industry, typical reactions being shock and near-disbelief. According to Wood, consequences included in-depth studies of the FD2 airframe by the United States and the major reshaping of military aircraft programs in France. Fairey itself was elated with the achievement, viewing it as a practical endorsement of their design, and fuelled the firm's ambitions to establish a family of supersonic fighters on its basis. The record stood until 12 December 1957, when it was beaten by a McDonnell JF-101A Voodoo of the United States Air Force.

=== Proposed derivatives ===
Fairey produced a number of proposals which would have involved the further development of the Delta 2. The first of these was another experimental aircraft, designated as the ER.103/B, which would have paired the wings of the FD2 with a revised fuselage, which had a greater span and length. The ER.103/B was to have been powered by either a de Havilland Gyron or Rolls-Royce RB.122 and would have accommodated underwing fuel tanks for extended endurance. A combat fighter model, the ER.103/C, was also proposed, upon which the wings would have been scaled up by 50 per cent, with no radical aerodynamic alterations made. Combat equipment would have been provisioned, including a Ferranti-built aircraft interception radar 1495 and de Havilland Firestreak air-to-air missiles. Fairey claimed that the ER.103/C would be capable of attaining Mach 2.26 at an altitude of 55,000 feet (17,000 m).

"If it were not for the clumsy way in which you tackle things in Britain, you could have made the Mirage yourself."

— Marcel Dassault, founder of Dassault Aviation

According to Fairey's projections, the ER.103/B could have been ready to fly within eighteen months of having received an order, while the ER.103/C could reach the same readiness within 30 months. In particular, Fairey pursued Operational Requirement F.155, which called for a two-seat fighter equipped with radar and missiles with suitable performance to achieve an altitude of 60,000 feet (18,000 m) and Mach 2 within six minutes of taking off; while the company thought that their design would be fully capable of meeting the specified requirements, it was believed that the complete weapon system would not be fully developed until 1962. Thus, Fairey proposed that a simpler interim aircraft, if selected, could be available by 1960 or potentially earlier.

In addition to the Gyron engine of earlier proposals, the proposed fighter was to be equipped with a pair of de Havilland Spectre rocket engines that were mounted in fairings on the rear fuselage. The high-test peroxide (HTP) fuel for the rocket engines was stored in tanks held in underwing fairings and within the wing's leading edge, separate from the turbojet engine's fuel storage. It featured a two-man crew, a pilot and radar operator/navigation, seated in a side-by-side configuration. The fuselage was area ruled while large rectangular variable air intakes were adopted. As specified, the fighter was tentatively armed with wingtip-mounted de Havilland Red Top air-to-air missiles. Further design revisions saw the single Gyron engine being replaced by a pair of RB.122 engines instead and the adoption of the Red Dean missile, alongside refinements such as intake improvements and increased internal fuel capacity. Fairey stated that the aircraft was suited to interceptor duties at various altitudes, strike and aerial reconnaissance missions were also mooted.

On 1 April 1957, Fairey were informed by officials within the Ministry of Supply that their proposals were the favourite to meet Operational Requirement F.155. However, on 4 April 1957, Duncan Sandys, the Minister of Defence, announced the effective termination of nearly all fighter aircraft development for the RAF, instantly removing the F.155 requirement.

A final attempt was made to progress a Delta 2 derivative into production came during the late 1950s for the new German Air Force of West Germany. Running against a competing American bid with the Lockheed F-104G Starfighter, Fairey joined forces with Rolls-Royce and Dassault in a collaborative effort to produce a delta wing aircraft capable of reaching Mach 2 to meet the German demand for fighter aircraft. The proposal would have seen Dassault produce the wings, Fairey manufacture the fuselage, and Rolls-Royce provide the engine, which was intended to be a Rolls-Royce Spey engine with reheat; Belgium also played a role in the programme. However, the American lobby proved to be too strong, in part due to the subsequently uncovered Lockheed bribery scandals that had influenced German decision makers, and the F-104G was selected instead. This was the end for the FD2 as a fighter concept; the concept never saw any use as a production aircraft; Wood summarised the state of affairs as "the harvest was left to France to gather".

=== BAC 221 ===
The Concorde design used a then-new type of delta wing that was being developed at the RAE known as the ogee or ogival delta design. This design aimed to improve both supersonic wave drag with high leading-edge sweep and low thickness/chord ratio at the root, and low-speed lift through flow separation at the leading edge which creates a rolled up vortex on top of the wing. The added suction under the vortex increases lift by an amount known as vortex lift. The wing root chord should be as long as possible, and highly swept where it meets the forward fuselage. Continued studies of this basic concept led to the ogee layout and it eventually became apparent that a series of full-scale flight tests would be necessary for its validation.

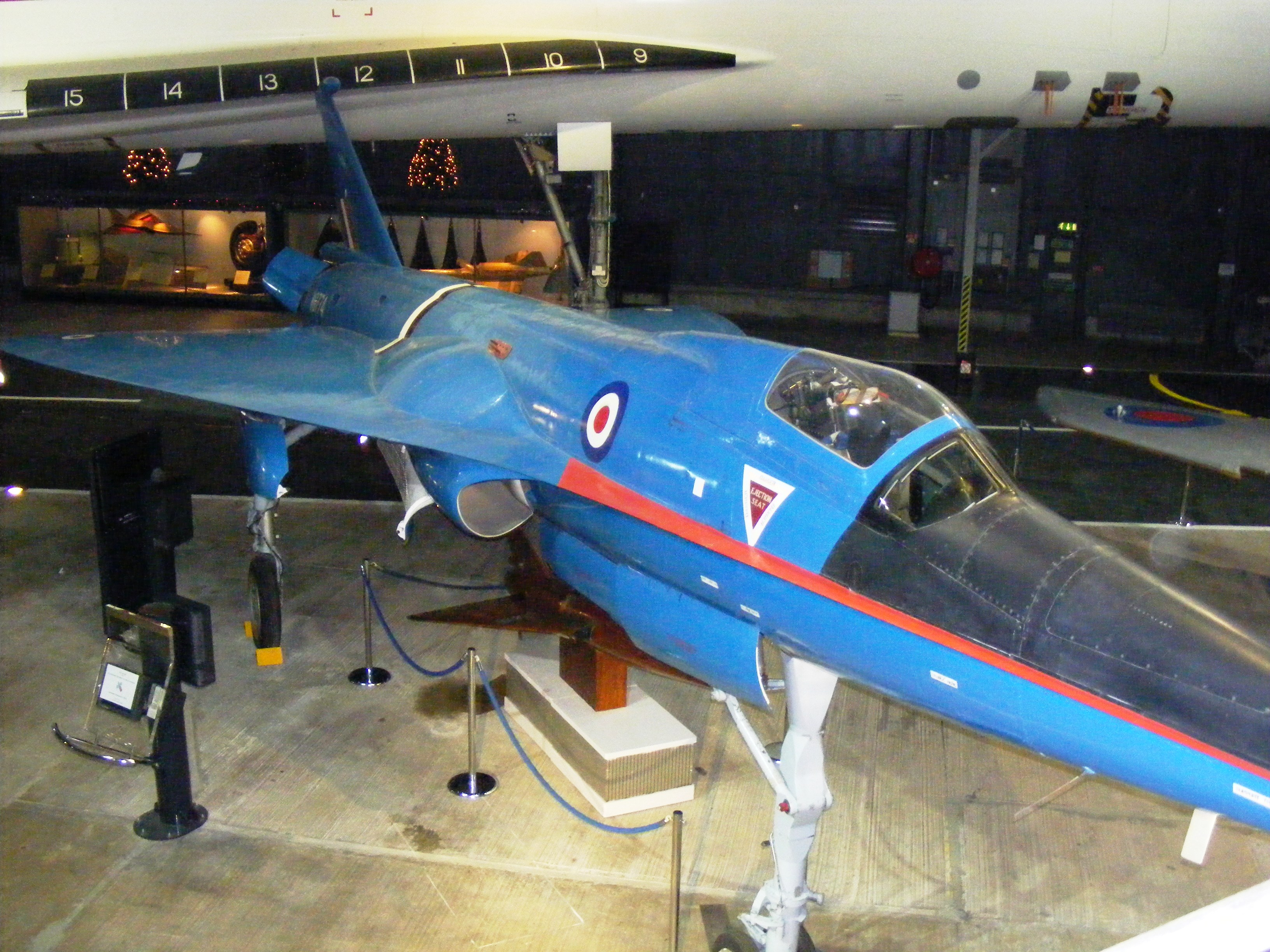
BAC 221 at the Fleet Air Arm Museum. The forward wing extension and curved leading edge can be seen

Low-speed testing of the concept was already being provided by the Handley Page HP.115. Although high-speed performance appeared to be predictable, a dedicated testbed aircraft was desired, especially for drag measurements. As early as 1958, the RAE and Fairey began discussions about converting one of the Delta 2 prototypes to support the ogee wing. Fairey proposed stretching the fuselage a further three feet to better match the long planform, with the wing extending out onto the drooping nose. However, calculations showed that this extension was not great enough to counter the forward moving centre of pressure (CoP) that resulted from the extended planform, and there were also concerns that the over-wing engine intakes would swallow the vortex above the wing.

During 1960, further development activity was disrupted by the purchase of Fairey by Westland Aircraft, who assigned further work on the conversion project to Hunting Aircraft. Accordingly, in July 1960, the programme moved to Bristol and was now a part of the larger British Aircraft Corporation (BAC). Bristol suggested two ways forward, a minimal conversion with a sub-optimal wing but no other major changes, or a "maximal" conversion with a larger six foot extension to the fuselage and a much taller landing gear more typical of the type expected on the Concorde. Both would also be equipped with a new Elliott Brothers stabilization system, and have the engine intakes moved under the wing. The minimal conversion was considered to be more of a 'compromise', being less slender and lacking the additional fuel capacity that the maximal option provided for.

In early September 1960, it was agreed that the "maximal" conversion would proceed; on 5 September of that year, WG774 was flown to Bristol's Filton facility. Following a period of detailed design work, the re-manufacturing process commenced in April 1961. Considerable cost-cutting measures and management strategies, such as PERT, were adopted by BAC in order to not overrun on the fixed-price contract it had been issued for the work; some engineers were allegedly frustrated by this as apparent means of further improvement were dismissed. On 7 July 1961, the newly christened BAC 221 was completed. Various problems were encountered during the conversion. The newly lengthened landing gear required more hydraulic fluid, which required a larger reservoir to hold it, a higher capacity pump to move it quickly enough through the system, and so on through the hydraulic system. Moving the intakes below the wing meant they were no longer in-line with the compressor face so the ducting to the engine was curved upwards giving a noticeable bulge on the wing upper surface. No attempt was made to fit variable intakes. At high throttle settings, considerable suction into the inlets was generated; in the event of a sudden down-throttle motion by the pilot would result in air "spilling" out of the intakes, which was a concern because it could flow above the wing and disrupt the vortex. Small lips were added to the intakes to help prevent this, but this proved to cause intake buzzing. Changes to the ducts, assisted by Rolls-Royce, addressed this issue.

One major advantage of the new design was its larger fuel capacity, which has been a major problem for the original FD2. The Delta 2 had often run low on fuel while still accelerating, thereby never reaching its full performance. The modifications for the 221 meant it was not capable of the same levels of performance; however, speeds of Mach 1.6 were attained during its test flights. In total, the BAC 221 featured a new wing, engine inlet configuration, a Rolls-Royce Avon RA.28, modified vertical stabilizer and a lengthened undercarriage to mimic Concorde's attitude on the ground. It first flew on 1 May 1964. The sole 221 was used for varied flight testing from 1964 until 1973, after which it was placed on public display.

== Design ==
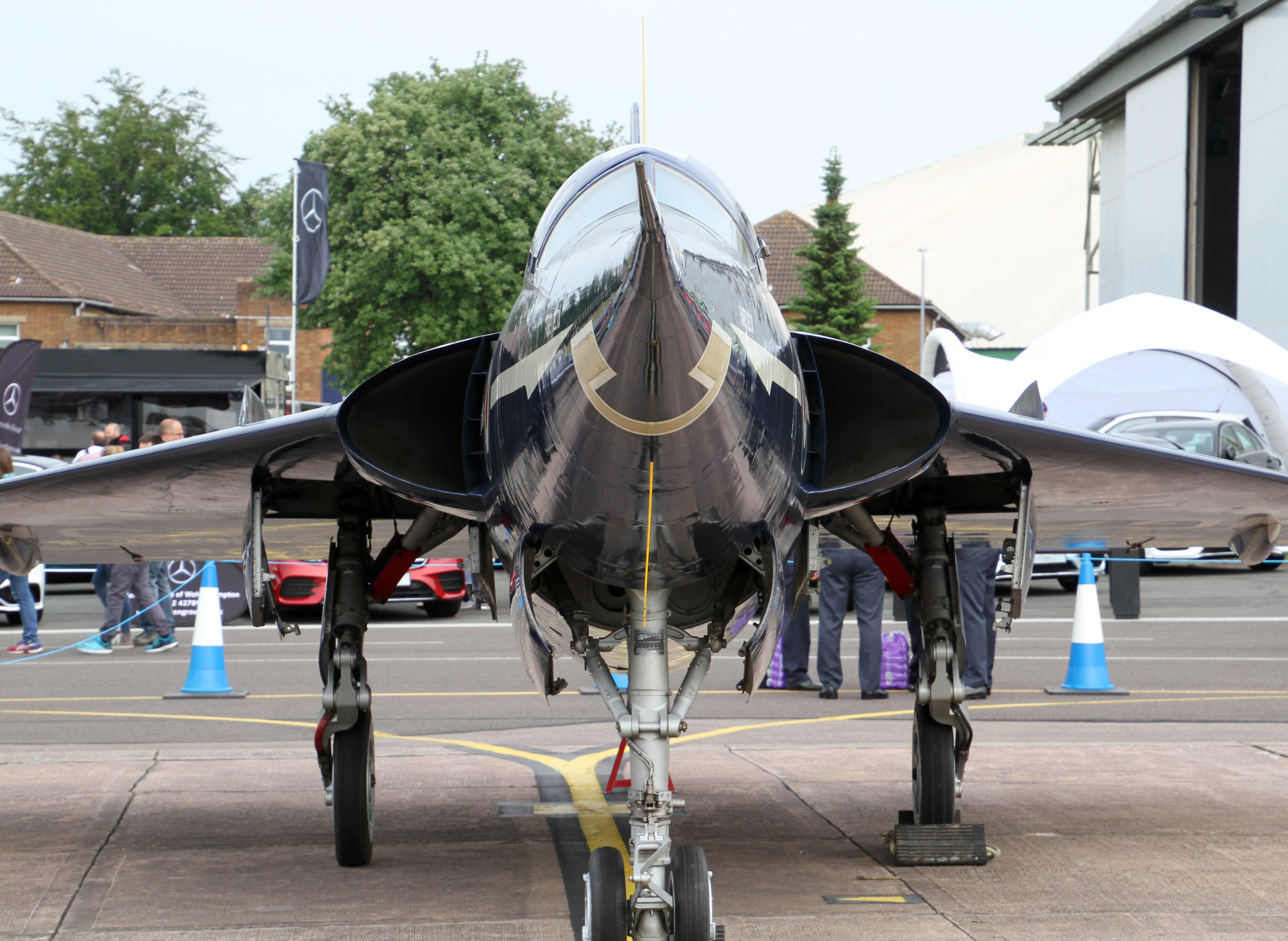
Head-on view of an FD2 on static display, June 2016

The Fairey Delta 2 has a mid-wing tailless delta monoplane. It was powered by a single Rolls-Royce Avon RA.14R turbojet engine with reheat. The engine was fed by air intakes which were blended into the wing roots and featured an eyelid-type nozzle. Located just forward of the nozzle were petal-type air brakes.

The Delta 2 has a cylindrical cross-section fuselage, which closely fitted the Avon engine, and smoothly flowed into a long tapered nose. A long nose would normally have obscured the pilot's forward vision during landing, take-off and movement on the ground; so, to provide adequate visibility a drooped nose was fitted; the nose section, including the cockpit, could be drooped 10° using a hydraulically actuated mechanism, in a similar manner to that which was used later on Concorde.

The Delta 2 has a relatively small cockpit for the pilot which left little room for the installation of additional equipment. The Delta was the first British aircraft to fly using all-powered controls. These controls, designed and produced by Fairey, were fully duplicated. The flight control system was hydraulically operated and possessed no mechanical backup. Fairey had recently developed a new high-pressure hydraulic system and this was used in the design. The hydraulics provided no feedback or "feel" to the pilot's controls, so another system providing artificial feel was necessary.

The wing features a 60° sweep of the leading edge and was very thin, at only 4% thickness-chord ratio, making the Delta 2's wing one of the thinnest known at that time. The internal space housed both the main undercarriage and a total of four fuel tanks without any bulges or fairings in the wing, while four spars provided for significant structural strength. The sizable horn-balanced ailerons and inboard elevators gave the Delta 2 a high level of manoeuvrability.

== Aircraft on display ==
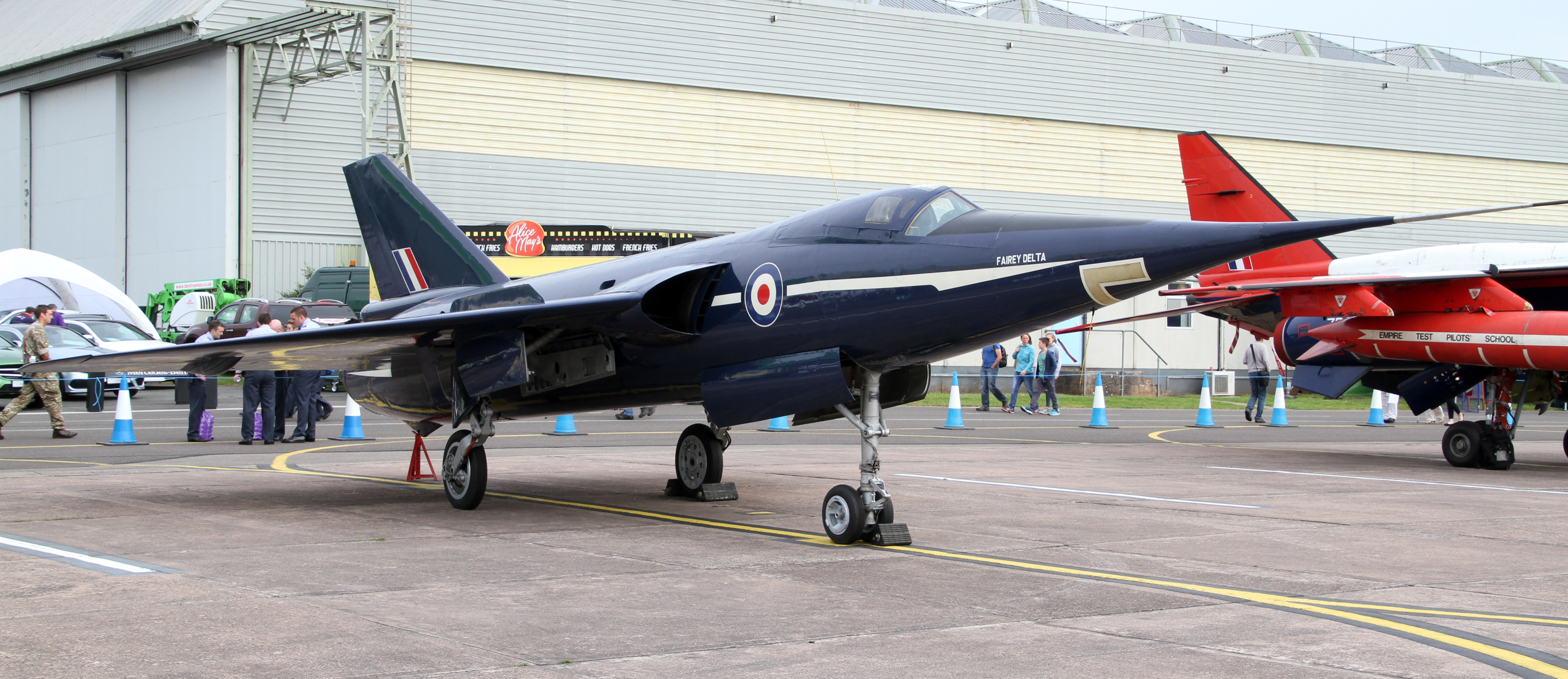
WG777 preserved at the Royal Air Force Museum Cosford

- WG774, in BAC 221 form, is now on display alongside the British Concorde prototype at the Fleet Air Arm Museum at Yeovilton.
- WG777, is preserved at the Royal Air Force Museum Cosford.

== Operators ==
United Kingdom

- Royal Aircraft Establishment

== Specifications (Fairey Delta 2) ==
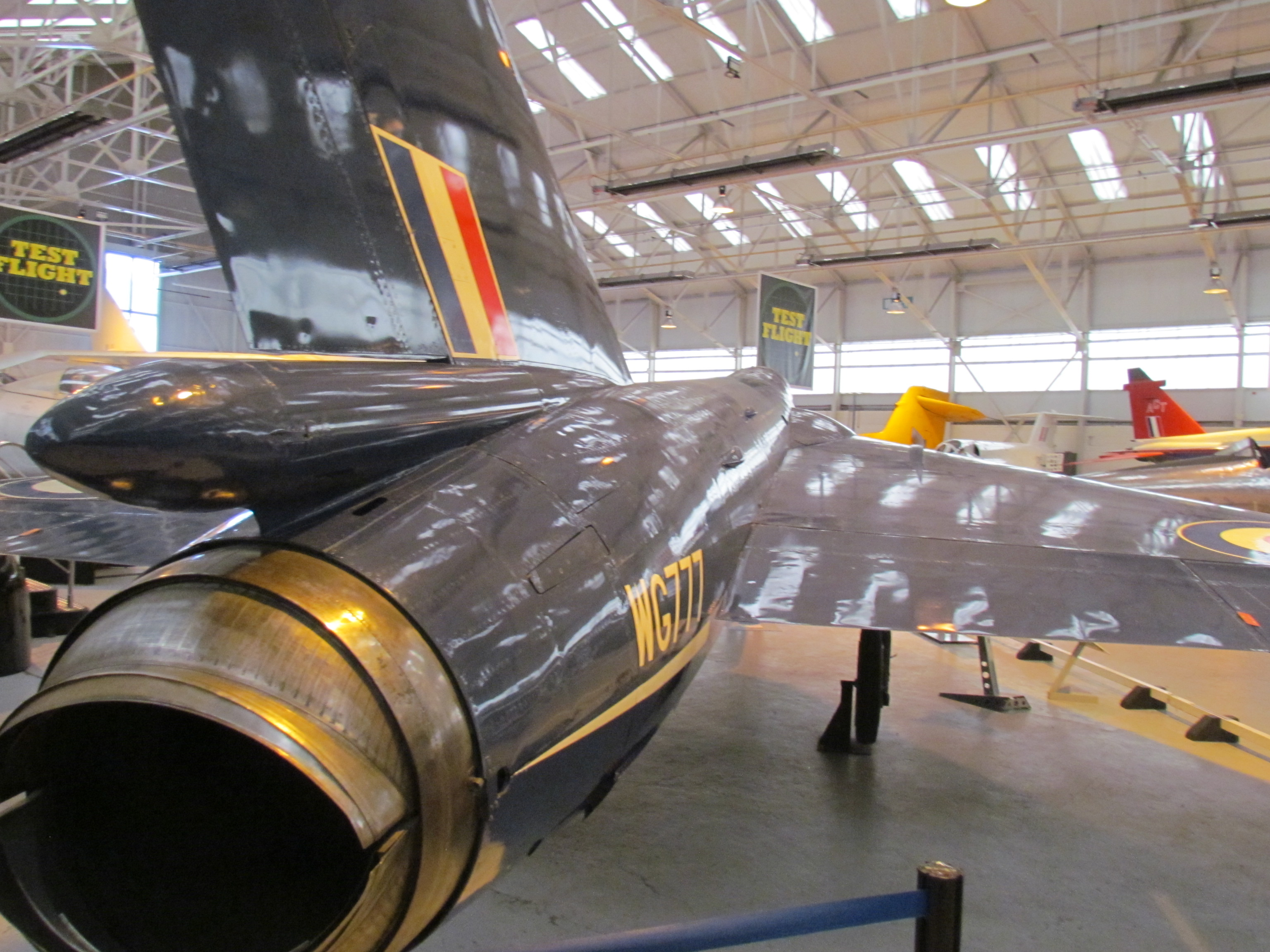
Close-up rear view of the Delta 2

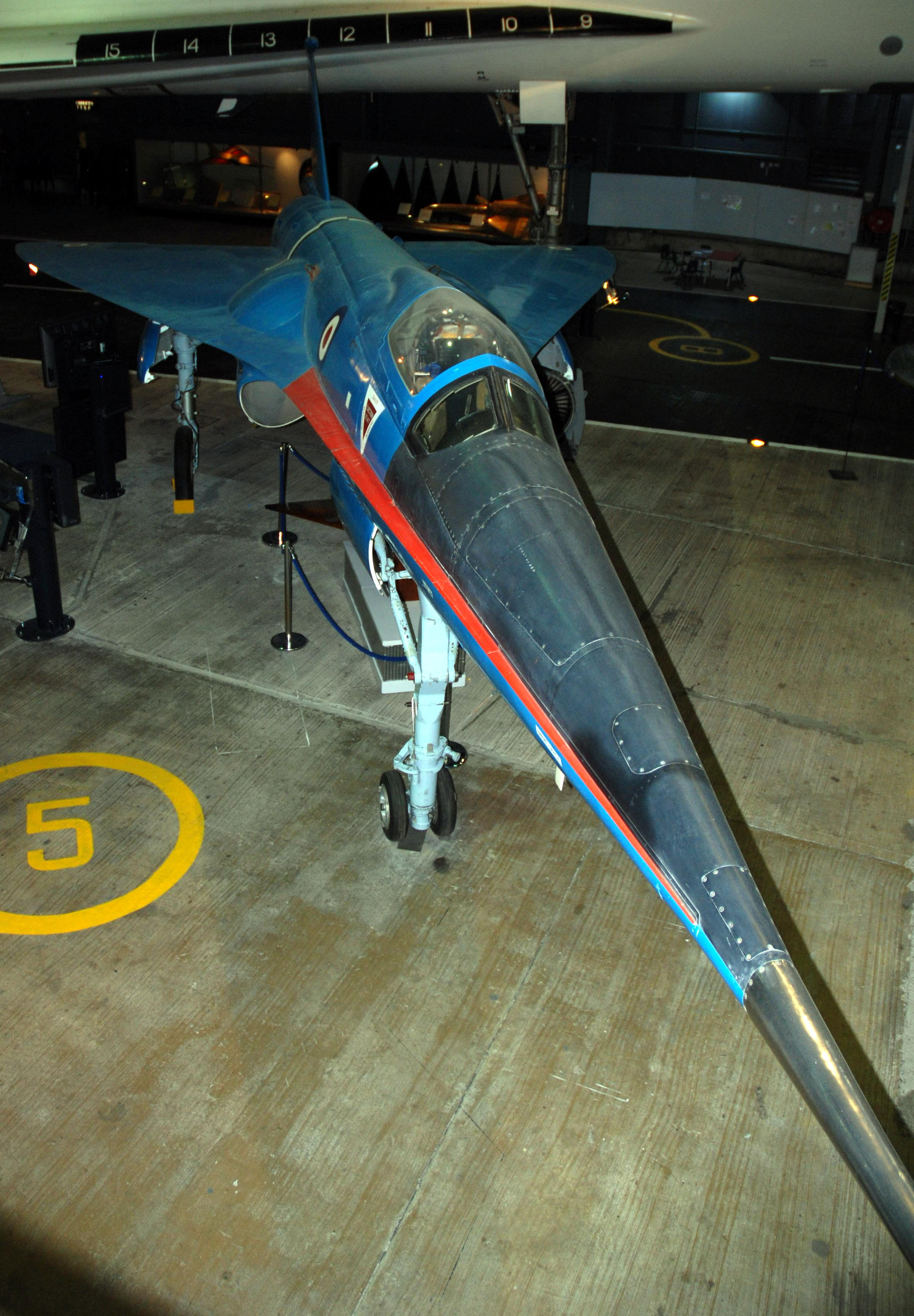
Forward view of the Delta 2. Note the drooped nose

Data from The Illustrated Encyclopedia of Aircraft

General characteristics

- Crew: 1
- Length: 51 ft 7.5 in (15.74 m)
- Wingspan: 26 ft 10 in (8.18 m)
- Height: 11 ft 0 in (3.35 m)
- Wing area: 360 sq ft (33.44 m^{2})
- Empty weight: 11,000 lb (4,990 kg)
- Gross weight: 13,884 lb (6,298 kg)
- Powerplant: 1 × Rolls-Royce Avon RA.14R , 10,000 lbf (44 kN) thrust with only one reheat setting, later replaced with an RA.28 as used for speed record

Performance

- Maximum speed: 1,300 mph (2,092 km/h, 1,100 kn)
- Range: 830 mi (1,336 km, 720 nmi)

== See also ==
- Flight airspeed record
- Peter Twiss
- Concorde

Related development

- Fairey Delta 1

Aircraft of comparable role, configuration, and era

- Dassault Mirage
- English Electric P1A
- Bristol 188
- Avro 707C
- Mikoyan-Gurevich MiG-21I Analog

Related lists

- List of experimental aircraft
