= Fairey Delta 1 =

Research airplane

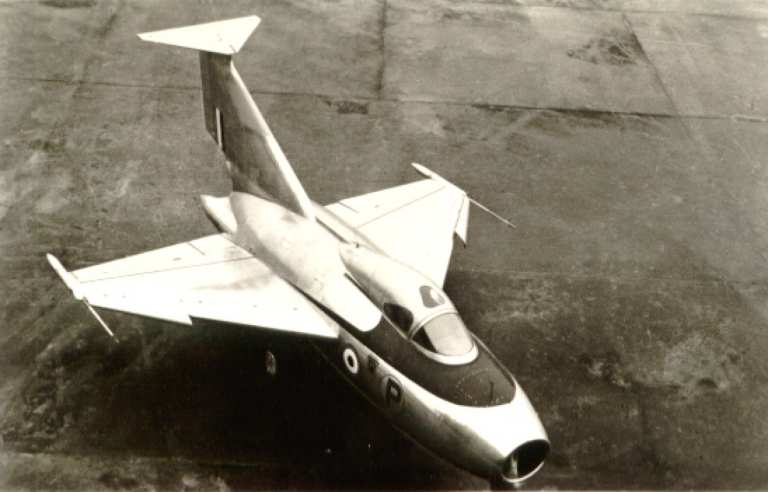
- Fairey Delta 1

General information
- Type: Research aircraft
- National origin: United Kingdom
- Manufacturer: Fairey Aviation Company
- Number built: 1

History
- First flight: 12 March 1951
- Retired: 1956

The Fairey Delta 1 (FD1) was a research aircraft developed and produced by British aircraft manufacturer Fairey Aviation. It holds the distinction of being the first British-designed aircraft to be furnished with a delta wing.

Initially referred to as the Type R, work on the aircraft had begun with the intention of developing a ramp-launched vertical takeoff (VTO) fighter. As its design was refined, the VTO features were discarded, instead exploring other concepts in line with Air Ministry Specification E.10/47. Accordingly, the aircraft was developed to investigate the then-unfamiliar qualities of the delta wing, particularly its flight characteristics when flown at transonic speeds. A total of three aircraft were ordered by the Ministry of Supply (MoS). The type received the name "Fairey Delta" shortly thereafter.

The first aircraft was produced at Fairey's facility in Heaton Chapel, Stockport. Ground testing commenced during mid-1950. On 12 March 1951, the FD1 performed its maiden flight, being flown by Fairey test pilot Group Captain R. Gordon. The aircraft received several modifications as a consequence of a landing accident in September 1951. Further flight testing determined that the FD1 exhibited numerous unfavourable qualities in terms of handling and stability, which contributed to the cancellation of the two further airframes. Following the end of government interest, Fairey continued to operate the sole completed FD1 to support their own research purposes up until the aircraft sustained substantial damage in a landing accident on 6 February 1956, after which it was deemed uneconomic to repair.

== Design and development ==
What would become the Fairey Delta 1 (FD1) had been originally conceived internally by Fairey as a vertical takeoff (VTO) fighter. In concept, the company hoped that it would be a capable interceptor aircraft that could be launched from smaller ships as well as aircraft carriers. The specific VTO method intended to be used would have involved a steeply inclined ramp, which was supposed to be mobile. Unlike its launch system, the aircraft would have landed conventionally, being envisaged as being compatible with the existing arresting gear of Royal Navy aircraft carriers. While the Second World War was still being fought when Fairey had begun work on the concept, the conflict's end meant that the urgency of its development was quickly curtailed as well.

During July 1946, Fairey was issued with a contract to further develop their VTO concept aircraft. Prior to the development of full-scale aircraft, a number of pilotless radio-controlled scale models were produced and flown, which supplied Fairey's design team with real world data to support further work. These rocket-powered models explored several diverse forms of swept wings, including forward-swept and compound wing designs. The first model was launched during 1949 from a ship out at sea in Cardigan Bay, Wales. Several later tests of the models was conducted at the RAAF Woomera Range Complex in Australia; a total of 40 models were completed and launched, the last of which during 1953.

While the project was at an early stage, Fairey was actively advocating the value of their research programme to various British official; these efforts attracted the attention of the Ministry of Supply (MoS), as well as some interest from both the Royal Navy and the Royal Air Force. After evaluating the concept, the MoS decided that it would want the aircraft produced as a more conventional jet-powered research vehicle to fulfil the requirements of Specification E.10/47. Three aircraft were ordered with the name "Fairey Delta" applied to the project; subsequently, the name was changed to Fairey Delta 1.

The Fairey Type R design was a compact mid-wing tailless delta monoplane; aviation periodical Flight observed the aircraft to be "of exceptionally small dimensions". It had a circular cross-section fuselage and a single engine air inlet located at the extreme front. The powerplant adopted for the aircraft was a single Rolls-Royce Derwent 8 centrifugal turbojet engine. According to aviation author Robert Jackson, the FD1 was intended to be outfitted with larger booster rockets to facilitate ramp take-offs, during which control would have been maintained via four swivelling jet nozzles on the rear fuselage. Although designed as a transonic aircraft, the FD1 had a short-coupled, "portly" appearance, completely at odds with Fairey's next design, the sleek and elegant Delta 2.

Fairey stated that the aircraft's delta wing possessed several attributes that were favourable for high speed flight, including relatively low drag characteristics and a comparatively stiff structure, along with stowage space for both fuel and armaments. Although originally envisaged for ramp launching, the FD1 was fitted with a tricycle undercarriage. The FD1 was fitted with a small horizontal delta-shaped control surface on the top of the tailfin; this surface was intended to eliminate adverse instances of "serious pitching as it gathered speed." During early development, a maximum speed of 587 mph as well as the ability to attain an altitude of 30,000 feet within four and a half minutes were envisioned; however, the addition of the new tail surface had the consequence of severely limiting the aircraft's top speed to a relatively pedestrian 345 mph (555 km/h).

== Operational history ==
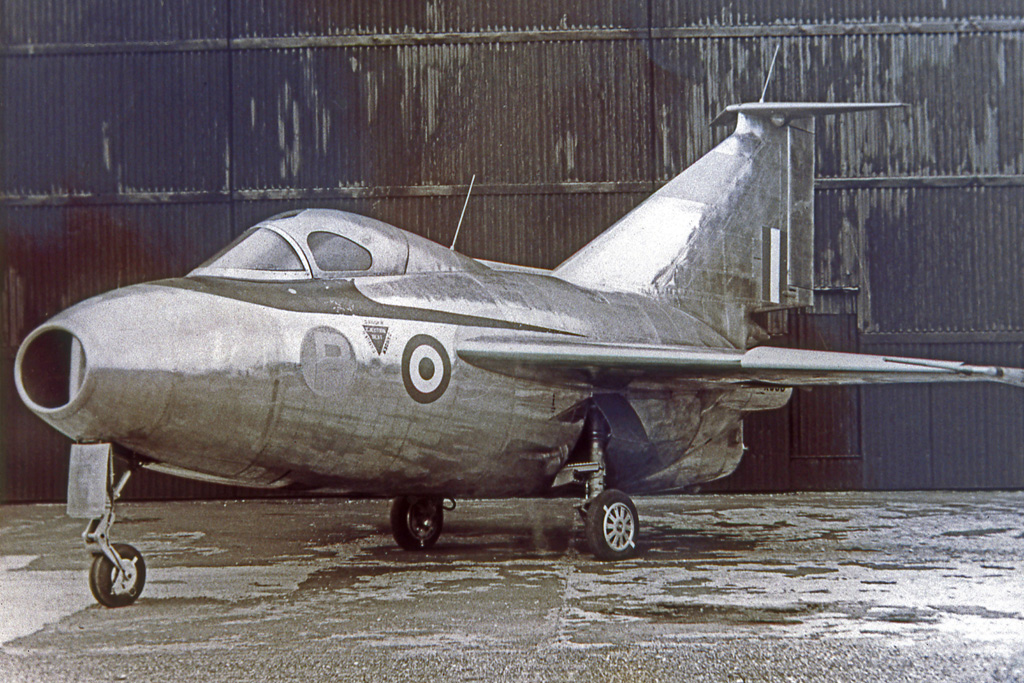
The Fairey Delta One at Manchester (Ringway) Airport in May 1950 assembled for ground taxiing trials. Note it is already fitted with the additional delta-shaped control surface at the tip of its tail fin.

The only FD1 to be completed was built at Fairey's Heaton Chapel Stockport factory and taken by road to their test facility at Manchester's Ringway Airport for final assembly. Starting on 12 May 1950 it made several high-speed taxi runs down the 4,200-foot main runway there before being partially dismantled and transported by road to the Aeroplane and Armament Experimental Establishment (AAEE) at RAF Boscombe Down. After further taxi tests, the aircraft (serial number VX350) made its maiden flight on 12 March 1951; flown by Fairey test pilot Group Captain R. Gordon Slade, this flight lasted for 17 minutes.

The FD1 underwent extensive flight testing, which largely focused on exploring its lateral and longitudinal stability, as well as its overall flying characteristics. These flights helped determine that the aircraft possessed serious stability problems; its lack of stability led to the aircraft being often characterized as being "dangerous." Following a landing accident that occurred in September 1951, the FD1 was grounded for two years. During this time, it received several modifications; changes included the removal of the temporary slots, as well as the deletion of the streamlined housings for the anti-spin parachutes that were mounted at the wingtips. The large control surfaces have been attributed with causing difficulty in controlling the FD1, making it hard to fly with precision, although it could achieve a rapid roll rate.

During 1953, the flight test programme was terminated by the Air Ministry, resulting in the withdrawal of state support for the FD1. Only a single FD1 was built; the second (VX357) and third (VX364) airframes were cancelled prior to production commencing. This decision was not regarded as being a particularly heavy blow to Fairey, even in terms of the firm's ambitions to explore high speed delta wing aircraft, as detailed design work had already commenced on the more capable and sleeker-looking Fairey Delta 2 during the previous year.

Following the programme's cancellation, the sole aircraft continued to be flown for a time by Fairey to perform trials work. On 6 February 1956, the FD1 was damaged beyond repair in a landing accident at Boscombe Down. In October 1956, the aircraft was transported by road for use as a static target on the Shoeburyness weapons range, after which it was later scrapped. Fairey had spent £382,000 of their own money on the FD1.

== Specifications (Fairey Delta 1) ==
Data from Jane's Pocket Book of Research and Experimental Aircraft

General characteristics

- Crew: 1
- Length: 26 ft 3 in (8.00 m)
- Wingspan: 19 ft 6.5 in (5.956 m)
- Height: 19 ft 6.5 in (5.956 m)
- Gross weight: 6,800 lb (3,084 kg)
- Powerplant: 1 × Rolls-Royce Derwent 8 centrifugal-flow turbojet engine, 3,600 lbf (16 kN) thrust

Performance

- Maximum speed: 628 mph (1,011 km/h, 546 kn)

== See also ==
Related development

- Fairey Delta 2

Aircraft of comparable role, configuration, and era

- Avro 707
- Boulton Paul P.111
- Convair XF-92
- Short SB.5

Related lists

- List of experimental aircraft
