= Avro 707 =

British experimental aircraft (1949–1967)

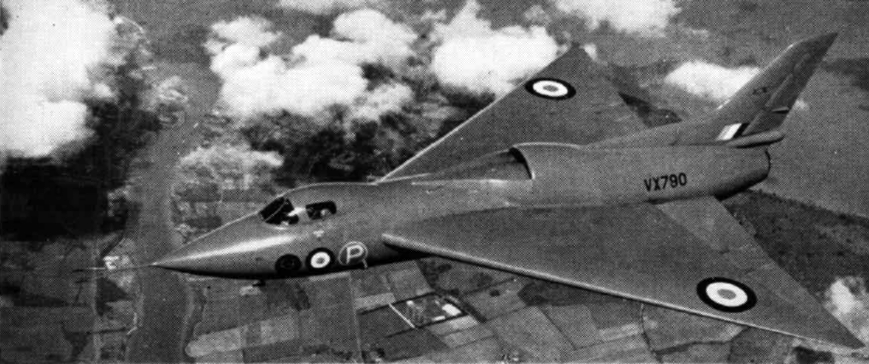
- Avro 707B VX790 in flight, 1951. NACA air intake.

General information
- Type: Experimental aircraft
- Manufacturer: Avro
- Status: 3 aircraft survive in museums
- Primary users: Avro Royal Aircraft Establishment; Australian Aeronautical Research Council
- Number built: 5

History
- First flight: 4 September 1949
- Retired: 1967
- Developed into: Avro Vulcan

The Avro 707 (also known as Type 707) is an experimental aircraft designed and produced by the British aircraft manufacturer Avro.

It was developed to test the tailless thick delta wing configuration chosen for the Avro 698 jet bomber, later named the Vulcan. In particular, the low-speed characteristics of such aircraft were not well known at the time. Aerodynamically, it was a one-third scale version of the Vulcan. The second prototype, VX790, was built to the 707B configuration, featuring a longer nose, alternative cockpit canopy, a modified wing with (51°) sweep, and an elongated nose wheel leg for a greater angle of incidence during both landing and take offs. The twin-seat 707C, the final variant, which had been designed to perform delta wing orientation training with the Royal Air Force; however, no production aircraft would ultimately be produced. The handful of 707s that were produced were largely used for flight testing purposes.

On 4 September 1949, the first Avro 707 performed its maiden flight from RAF Boscombe Down; low-speed testing began shortly thereafter. Higher speed testing commenced in late 1953 using the third aircraft, the first 707A. After development of the Vulcan had been completed, the four surviving 707s continued to be flown as general research aircraft. The prototype 707C was involved in various research programmes, the majority of which were unconnected to the Vulcan. Numerous tests involving the type were conducted by both the Royal Aircraft Establishment (R.A.E) and the Aeronautical Research Laboratories in Australia. During the early 1950s, the Avro 707 performed several public appearances at the Farnborough Airshows. The last flying Avro 707 was grounded during 1967; three aircraft have been preserved and placed on static display in museums.

== Design and development ==
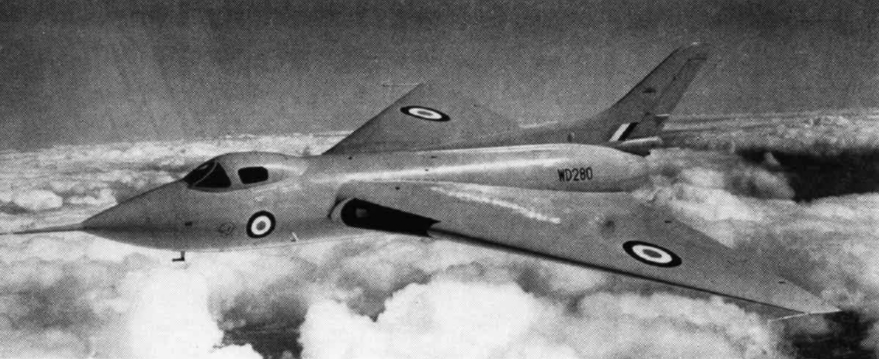
An Avro 707A in flight, 1951.

The Avro 707 originated as a "proof-of-concept" delta wing aircraft that was principally the work of Stuart D. Davies, Avro's chief designer. It was a relatively compact aircraft that initially incorporated a wing with about 50° sweep, without a horizontal tail on a fin with trailing edge sweep. The trailing edge of this wing carried two pairs of control surfaces: inboard elevators and outboard ailerons. These flight surfaces worked in conjunction with a conventional rudder. Retractable airbrakes were also provided above and below the wings. The aircraft featured all-metal stressed-skin construction.

The prototypes were ordered by the Ministry of Supply to fulfil Specification E.15/48, which called for a low-speed research aircraft that would be a one-third scale version of Avro's B.35/46 design for a strategic bomber. Production of this aircraft was accelerated by using several components from other aircraft, such as the canopy of the first prototype being taken from a Gloster Meteor. (Note: "Off-the-shelf" parts included an Avro Athena main undercarriage leg and Gloster Meteor nose leg.) The Avro 707 programme provided valuable insights into the Vulcan's flight characteristics, most of the information coming from the second and third prototypes which flew before the Vulcan. A half-scale aircraft, the Avro 710, was cancelled when it became clear that it would be less time-consuming to develop a high-speed variant of the Avro 707 instead.

All Avro 707s were powered by a single Rolls-Royce Derwent centrifugal turbojet engine. The air intake on the first prototype and later 707B was located on the upper rear fuselage. Some aircraft were outfitted with ejection seats. In total, five Avro 707s were completed. (Note: The last three Avro 707s flew after the Vulcan's first flight on 30 August 1952.)

== Operational history ==
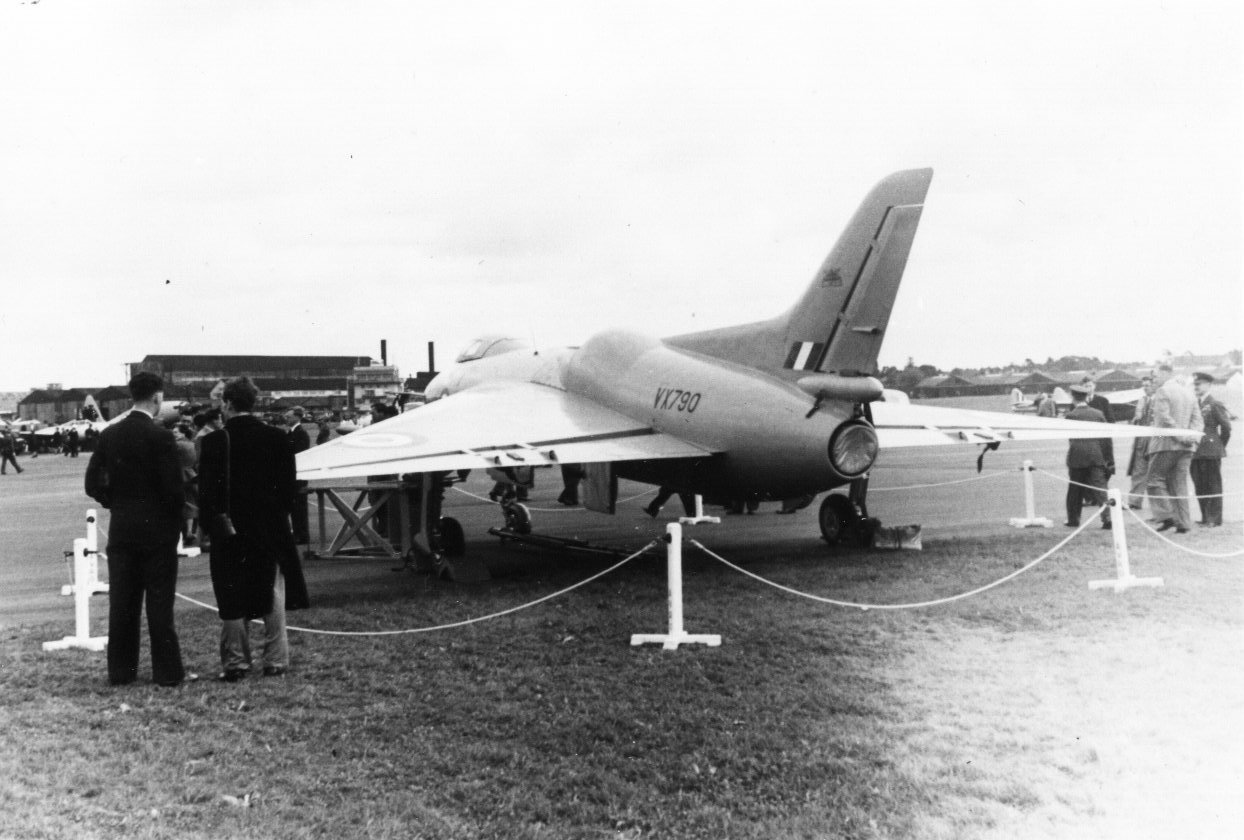
The Avro 707B at Farnborough, in 1951.

On 4 September 1949, the first Avro 707, VX784, performed its maiden flight from RAF Boscombe Down, with Squadron Leader Samuel Eric Esler, DFC, AE at the controls. Two days later, it was statically displayed at the Farnborough Airshow. However, testing with the first prototype was cut shortly when, on 30 September 1949, it crashed near Blackbushe during a test flight, killing Esler. The loss of the first prototype led to the construction of the second prototype being temporarily halted while the design was re-examined, leading to several refinements being implemented.

The next prototype, VX790, renamed the 707B, had a longer nose, different cockpit canopy, a wing of different (51°) sweep and a longer nose wheel leg to provide the high angle of incidence required by deltas for landing and take off. The Avro 707B was given the same dorsal engine intake as the first prototype, although this was later modified to a NACA design. It first flew on 6 September 1950; the aircraft quickly proved to be relatively docile in flight. Both the 707 and 707B were largely flown to test low speed characteristics.

The third aircraft, designated 707A, WD280 was built for higher speed testing. Experience with the dorsal intake of the earlier 707 and 707B had shown that as speed increased, the cockpit induced turbulence which interrupted the intake airflow, thus the intakes were repositioned to the wing roots. It was not designed for supersonic flight as it was felt this would necessitate both power-operated flight controls and far greater engine power. When the Vulcan appeared, it looked very much like an enlarged 707A. Later, this 707A was used to test the compound leading edge sweep subsequently used on all Vulcans. Although the first Vulcan prototype was already flying, a second 707A WZ736 was produced to speed the development programme. It made its maiden fight on 20 February 1953.

The final variant was the two-seat 707C; originally four examples were ordered by the RAF with the intention of conducting orientation training for flying aircraft with delta wing configurations using the type. The 707C was provisioned with a wider cockpit to accommodate a "side-by-side" seating arrangement and dual flight controls. However, the production order was cancelled; accordingly, only the sole prototype, WZ744, was built. The 707C had its maiden flight on 1 July 1953 and was ultimately employed in other research that did not involve Vulcan development.

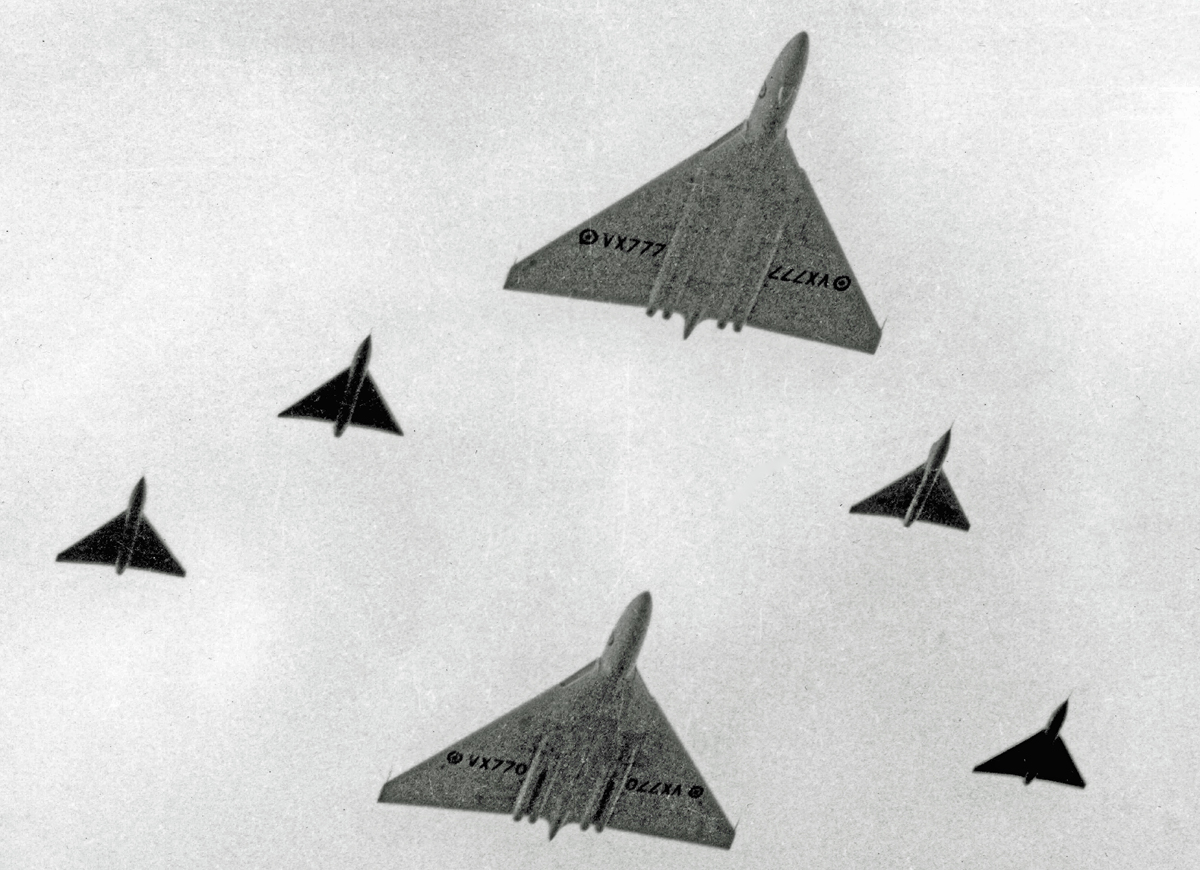
Two Avro 707As, a 707B and a 707C with both Vulcan prototypes at the SBAC Farnborough Air Show in September 1953

Even after the Vulcan development phase was over, the four surviving 707s, in individual bright blue, red, orange and silver (natural metal) colour schemes, continued in use as research aircraft. After the compound sweep investigation, and a period with the Royal Aircraft Establishment (R.A.E) carrying out handling trials with powered controls, the first 707A went to the Aeronautical Research Laboratories in Australia for low-speed delta wing airflow measurements. The second 707A was also at the R.A.E from June 1953 for aerodynamic and later, automatic control investigations.

During September 1952, the Avro 707B joined the R.A.E., becoming one of the aircraft used by the Empire Test Pilots School from January to September 1956, when it was damaged on landing, and broken up at R.A.E. Bedford. The two-seat 707C joined the R.A.E. in January 1956; perhaps its most substantial research contribution was to the development of fly-by-wire control systems, one of the first of their kind, and fitted with a side stick controller. This aircraft was flying with the R.A.E. until September 1966 when it achieved its full airframe time.

The Avro 707s made numerous public appearances at the Farnborough Airshow throughout the 1950s. During 1952, the first prototype Vulcan flew with the 707s A and B and in 1953, the four surviving Avro 707s flew alongside the first two Avro 698 Vulcan prototypes.

== Surviving aircraft ==
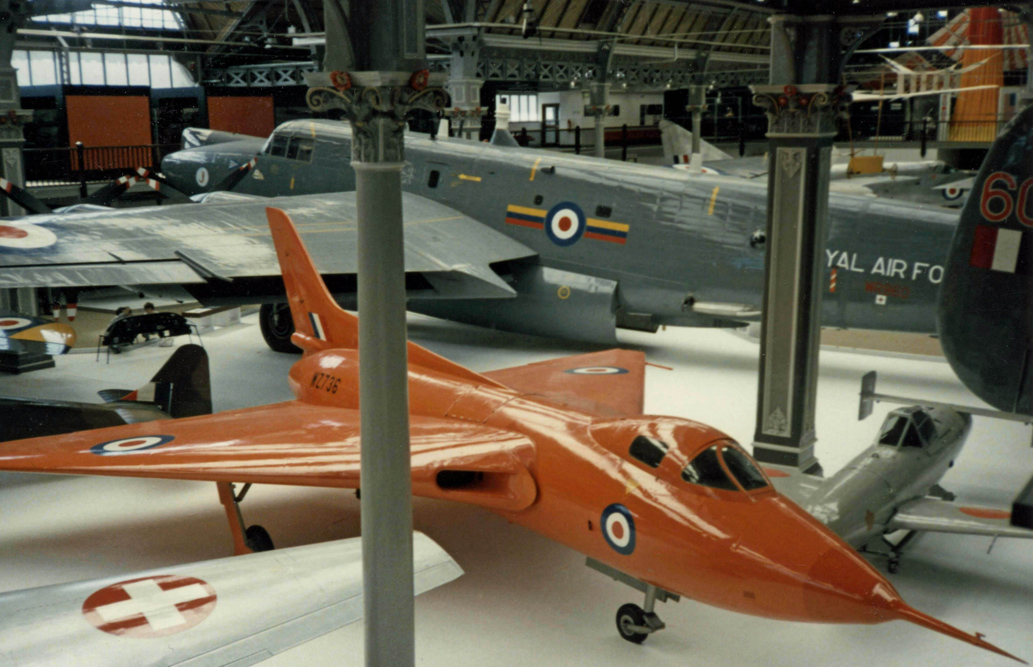
The second Avro 707A WZ736 displayed next to an Avro Shackleton at the Museum of Science and Industry in Manchester in 1985

No Avro 707s are presently airworthy. Both examples of the 707A variant survive. One, WZ736, was preserved in Great Britain at the Museum of Science and Industry in Manchester, but has been transferred to the Boscombe Down Aviation Collection at Old Sarum, while the other, WD280, is preserved in Australia at the RAAF Museum at Point Cook, Victoria. Also surviving in Great Britain is WZ744, the sole 707C prototype. It was previously displayed at the Royal Air Force Museum Cosford near Wolverhampton, before being placed into storage when its space in the Test Flight hall was taken by the British Aerospace EAP. In 2022, the aircraft was moved to the Avro Heritage Museum at Woodford, Cheshire, where it is stored in the former BAe 146/Avro RJ simulator building adjacent to the museum.

== Operators ==
Australia

- Royal Australian Air Force
- Aeronautical Research Laboratories

United Kingdom

- Aeroplane and Armament Experimental Establishment
- Royal Aircraft Establishment

== Specifications (707C) ==
Data from Avro Aircraft since 1908

General characteristics

- Crew: 2
- Length: 42 ft 4 in (12.90 m)
- Wingspan: 34 ft 2 in (10.41 m)
- Height: 11 ft 7 in (3.53 m)
- Wing area: 420 sq ft (39 m^{2})
- Airfoil: NACA 0010 mod
- Gross weight: 10,000 lb (4,536 kg)
- Powerplant: 1 × Rolls-Royce Derwent 8 centrifugal-flow turbojet engine, 3,600 lbf (16 kN) thrust

Performance

- Maximum speed: 464 mph (747 km/h, 403 kn)
- Wing loading: 22.6 lb/sq ft (110 kg/m^{2})
- Thrust/weight: 0.38

== See also ==
Related development

- Avro Vulcan

Aircraft of comparable role, configuration, and era

- Boulton Paul P.111
- Bristol 188
- Convair XF-92
- Dassault Mirage I
- Dassault MD.550 Mystere-Delta
- English Electric P1A
- Fairey Delta 1
- FMA I.Ae. 37
- Handley Page HP.88
- Saab 210
