= Droop nose (aeronautics) =

Foremost tip of an aircraft that improves runway visibility

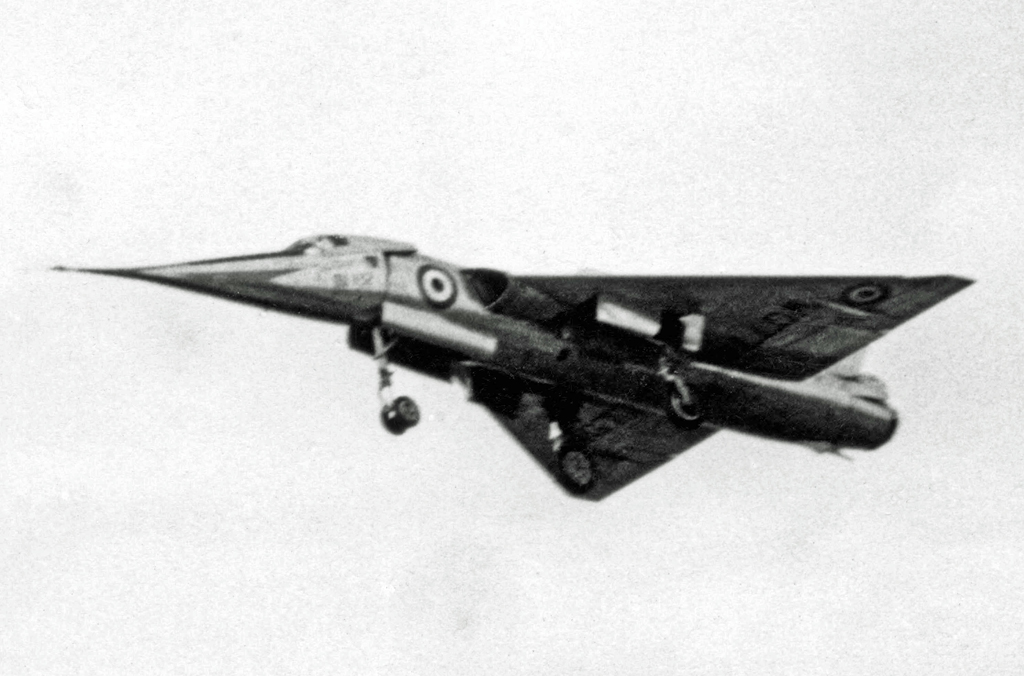
The Fairey Delta 2 high-speed experimental aircraft, which had a droop nose that included its cockpit

The droop nose is a feature fitted to a small number of aircraft types so the nose of the aircraft can be lowered during takeoff and landing to improve the pilot's view of the ground below. This feature is used with a very-low aspect ratio wing such as a delta wing. It is installed in aircraft capable of supersonic speeds but is lowered only during low-speed operation such as takeoff and landing.

Droop noses have typically been installed on supersonic airliners such as Concorde and the Tupolev Tu-144; and high-speed experimental aircraft, such as the record-breaking Fairey Delta 2 and the Sukhoi T-4 strategic bomber.

== History ==
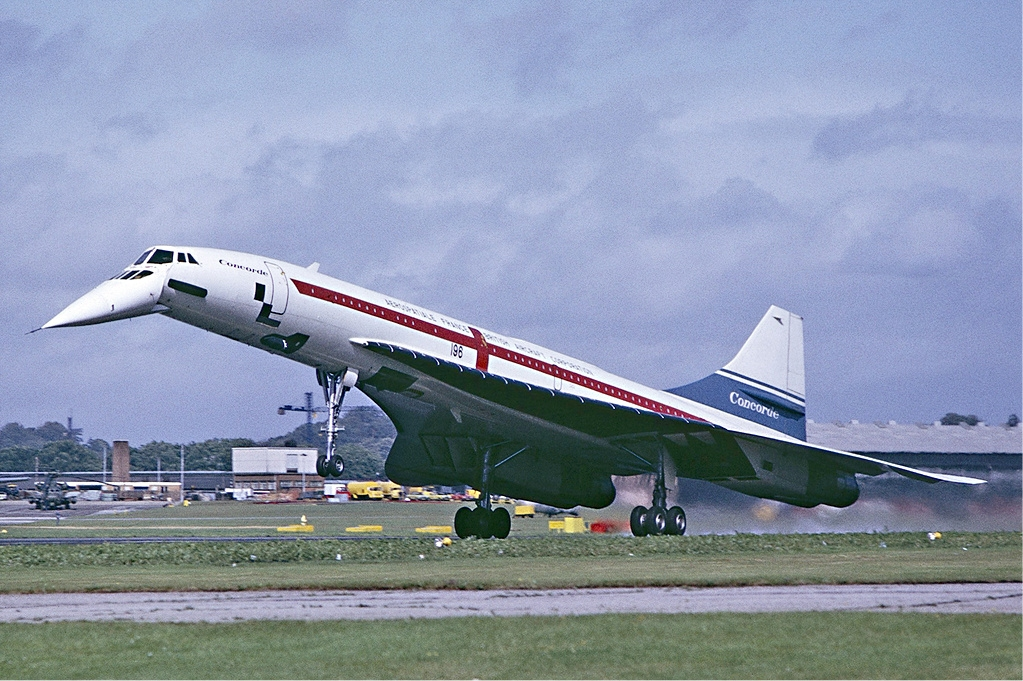
Concorde prototype just prior to landing; note the droop nose

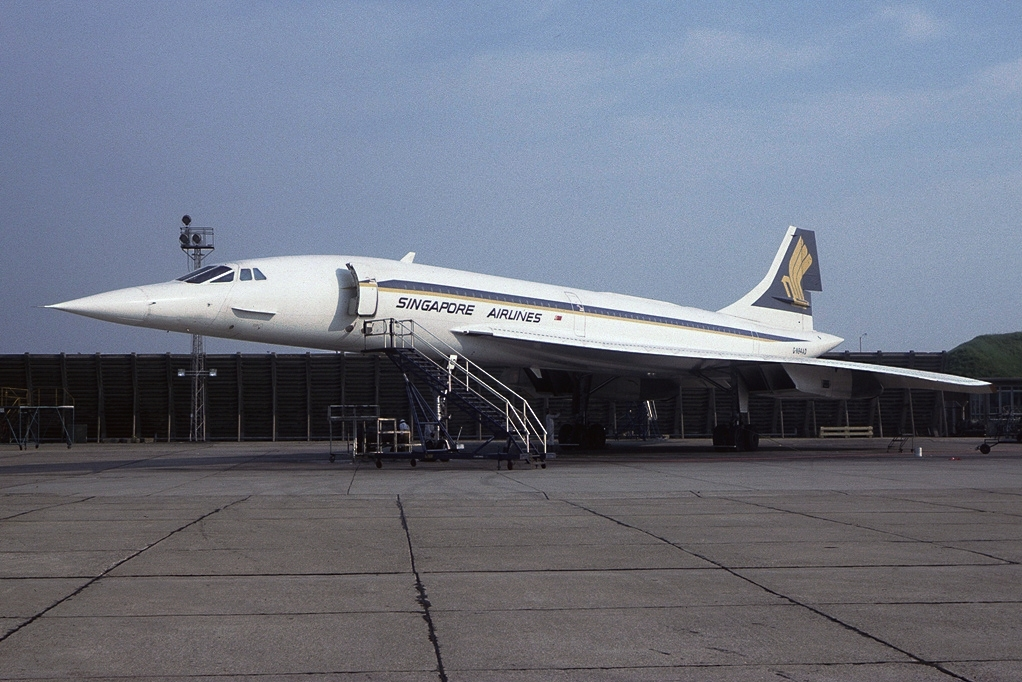
British Airways Concorde in Singapore Airlines livery at Heathrow Airport; note the raised nose

The first supersonic delta to receive a drooped nose was the Fairey Delta 2, a British experimental high-speed aircraft. Nicknamed "Droop Snoot," the Delta 2 featured a relatively long tapered nose, which smoothly flowed into its cylindrical cross-section fuselage, to generate a high level of aerodynamic efficiency. It was recognised that such a lengthy nose would negatively impact the pilot's forward vision during landing, take-off and ground movements; thus, to retain the aerodynamically optimised nose cone while also providing adequate downwards visibility, the drooped nose was devised. Accordingly, the nose section of the Delta 2, including the cockpit, could be drooped by 10° using a hydraulically actuated mechanism. A similar arrangement was subsequently adopted on Concorde.

The Delta 2 soundly demonstrated its favourable high-speed performance qualities during flight testing; rapidly proving to be faster than any other British-built aircraft in existence of that time. On 10 March 1956, the Fairey Delta 2 broke the world airspeed record, raising it to 984 knots (1,132 mph; 1,811 km/h; Mach 1.73). Thus, the Delta 2 became the first aircraft to exceed 1,000 miles per hour (1,600 km/h). Around this time, Fairey sought to produce a straightforward fighter derivative of the Delta 2 that retained many of its features, with efforts largely centering around Operational Requirement F.155. On 1 April 1957, Fairey were informed by officials within the Ministry of Supply that their proposals were the favourite to meet Operational Requirement F.155. However, on 4 April 1957, Duncan Sandys, the Minister of Defence, announced the effective termination of nearly all fighter aircraft development for the RAF, instantly removing the F.155 requirement.

The Delta 2 became a key development platform for what would later be known as Concorde, an early supersonic airliner, which harnessed a cutting-edge ogee or ogival delta wing design. It was decided to convert one of the two Delta 2 aircraft into a testbed for the ogival wing shape. Re-designated as the BAC 221, much of the airframe apart from the wing remained unaltered, the droop nose being one of the features that was carried over. The BAC 221 was used for varied flight testing from 1964 until 1973, after which it was placed on public display.

Concorde was furnished with a droop nose which was developed and manufactured at BAC Hurn, Dorset, UK, which also developed and manufactured additional components including the cockpit visors under contract by Marshall's of Cambridge, by a team led by Norman Harry OBE. Needing to endure temperatures in excess of 100 °C (210 °F) at supersonic flight, the nose window and visor glass were developed by Triplex. The droop nose enabled the airliner to switch between being streamlined to reduce drag for optimal aerodynamic efficiency and not obstructing the pilot's view during taxi, take-off, and landing operations.

Concorde's droop nose was accompanied by a moving transparent visor that retracted into the nose prior to being lowered. When the nose was raised to horizontal, the visor would rise in front of the cockpit windscreen for aerodynamic streamlining. A controller in the cockpit allowed the visor to be retracted and the nose to be lowered to 5° below the standard horizontal position for taxiing and take-off. Following take-off and after clearing the airport, the nose and visor were raised. Prior to landing, the visor was again retracted and the nose lowered to 12.5° below horizontal for maximal visibility. Upon landing, the nose was raised to the 5° position to avoid the possibility of damage. There was also a standby droop system if the main system failed, operated from the cockpit central console, and as a last resort if both hydraulic systems failed, a lever could be pulled in the cockpit to release the mechanical latches, allowing the nose to fall under gravity to the 12.5° position.

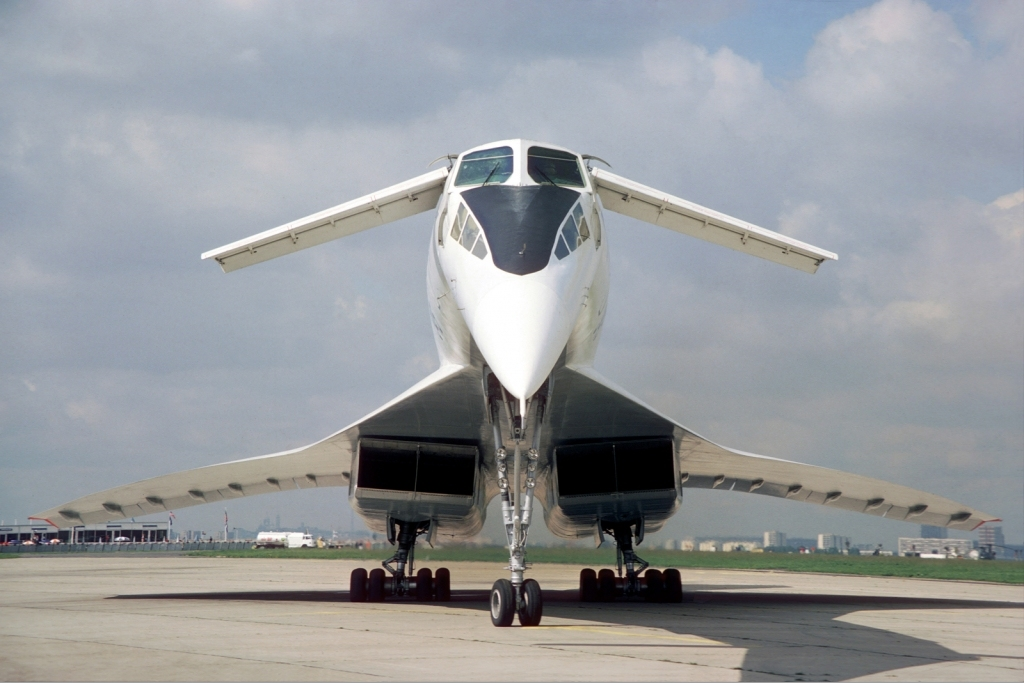
A front-on view of the Tupolev Tu-144 on the ground. Note the deployed retractable canards and lowered droop nose

The Tupolev Tu-144, a contemporary counterpart to Concorde that was developed by the Soviet Union, also featured a droop nose. Its configuration was not identical to that of Concorde however as the visor of the Tu-144 was fixed to the nose. The Tu-144 exhibited a noticeable tendency for the nose to pitch downward, which was cancelled out via the addition of retractable canards that would deploy when the nose was lowered; the landing speed of the Tu-144s was around 170-180 knots (192-207 mph; 315-333 km/h), which remained higher than that of Concorde.

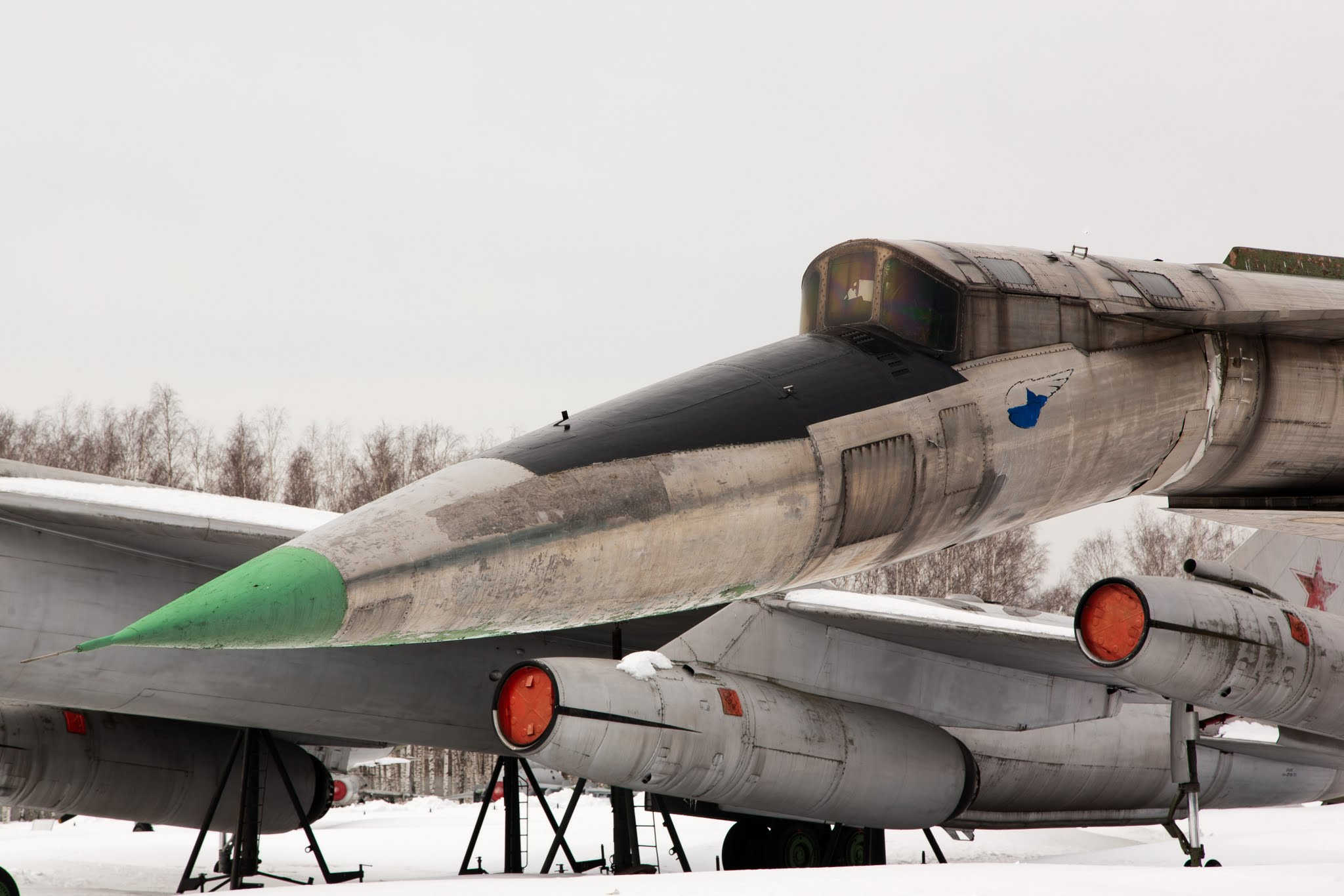
Sukhoi T-4 with lowered droop nose

The Soviet Union also developed a prototype Mach 3 strategic bomber, the Sukhoi T-4, that functioned as the Soviet counterpart to America's North American XB-70 Valkyrie. The T-4 featured a sizable droop nose, which completely covered the cockpit windscreen when raised; a periscope was provided for the pilots to obtain forward visibility.

== See also ==
- Nose cone design
