= Bristol Aerojet =

Joint venture between Bristol Aeroplane Company of the UK and Aerojet General of the US

Bristol Aerojet (BAJ) was a joint venture between the Bristol Aeroplane Company of the United Kingdom and Aerojet General of the US begun in 1959 using the existing factory at Banwell near Weston super Mare, England.

== History ==
=== Banwell aircraft factory 1941-59 ===
Built in 1941 under the authority of the Minister of Aircraft Production, the works was operated by the Bristol Aeroplane Company to build and repair Bristol Beaufort and Bristol Beaufighter torpedo fighter-bombers and Hawker Tempest fighters. After the war the company used the works to build pre-fab houses and schools until the mid-fifties, and then to manufacture rocket-motors required by the Cold War.

=== Bristol/Aerojet technical collaboration ===
Discussions with Aerojet of California USA took place aimed at exploiting the varied rocket-making skills of the two companies, and in 1959 the Banwell works became Bristol Aerojet (BAJ), with a board chaired by Sir Reginald Verdon-Smith of Bristol Aeroplane Company, with Dan Kimball leading the Aerojet representation. Co-operation began with the Blue Water lorry-launched battlefield nuclear missile, but the Blue Water project was cancelled in 1962, and so the MoS had no application for the polyurethane propellant which was promoted by Aerojet. BAJ Banwell concentrated on development of improved rocket motor cases and their materials, and here Aerojet assistance was valuable. A contract was executed for 5,500 motor cases for the Martin 'Bullpup' missile for Nato. Gosling (for Bloodhound), Retriever (Sea Slug), 3000 Sealyham (Sea Cat), and Troy (Rapier) motor cases were built under the Design Authority of the Rocket Propulsion Establishment Westcott, a Ministry of Supply establishment. With the next project, Blackcap, BAJ became Design Authority, and its manufacture featured electron beam welding allowing assembly of fully machined components. At the end of the Sixties BAJ developed the Waxwing apogee-stage motor for the Black Arrow rocket which was used to put the Prospero telecommunications satellite in orbit in 1971

=== Financial problems 1970 to 1984 ===
In 1970 Dan Kimball retired from the Board of BAJ, and thereafter Aerojet became only a financial partner, and after BAJ's subsidiary SORTRAC, a mechanical handling firm, went bankrupt, Aerojet refused to agree to capital reconstruction. The Bristol Aeroplane Company's operations – along with the majority of British aircraft and aero-engine manufacture – had been restructured at Government insistence during the 1960s and its half-share in BAJ had passed to Rolls-Royce Ltd, which in 1971 was effectively bankrupt and subsequently nationalised, resulting in restrictions being placed on BAJ by the Receiver. Ron Howarth was appointed managing director at Banwell, and supervised withdrawal from several activities considered high-risk such as nuclear engineering and re-focussed on Troy cases for Rapier missiles, sounding rockets, and very large contracts from RPE Westcott on the Chevaline project. However, the nuclear team survived, and began new work for the Admiralty.

The receivership following the Rolls-Royce crash eventually resulted in 1979 in BAJ being sold to Vickers Ltd, while business continued with production of Hoopoe and Blackcap motors as well as Chevaline. However, at this time the incoming Thatcher Government reviewed Ministry research establishments and promoted a more industrial role for them, undermining the arrangements under which BAJ had acted as contractor to the rocket establishments. Vickers therefore downgraded their commitment to BAJ and sold the firm in 1984 to a management buy-out from the Crowther Dash consortium.

=== Independence and diversification ===
The new BAJ Ltd operated as five divisions - Rockets, Coatings, Naval Systems, Composites and Stored Energy, and made sales of £13.5 million in its first year, lasting as an independent company until 1987 when it was sold to Meggitt Holdings plc. At this time the freehold of the Banwell site, leased for 21 years in 1964 from the Government at £20,000 a year, was being negotiated and it was actually acquired on 29 April 1988. The workforce was then 463, but with reduced prospects for rocket production it went down to 337 during the year.

=== Closure ===
With the disintegration of the USSR after 1989, it was agreed that rocket work should be sold to Royal Ordnance, and the transfer was signed on 28 June 1991. Fewer than 200 employees remained on the Banwell site, and the main production was via the Coatings activity, providing a range of both Thermally Sprayed and Electroplated (Tribomet©) coatings for both aerospace and industrial applications. Particular success was gained in later years via the development of a novel plated turbine abrasive tip coatings which helped with the reduction of clearance between the turbine blade and casing in a typical gas turbine engine. After a period 1993-6 when the Bristol Aero Collection occupied Shop No 1, the works were finally closed and Meggitt Aerospace moved elsewhere in Weston super Mare finally selling the Coatings business to Praxair Surface Technologies. The factory was demolished in October 1998 by Wimpey Ltd, to be replaced by 173 new houses in the hamlet of Elborough.

== Rocket products ==
- Bullpup booster for ramjet test vehicles
- Rocket motor casings for Martin Bullpup air-launched missile
- Gosling booster for Bristol Bloodhound and Sea Slug missile
- Retriever (developed Gosling) for Sea Slug
- Deerhound and Foxhound sustainer for Sea Slug (design by Summerfield Research Station)
- Retriever sustainer motor for Sea Slug
- Sealyham motor for Sea Cat surface-to-air missile (design by SRS)
- Troy motor for Rapier surface-to-air missile (design by SRS)
- Lapwing boost for Petrel sounding rocket
- Skua sounding rocket
- Hoopoe for Skyflash air-to-air missile
- Waxwing motor for Black Arrow third (apogee) stage
- Raven for Skylark sounding rocket
- Rocket components of Chevaline ICBM warhead
- Magpie for de Havilland Firestreak

PERME design

- Albatross sustainer for English Electric Thunderbird
- Bantam for Sea Skua
- Blackcap boost motor for Sea Wolf missile
- Buzzard for Red Dean air-to-air missile project
- Crake for Blowpipe
- Cuckoo for Blue Water and Skylark
