= Roy Dommett =

British aerospace engineer

Roy Dommett CBE
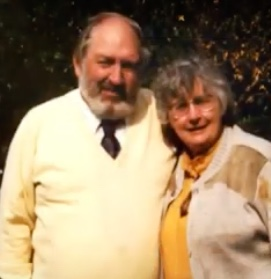
- Roy Dommett, pictured with his wife, after their retirement.
- Born: Roy Leonard Dommett; 25 June 1933; Southampton, England
- Died: 2 November 2015 (aged 82); Carshalton
- Education: Itchen Grammar School; University of Bristol
- Known for: Black Knight (rocket); Blue Streak (missile); Black Arrow; Polaris; Trident (missile); UK Chief Missile Scientist
- Awards: Commander of the Order of the British Empire; Royal Aeronautical Society Silver Medal; English Folk Dance and Song Society Gold Badge
- Scientific career
- Fields: Rocket science
- Workplaces: Royal Aircraft Establishment, Farnborough; Space Department, MOD; Defence Evaluation and Research Agency

Roy Leonard Dommett CBE (25 June 1933 – 2 November 2015) was a British engineer and rocket scientist, and the United Kingdom's Chief Missile Scientist, who for many years led the United Kingdom's research and development of both ballistic missiles and space rockets for the delivery of satellites into orbit. In retirement he lived in Hampshire.

== Private life and family ==
Roy Leonard Dommett, a descendant of an old East Devon family, was born on 25 June 1933, in Itchen, Southampton. His parents were Leonard Frank Dommett (1907-1996), a painter and decorator, and cook and housekeeper Rose Eveline (1909-2006), née Diaper.

He was educated at Itchen Grammar School and Bristol University, gaining a first in aeronautical engineering in 1954. Employed by the Royal Aircraft Establishment at Farnborough from 1953 to 2000, while it became DRA and DERA, he retired before it divided into Qinetiq and Dstl. During this time and after his retirement he lived in Fleet, Hampshire.

He was married in November 1955 to Marguerite Patricia Dawson whom he had met at school, and they had seven sons and one daughter. Dommett's first experience with rocket technology was witnessing the arrival of a V-2 at Southampton. His family had links with the aviation industry, as his father had served in the Royal Air Force, and his uncle worked at the Supermarine works in Southampton on the Spitfire.

Dommett died on 2 November 2015. Two weeks later he was featured as the lead obituary on BBC Radio 4's tribute programme Last Word. He was survived by his wife Marguerite, who died in 2020, and his seven sons; his daughter predeceased him.

Distant relatives of Dommett include Alfred Domett, fourth Premier of New Zealand (1862-1863), and Admiral William Domett, who served in the American Revolutionary War, French Revolutionary War, and the Napoleonic Wars.

== Pioneering developments ==
Dommett initially specialised in aerodynamic heating and supersonic flows. He worked on the re-entry vehicle design for Blue Streak, and was more deeply involved in the design and analysis of the Black Knight re-entry requirements. Whilst in the Space Department he was the British member of the ELDO Aerodynamics Committee on EUROPA and a contributor to the design of the Black Arrow.

He moved to the weapons department in 1967 for the Polaris improvement studies which culminated in KHG793/Chevaline in 1970 with responsibility for the new delivery system, and was given a Special Merit promotion in 1980. He led on some outstanding UK issues with Trident II and then on the counter measure aspects in the UK contributions to the US SDI studies. He attempted to initiate a number of small studies that would have developed UK system understanding, but funding was not available. In all, he contributed in some way to 32 projects. For ten years he was a member of a Research Advisory Council supporting the Chief Scientific Officer.

== Chief Missile Scientist ==
Dommett worked at both the RAE and the rocket testing station of Saunders-Roe at High Down on the Isle of Wight, where the United Kingdom's first indigenous rocketry system Black Knight was developed. Dommett was designated 'Chief Missile Scientist' on the key projects Black Knight (nuclear rocket), Blue Streak (nuclear missile), and Black Arrow (satellite launcher). Despite the enormous success of all these projects, all were later abandoned on grounds of expense. To date the United Kingdom is the only country to have successfully developed and then abandoned a satellite launch capability. All other countries to have developed such capability have retained it either through their own space programme, or in the case of France through its involvement in the Ariane programme. The nuclear missile programme was abandoned in favour of buying in the American Polaris system; Dommett was the Chief Missile Scientist on the programme of developing Polaris for British use, known as the Chevaline project.

== Later working life ==
Roy Dommett did, in his later years, voice the regret and upset felt in the British rocket industry by its professionals, following the decision of the British Government to cut funding, and terminate the research. Following the cessation of the British independent space programme, and independent rocket development, Dommett continued to hold a senior role in British defence. From 1982 he was Chief Scientist for the Special Weapons Department, and then a Principal Consultant on Ballistic Missiles for the United Kingdom Ministry of Defence's Defence Evaluation and Research Agency, after his formal retirement.

Dommett was almost unique in the UK in having begun work on Black Knight and Blue Streak and continued his career working on Polaris, Black Arrow, the Polaris Improvement programme and Trident, which together constitute all of the major UK missile programmes.

During the final years of his life Dommett was one of a hundred leading United Kingdom scientists and engineers engaged by the British Library to document their ground-breaking work in a series of archives and filmed interviews. The programme, entitled An Oral History of British Science includes recordings of Dommett's interviews, which can be accessed through the British Library's Voices of Science system.

== Decorations ==
For his pioneering research and development work, Roy Dommett received the Royal Aeronautical Society Silver Medal in 1991. Later the same year he was created a Commander of the Order of the British Empire (CBE). In 2004 the British Rocketry Oral History Programme Conference met in Godalming and made a special 'lifetime achievement' presentation to Dommett, including an evening's biographical presentation through the eyes of family members and professional colleagues.

== Morris dancing ==
Besides being honoured for his groundbreaking scientific work, Roy Dommett was one of the leading figures in the English Morris Dancing tradition, and a touring lecturer on its history and techniques. He was a much-published author on the subject, especially in the form of articles in folk dance journals. He was a founder of the Farnborough Morris in 1954, and danced by invitation with the Traditional Abingdon side from 1960 to 1972. He ran a series of successful instructionals at Halsway Manor, Somerset, at Boys Town, St Athlan, Barry and then at Laines Barn, Wantage. In 1976 he worked as a musician with a new generation of women morris sides including; Fleur de Lys, Goldalming, Minden Rose at Alton and latterly Fleet Morris. He has also toured and instructed in the USA, Australia and New Zealand.

Although he was well-known through English morris dancing circles, few of his fellow morris-dancers were ever aware of his professional commitments, until towards the end of his life the passage of time allowed some details to become public. During his working career Dommett attended a morris dancing event near Birmingham, unaware until his arrival that the dancing was taking place at a Campaign for Nuclear Disarmament rally. The event was monitored by the UK Security Service, and on his return to work the following week Dommett was interviewed by the Royal Aircraft Establishment security officer, and obliged to explain his presence at the rally.

On his retirement from active Morris Dancing a cake was baked in the form of a life-sized model of Dommett's head, which remains a talking-point in British Morris circles. In retirement he still occasionally performed on the accordion. His work in the field was recognised by the award of the Jubilee Medal and then, in 2001, the Gold Badge of the English Folk Dance and Song Society. In the final years of his life, despite over ten years of very poor health, he made attempts to catalogue and summarise his extensive knowledge of morris.

== Stave dancing ==
In addition to Morris dancing, Dommett was instrumental in the revival of stave dancing, a style of country dance local to the south-west of England, which he submitted originated during the “club walks” of nineteenth century friendly societies. Beginning with a series of talks at Sidmouth Folk Festival during the 1980s, he single-handedly popularised the dance style and continued to teach and promote it through workshops and lectures.
