= Orba (satellite) =

British experimental satellite

- Mission type: Atmospheric
- Operator: RAE
- Mission duration: Failed to orbit

Start of mission
- Launch date: 2 September 1970, 00:34:05 UTC
- Rocket: Black Arrow R2
- Launch site: Woomera LA-5B

Orbital parameters
- Reference system: Geocentric
- Regime: Low Earth
- Epoch: Planned

Orba, also known as X-2, was intended to be the first satellite launched by a British rocket. It was launched at 00:34 GMT on 2 September 1970, atop a Black Arrow rocket from Launch Area 5B at Woomera, but failed to reach orbit after the second stage of the carrier rocket shut down 13 seconds early. Orba was built from spare parts due to funding restrictions, and was to have been used to measure upper atmosphere density by monitoring the decay of its orbit.

== See also ==
- Prospero X-3
- Timeline of artificial satellites and space probes
