= Black Arrow =

British satellite carrier rocket developed during the 1960s

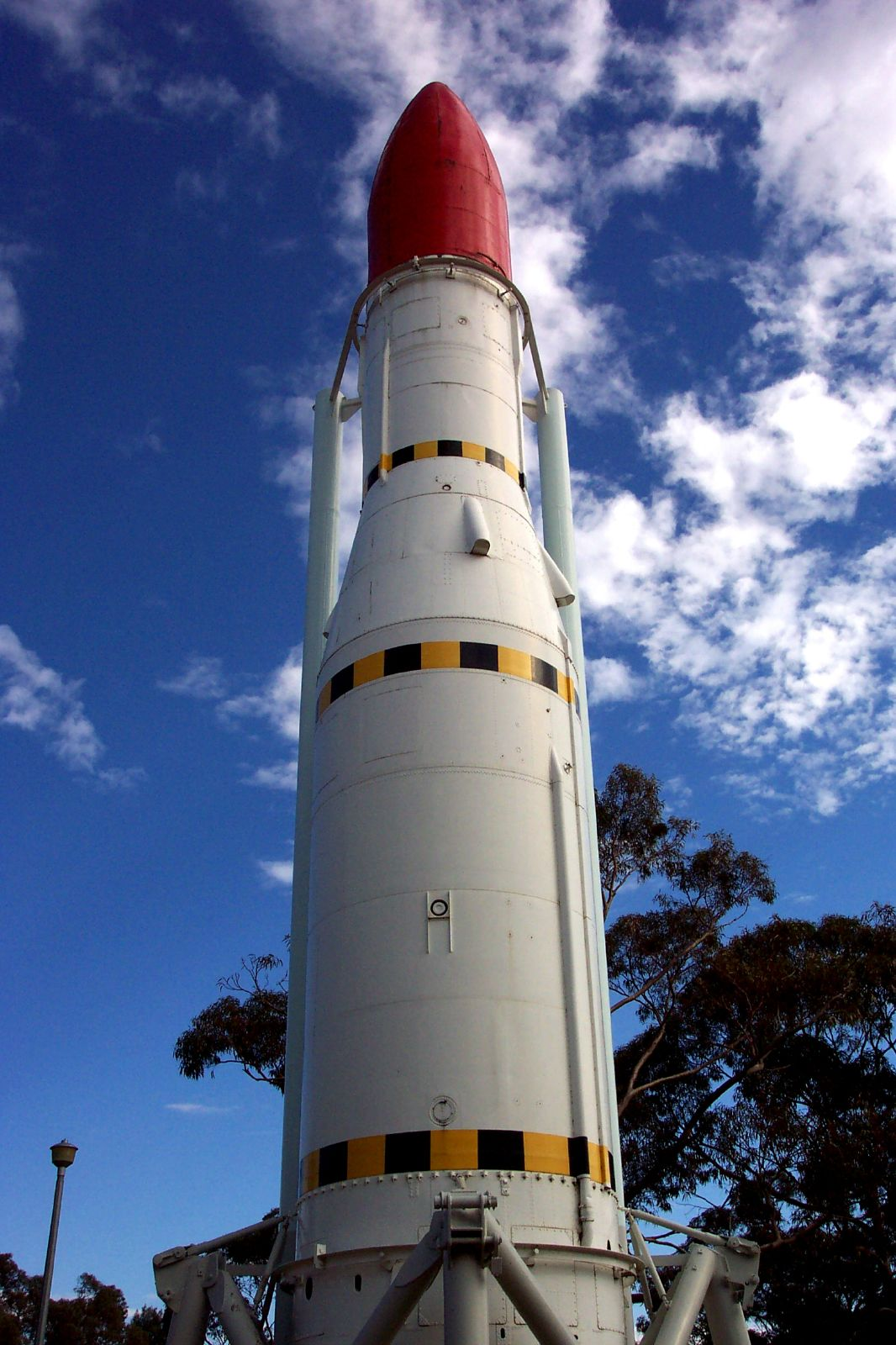
- A mockup of the Black Arrow in the rocket park at Woomera.
- Function: Carrier rocket
- Manufacturer: Royal Aircraft Establishment; Westland Aircraft
- Country of origin: United Kingdom

Size
- Height: 13 metres (43 ft)
- Diameter: 2 metres (6 ft 7 in)
- Mass: 18,130 kilograms (39,970 lb)
- Stages: 3

Capacity

Payload to LEO
- Altitude: 220 km (140 mi)
- Mass: 135 kilograms (298 lb)

Payload to LEO
- Altitude: 500 km (310 mi)
- Mass: 102 kilograms (225 lb)

Launch history
- Status: Retired
- Launch sites: Woomera LA-5B
- Total launches: 2 (+2 suborbital)
- Success(es): 1 (+1 suborbital)
- Failure: 1 (+1 suborbital)
- First flight: 27 June 1969
- Last flight: 28 October 1971

First stage
- Powered by: Gamma 8
- Maximum thrust: 256.4 kilonewtons (57,600 lb_{f})
- Specific impulse: 265 seconds (2.60 km/s)
- Burn time: 131 seconds
- Propellant: RP-1/HTP

Second stage
- Powered by: Gamma 2
- Maximum thrust: 68.2 kilonewtons (15,300 lb_{f})
- Specific impulse: 265 seconds (2.60 km/s)
- Burn time: 116 seconds
- Propellant: RP-1/HTP

Third stage – Waxwing
- Powered by: 1 solid
- Maximum thrust: 27.3 kilonewtons (6,100 lb_{f})
- Specific impulse: 278 seconds (2.73 km/s)
- Burn time: 55 seconds
- Propellant: Solid

Black Arrow, officially capitalised BLACK ARROW, was a British liquid-fuelled three-stage expendable launch system. In 1971 Black Arrow's fourth final flight placed the Prospero satellite into low Earth orbit, the first and only successful orbital launch conducted by the United Kingdom.

Black Arrow originated from studies by the Royal Aircraft Establishment for carrier rockets based on the earlier Black Knight rocket; the project was authorised by the British government in late 1964. Development of Black Arrow was largely performed by the prime contractor, the British aerospace company Saunders-Roe, and later undertaken by Westland Aircraft as the result of a merger. Both the first and second stage engines were produced by Bristol Siddeley at their factory in Ansty, Warwickshire. Assembly of the first and second stages was carried out at East Cowes on the Isle of Wight. Once manufactured, each Black Arrow vehicle was transported by ship to Australia prior to being launched from the RAAF Woomera Range Complex.

Black Arrow was a three-stage rocket, fuelled by RP-1 paraffin (kerosene) and high-test peroxide, a concentrated form of hydrogen peroxide (85% hydrogen peroxide + 15% water). While the first two stages featured thrust vectoring to provide attitude control, the third stage did not have an attitude control system, and instead relied upon spin stabilization along with a reaction control system. The first stage was designed to be compatible with Blue Streak, as well as to be interchangeable with Coralie. Furthermore, several derivatives of Black Arrow were proposed to provide for increased payload capacity.

A total of four launches of Black Arrow were performed between 1969 and 1971, the first two being demonstration flights to prove the launcher's capabilities. While the first and third flights were failures, the second and fourth flights were successful. After Prospero's launch, British officials decided to discontinue the programme in favour of using American Scout rockets instead, the Ministry of Defence having calculated this option to be cheaper than continuing with Black Arrow. The final Black Arrow to be completed, which never flew, has been preserved intact at the Science Museum, London, along with the flight spare for the Prospero satellite.

== Development ==
Black Arrow originated from a Royal Aircraft Establishment proposal for a rocket capable of placing a 317-pound (144 kg) payload into low Earth orbit, in order to test systems designed for larger spacecraft. In the autumn of 1964, the programme was authorised by Conservative Aviation Minister Julian Amery. Then, following a general election in October, the incoming Labour government put the project on hold to reduce expenditure. Following another election, the British government approved the continuation of the programme with several modifications, including the reduction of the test programme from five to three launches. The maiden launch was set for 1968.

Initial development was conducted by the British aerospace manufacturer Saunders-Roe, which merged into Westland Aircraft in 1964. Westland was subsequently the prime contractor for the Black Arrow, and assembled the first and second stages at East Cowes on the Isle of Wight, later testing the rockets from the 1950s up until the rocket launch on 28 October 1971. The British powerplant specialist Bristol Siddeley produced the first and second stage engines at a factory in Ansty, Warwickshire. The engines were test fired at the factory before being shipped to the Isle of Wight, where they were integrated into the rocket and the first stage engines were fired again at High Down. Bristol Aerojet produced the third stage in Somerset, while the Explosives Research and Development Establishment produced its solid propellant in Waltham Abbey, Essex. The Rocket Propulsion Establishment, based in Westcott, Buckinghamshire, was responsible for the design and integration of the stage.

The majority of the technology and systems used on Black Arrow had already been developed or flight-proven on the Black Knight rocket, or the Blue Steel missile. Black Arrow was designed to reuse as much technology from the earlier programmes as possible in order to reduce costs, and simplify the development process. Many senior staff of the Black Knight programme transferred directly to Black Arrow, including the Chief Missile Scientist Roy Dommett, the Chief Design Engineer Ray Wheeler, and the Deputy Chief Engineer John Underwood. Despite this effort, the programme encountered more difficulties and greater costs than had originally been anticipated. This outcome was in no small part due to the austere budget of £3 million per year.

The name Black Arrow came from the Ministry of Supply policy of assigning designations consisting of a colour and a noun, unofficially known as Rainbow Codes, to research programmes conducted by the Armed Forces. Despite this naming convention, the programme was officially a civilian venture. It was unofficially nicknamed the "Lipstick Rocket", as the fairing, which was painted bright red for visibility, made the rocket resemble a tube of lipstick.

== Vehicle ==
Cutaway diagram, showing the positions of fuel and oxidiser tanks, engines, and the third stage inside the fairing.

Black Arrow was a relatively compact launch vehicle, being particularly slender as well as possibly being the shortest rocket ever to place a satellite into orbit. The first and second stages of the Black Arrow were fuelled by RP-1 paraffin (kerosene), burnt using high test peroxide as an oxidiser. Due to the optimum mixture ratio being about 7, a larger oxidiser tank was required compared to many contemporary launch systems. The oxidiser tanks were located below the fuel tanks, following the practice of putting the more dense propellant at the top in order move the centre of gravity higher and make the rocket more stable, when in flight, and thus easier to control. This arrangement had been pioneered by Germany and the United States, whereas the Soviet Union had placed oxidiser tanks above fuel tanks, making it easier to fill the lower tank first.

Thrust vectoring was used to provide attitude control on the first two stages. The eight first stage combustion chambers were arranged in pairs which could gimbal either way along one axis. Two of the pairs were arranged perpendicular to the other two, and when all four pairs were used together, they provided roll, pitch, and yaw control. The second stage had two combustion chambers, which could gimbal along two axes, providing the same level of control. During a coast phase after second stage cut-off, the rocket was controlled by a reaction control system. The third stage did not have an attitude control system, and was instead spin-stabilised. The guidance system used was derived from that of the cancelled BAC TSR-2 bomber.

The first stage was powered by a single Gamma 8 engine, which burned for 127 seconds. The Gamma 8 was an eight-chamber engine, derived from the Gamma 301 engine used on the Black Knight. It was 6.9 metres (23 ft) long, and had a diameter of 2 metres (6 ft 7 in), the same diameter as the French Coralie. Coralie was used as the second stage of the Europa rocket. Black Arrow had the same diameter as Coralie to make it compatible with Blue Streak, which was used as the first stage of Europa. This would have allowed Black Arrow's payload capacity to have been increased, and would also have allowed Britain to use the first stage of Black Arrow as a backup to the Coralie. For this reason, all dimensions in the original specification were given in imperial units except the first stage diameter, which was given in metric units.

The first and second stages were connected by an interstage structure containing four Siskin IB separation and ullage motors, which separated and ignited seven seconds after the first stage had cut off. The interstage separated from the second stage six seconds later. The second stage, which was 2.9 metres (9 ft 6 in) long and measured 1.37 metres (4 ft 6 in) in diameter, was powered by a two-chamber Gamma 2 engine which ignited shortly after the separation motors, and continued to burn for 123 seconds. Three minutes after launch, during the second stage burn, the payload fairing separated.

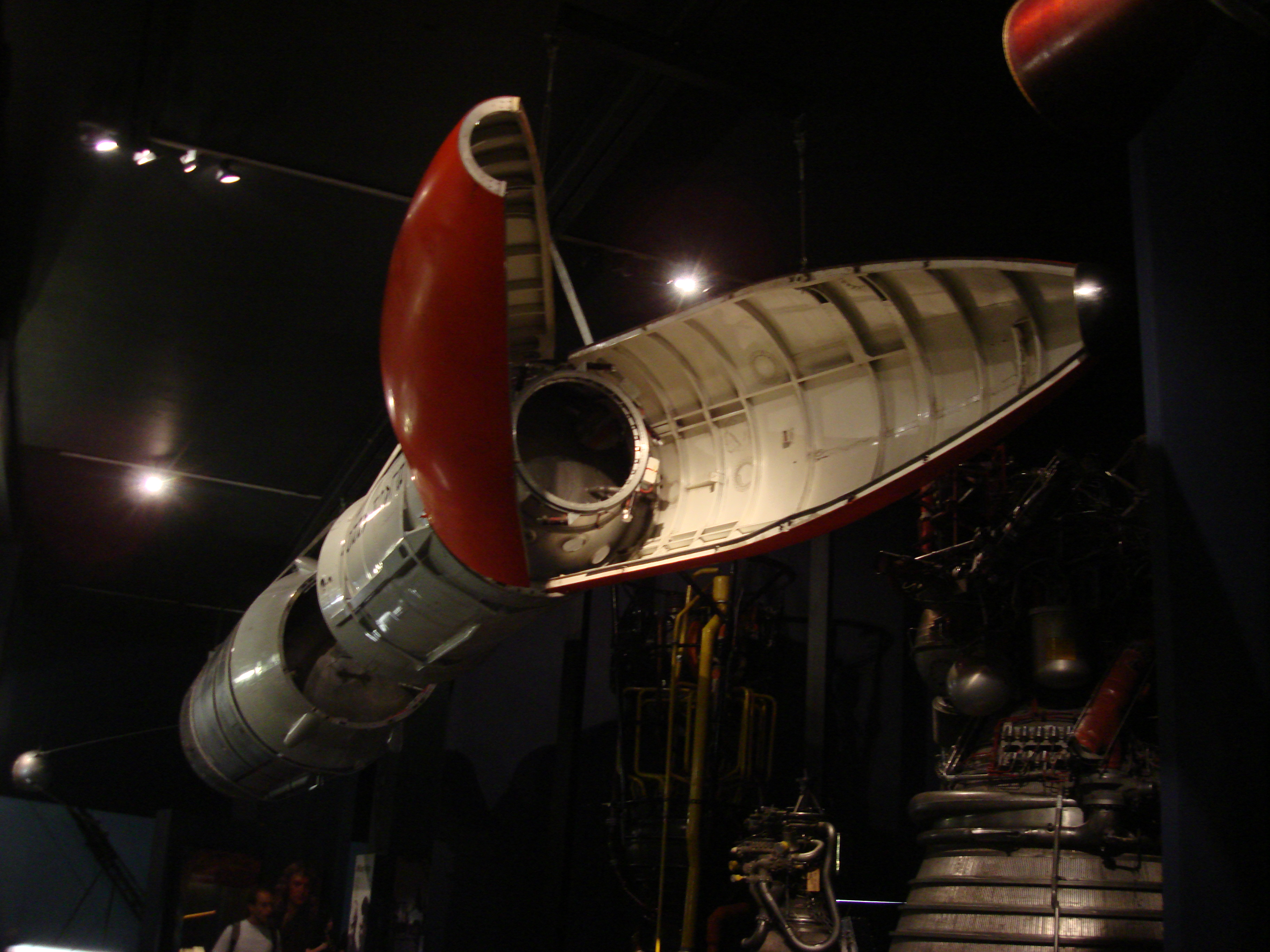
The first two stages and open payload fairing of R4 on display at the Science Museum in London

About 257 seconds into the flight, the second stage cut off, and the rocket entered a coast phase to apogee. Immediately after cut-off, the second stage attitude control system was pressurised. During the coast the correct orientation for third stage separation was maintained by means of the attitude control system. Towards the end of the coast period, the third stage was spun up to a rate of 3 hertz (180 rpm) by means of six Imp rockets. Five seconds later, the third stage separated, and following ten more seconds of coasting, it ignited. The third stage was a Waxwing solid rocket motor, which burned for 55 seconds.

Just over a minute after the third stage had burned out, the payload was released, and gas generators were used to push the spacecraft and spent upper stage apart. The delay between burnout and separation was intended to reduce the risk of recontact between the upper stage and payload due to residual thrust. However, following spacecraft separation on the R3 launch, the upper stage collided with the Prospero satellite, damaging one of the spacecraft's communications antennae. Despite this, the spacecraft was still able to complete its mission successfully. On the R3 launch, the ascent took 710 seconds (11.8 min) from liftoff to spacecraft separation.

Although none were ever built, several derivatives of Black Arrow were also proposed, typically focused upon increasing its payload capacity. In its standard configuration, Black Arrow was not capable of launching some contemporary satellites up to a sufficient altitude to achieve geostationary orbit. Accordingly, one proposal was to add eight Raven solid rocket motors from the Skylark programme to the first stage as booster rockets. Another suggestion was to mount the entire rocket atop a Blue Streak missile, while a third proposal involved replacing the Gamma engines with the more powerful Larch.

== Launches ==
The colour scheme used on all flights except R0, with stripes on the first stage for determining roll angle, and a coloured fairing to increase visibility.

Four Black Arrows were launched between 1969 and 1971. The first two launches were demonstration flights, with battleship third stages and a boilerplate payload. On the maiden flight, an electrical fault caused a pair of first stage combustion chambers to pivot back and forth. Before it cleared the launch pad, the rocket was rolling erratically, and about a minute later it began to disintegrate. After the first stage engine failed, and the rocket began to fall back to earth, it was destroyed by range safety. This initial failure was a considerable blow to the programme, particularly as there were insufficient financial reserves to accommodate a second unsuccessful launch. The second Black Arrow vehicle was returned to Britain for inspection and fixes ahead of the next launch.

The second launch, performed on 4 March 1970, was entirely successful. On 2 September 1970, the third launch of the Black Arrow took place; it was the first all-up launch as well as Britain's first attempt to launch a satellite. This launch failed due to a leak in the second stage oxidiser pressurisation system, which caused it to cut out early. The third stage fired, but the rocket did not reach orbit, and re-entered over the Gulf of Carpentaria. An extensive programme review was conducted in the aftermath of the third launch, which determined that Black Arrow's design had no fundamental flaws and that only minor modifications were required.

The fourth launch, performed on 28 October 1971, successfully orbited the Prospero (before the R2 mission, it was named Puck) satellite, making the United Kingdom the sixth nation to place a satellite into orbit by means of an indigenously developed carrier rocket. The satellite, also known as X-3, was named Prospero after the character Prospero in Shakespeare's The Tempest. The name was chosen as a reference to events in the play, in which Prospero, a sorcerer, gives up his powers. Prior to the cancellation of the Black Arrow programme, the satellite was to be named after Puck from A Midsummer Night's Dream.

All four launches were conducted from Launch Area 5B at the RAAF Woomera Range Complex in Australia, which had previously been used as a test site for the Black Knight rocket. During the development programme, launch sites in Barbados, Uist, and Norfolk were also considered. The launch sites at Uist and Norfolk were rejected because the former was too remote, while there was a risk that a rocket launched from the latter might drop spent stages on an oil rig in the North Sea.

Serial number	Launch date/time (GMT)	Payload	Outcome	Remarks
R0	28 June 1969, 22:58	None	Failure	Suborbital test of first and second stages, thrust vectoring failed
R1	4 March 1970, 21:15	None	Success	Suborbital test of first and second stages
R2	2 September 1970, 00:34	Orba	Failure	Second stage failed to pressurise
R3	28 October 1971, 04:09	Prospero	Success	Successfully reached Earth orbit
R4	Not launched			Preserved at the Science Museum in London

== Cancellation ==
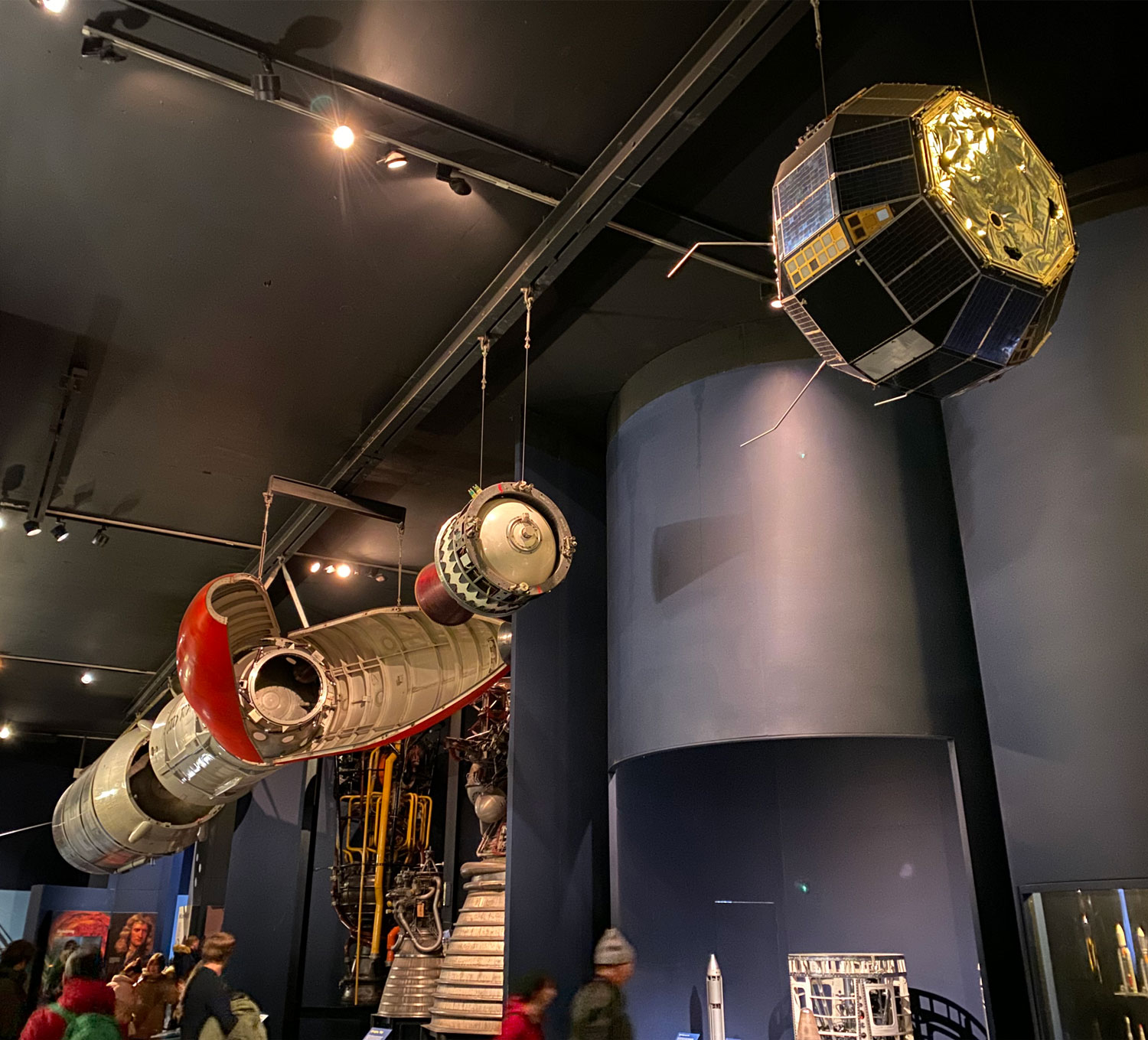
Black Arrow R4 on display in the Science Museum, with the stages and fairing separated, and the flight spare of the Prospero satellite

The Minister of State for Trade and Industry, Frederick Corfield, announced the cancellation of the Black Arrow project in the House of Commons on 29 July 1971. Britain would instead focus its space activities on building satellites and rely on foreign launch vehicles. As the R3 rocket had already been shipped to the launch site, the second stage having arrived three days earlier, permission was given for it to be launched.

The programme was cancelled on economic grounds, as the Ministry of Defence decided that it would be cheaper to use the American Scout rocket, which had a similar payload capacity, for future launches. Prior to the cancellation of Black Arrow, NASA had offered to launch British payloads for free; however, this offer was withdrawn following the decision to cancel Black Arrow.

The final Black Arrow to be completed was R4, which did not fly, and is preserved in the Science Museum, London, along with the flight spare for the Prospero satellite. A replica of the Black Arrow rocket stands in the Rocket Park at Woomera. In addition, the remains of the first stage of Black Arrow R3 were recovered from the Anna Creek cattle station and were displayed in the William Creek Memorial Park. Due to weather and vandalism related damage, the first stage was returned to the United Kingdom in an initiative led by Skyrora to preserve the artefact. It was displayed in Penicuik, Scotland, in early 2019; as of Spring 2024, the rocket is on loan to the Farnborough Air Sciences Trust Museum.

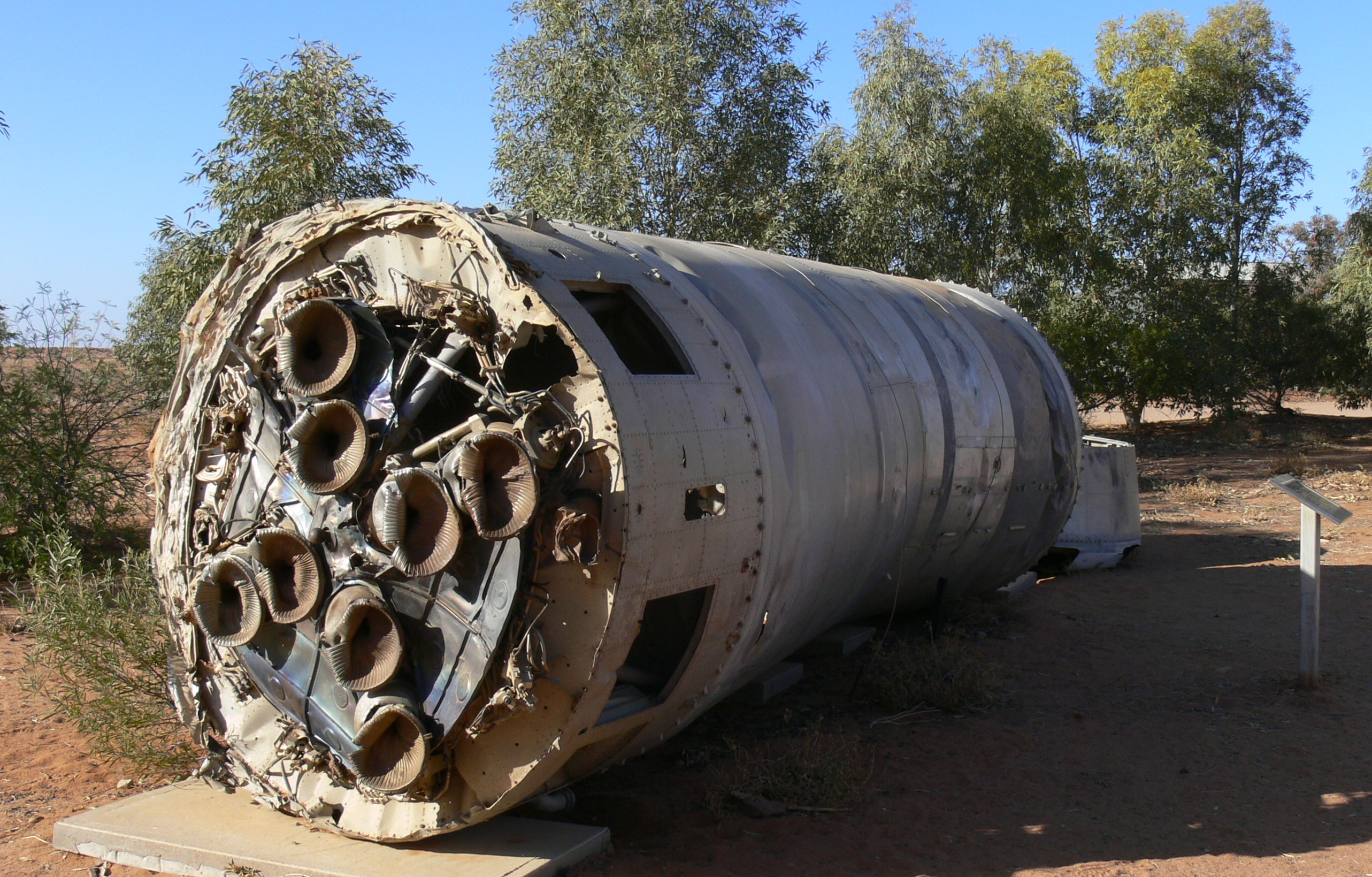
The first stage of Black Arrow R3, on display at William Creek following its return to Earth

The launch facilities at Woomera were demolished within a year of the final flight, and half of the engineers who had worked on the programme were laid off. The X-4 satellite, which had been manifested for launch by Black Arrow R4, was eventually launched on 9 March 1974, by an American Scout D-1 rocket flying from Space Launch Complex 5 at the Vandenberg Air Force Base in California.

As of 2024, the United Kingdom is the only country to have successfully developed and then abandoned a satellite launch capability. All other countries that have developed such a capability have retained it either through their own space programme or, in the case of France, through its involvement in the Ariane programme. However, a second British launch vehicle, the Skyrora, is currently under development.

== See also ==
- Comparison of orbital launchers families
- Comparison of orbital launch systems
- Ariel 1
- British National Space Centre
- Diamant
- Juno I
- Lambda (rocket family)
- Satellite Launch Vehicle
- Sputnik (rocket)
- Black Knight
