= Waxwing (rocket motor) =

British solid-propellant rocket engine

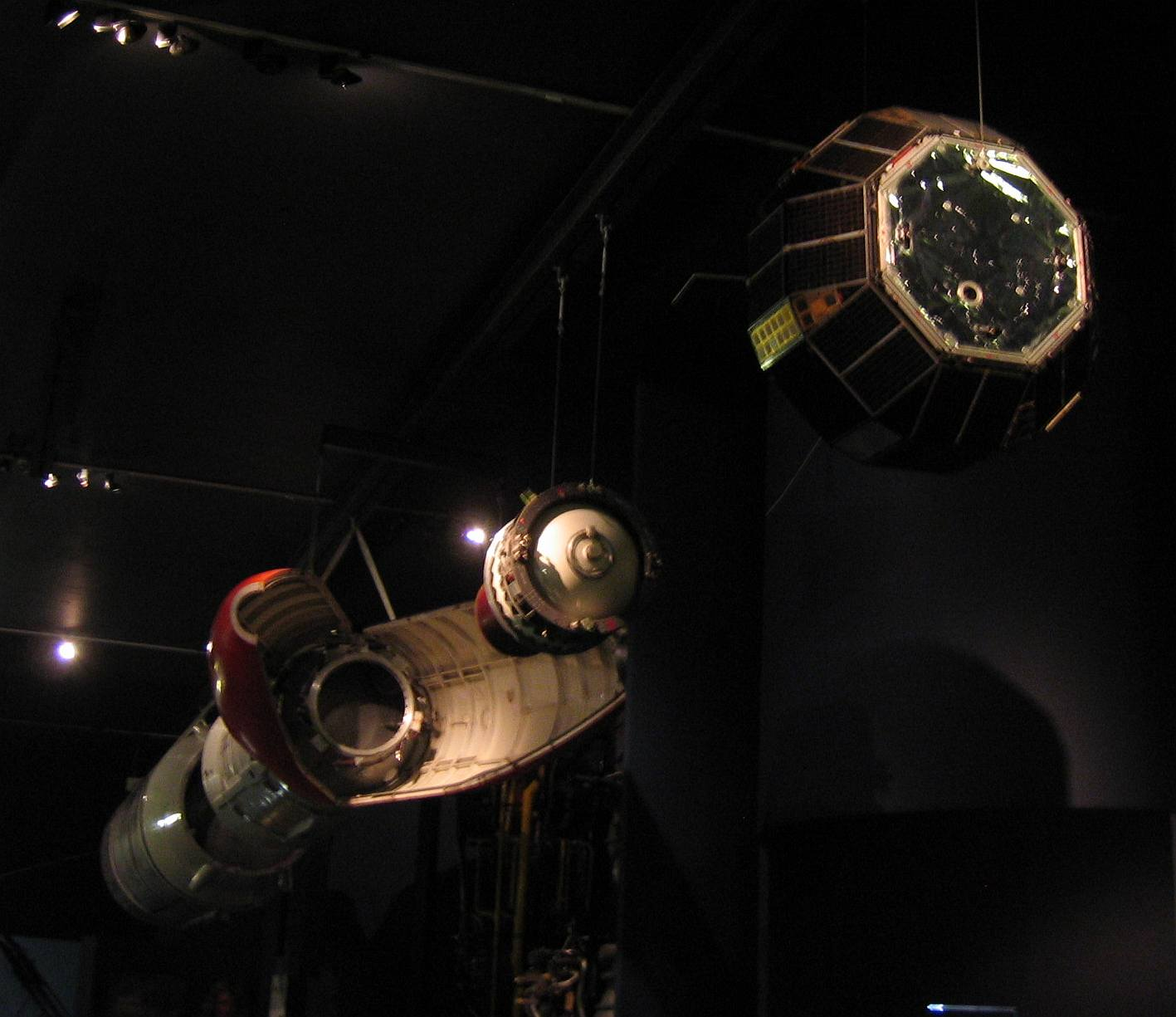
Black Arrow satellite deployment, with Waxwing upper stage.

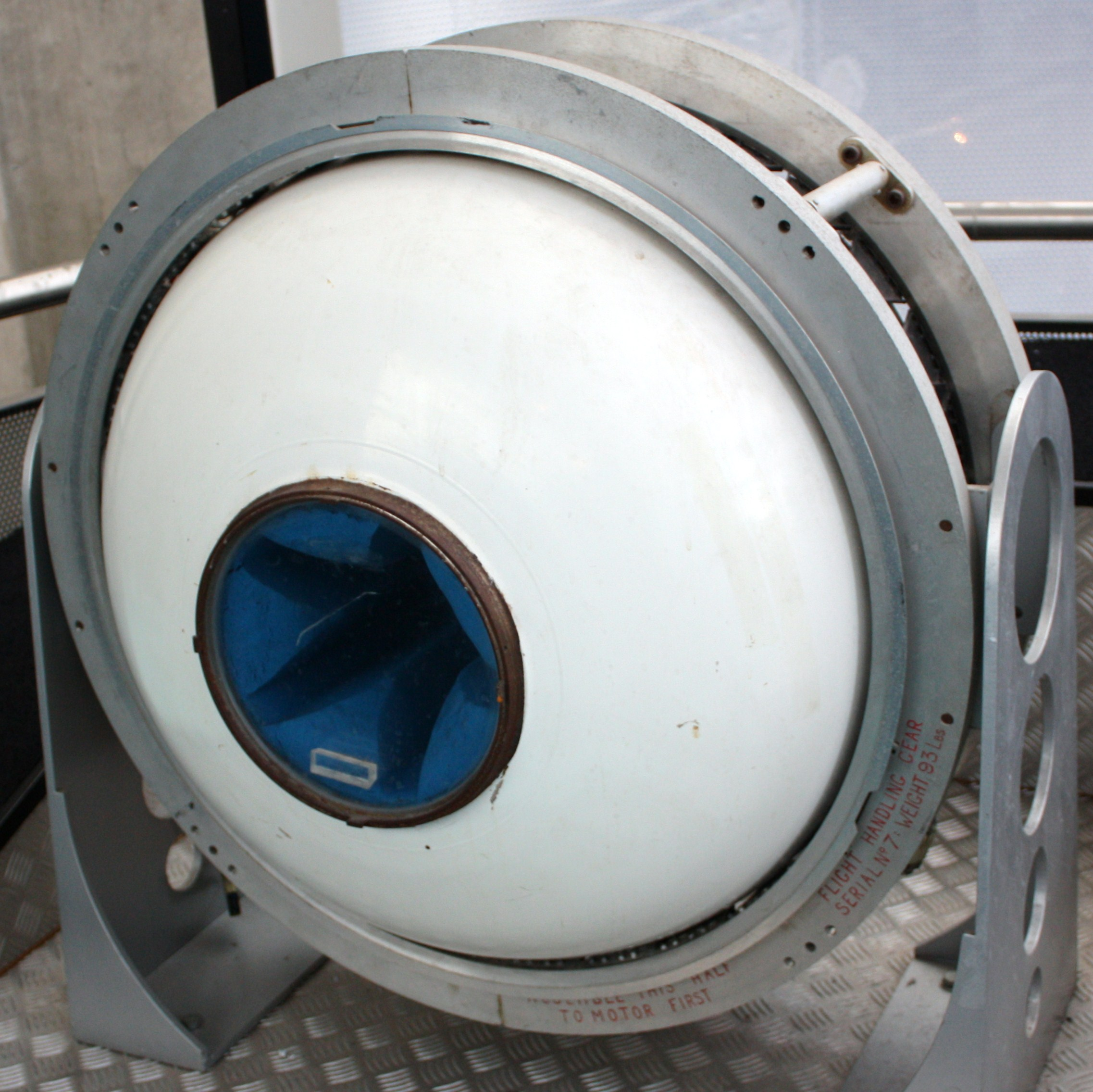
Waxwing seen without its nozzle

Waxwing was a British solid rocket motor used for apogee kick as the 3rd (upper) stage of the Black Arrow satellite launch vehicles. It was also known as Black Arrow-3. Waxwing was used to successfully place the Prospero X-3 satellite into low Earth orbit on 28 October 1971, Britain's only satellite launched on an indigenously developed launch vehicle. Before being separated from the Black Arrow launch vehicle, it would be spun on a turntable using six radial 'Imp' solid rocket motors to spin stabilise the satellite. This means that any discrepancy in thrust in any direction would be cancelled out. The Waxwing motor is now out of production.

Another possible use of Waxwing was to increase the velocity of test re-entry vehicles on Black Knight during tests for the Blue Streak missile. However, this is disputed by other sources.

== Design and development ==
Design was by the Rocket Propulsion Establishment (RPE) at Westcott and it was manufactured by Bristol Aerojet, with four units for the Black Arrow program with their first flight 1969. The casing was spherical and the propellant grain used an internal star profile to control the initial burn rate.

Specifications

- Thrust (sea level): 25.9 kN (5823 lbf)
- Thrust (vacuum): 29.4 kN (6609 lbf)
- Specific impulse (sea level): 245 s
- Specific impulse (vacuum): 278 s
- Burn time: 28 s
- Weight:
  - Gross mass: 397 kg (875 lb)
  - Unfuelled mass: 87 kg (191lb)
- Dimensions:
  - Diameter: 0.69 m (2.26 ft)
  - Height: 1.22 m (4.00 ft)
  - Nozzle length: 22 in (0.56 m)
  - Nozzle diameter: 18 in (0.46 m)

== Operational history ==
Although only four Waxwing motors were manufactured for the Black Arrow programme, the motor achieved historical significance by powering the third stage of the launch vehicle that successfully placed the Prospero satellite into orbit on 28 October 1971. This remains the only satellite launched into orbit by a launch vehicle entirely developed in the United Kingdom. After the cancellation of the Black Arrow programme, the Waxwing motor was retired from operational use.
