= Skylark launch tower =

Tower used for launching rockets

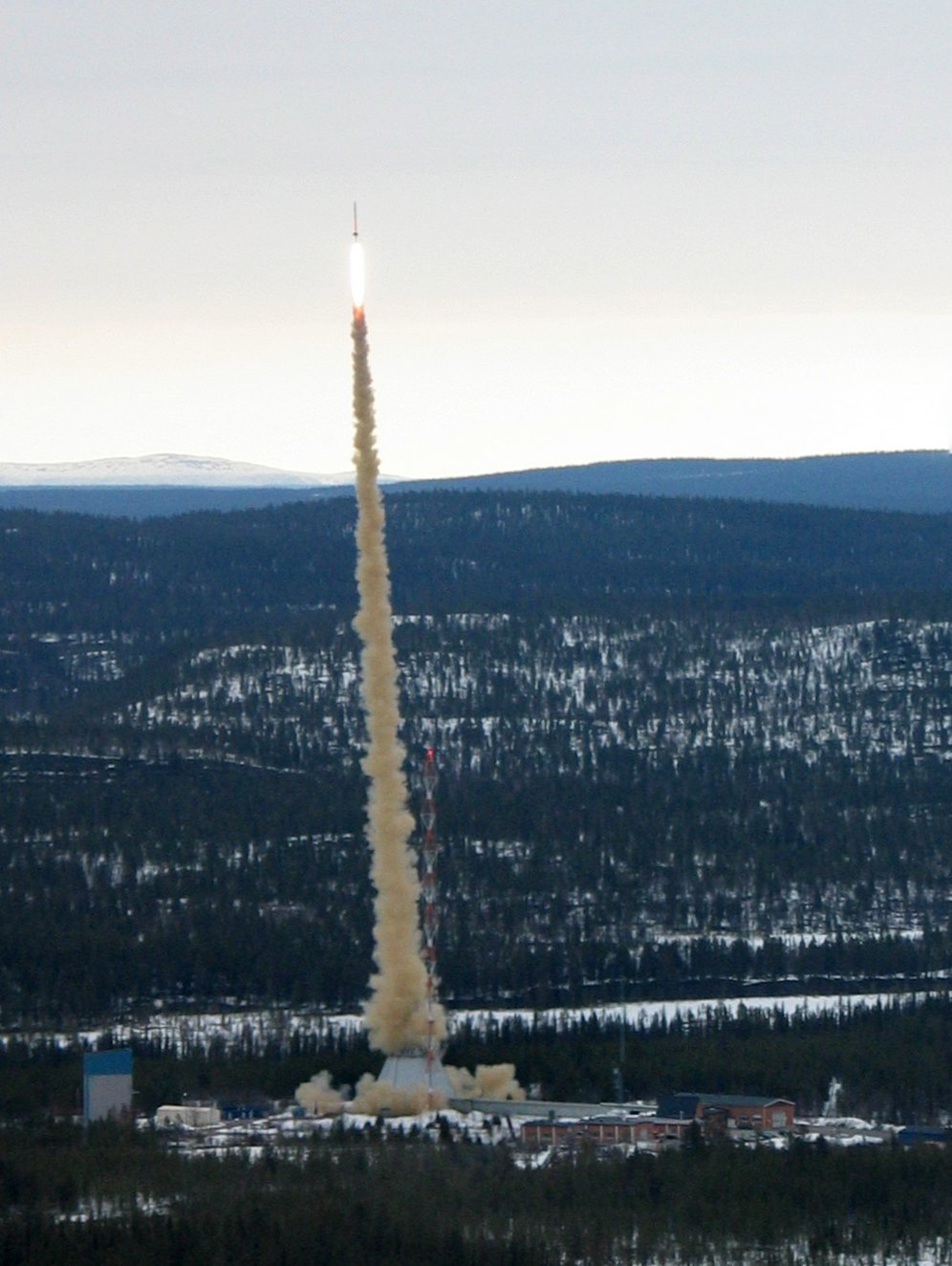
Launch of the final Skylark rocket from the Esrange Skylark tower, 2 May 2005.

A Skylark tower was a tower used for the launch of earlier versions of Skylark rockets. As Skylark rockets had no guidance system and accelerated slowly, they required a safe launch tower with a height of at least 24 metres, with its own guidance system. Later versions of the Skylark rocket were equipped with a more powerful engine and therefore did not need such a large guidance tower for launch.

== Woomera ==
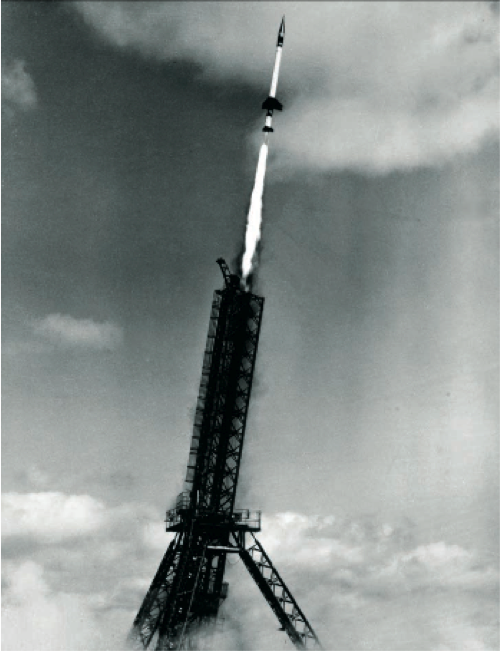
Launch of a Skylark sounding rocket from Woomera, 18 September 1961

In 1956, a 30-metre-tall (98 ft) swivelling launch tower was set up on launch site 2, at Woomera, South Australia at 30.942947° S 136.520678° E. The tower was built of old Bailey bridge segments, weighing 35 tons together. It was since demolished.

== Salto di Quirra ==
At Salto di Quirra, Sardinia in 1965, a 30-metre-tall (98 ft) Skylark tower was erected at 39°36'3"N 9°26'47"E. The tower ceased to be in use from 1972, at which point launches moved to Esrange. The tower remains today.

== Esrange ==
At Esrange, Sweden in 1972, a 30-metre-high (98 ft) Skylark tower was built at 67°53'35"N 21°6'25"E. The tower consists of a pyramid-like building with a launch tower on its top, in order to protect the rocket from cold before launch, necessary as Esrange is within the Arctic Circle. At launch, exhaust doors were opened to enable the smoke to leave the construct.

As Skylark rockets are no longer produced, the Esrange Skylark launch tower was modified in 2005 for launching Brazilian VSB-30 rockets. The tower is now used for launches of rockets manufactured in Brazil.
