= Ray Wheeler =

British engineer (1927–2019)

Ray Wheeler RDI FRAeS FRINA

Technical Director & Chief Designer, British Hovercraft Corporation
- In office 1972–1984

Personal details
- Born: Raymond Leslie Wheeler; 25 October 1927 Mill Hill, Middlesex, England
- Died: 25 June 2019 (aged 91) East Cowes, Isle of Wight, England
- Occupation: Engineer

Raymond Leslie Wheeler (25 October 1927 – 25 June 2019) was a British engineer who was instrumental in Britain's successful development of rocket launchers and hovercraft.

== Early life ==
He was born in Mill Hill, in Middlesex. He attended Newport County Secondary Grammar School (now Carisbrooke College).

From the University College, Southampton he gained a BSc in Engineering in 1948.

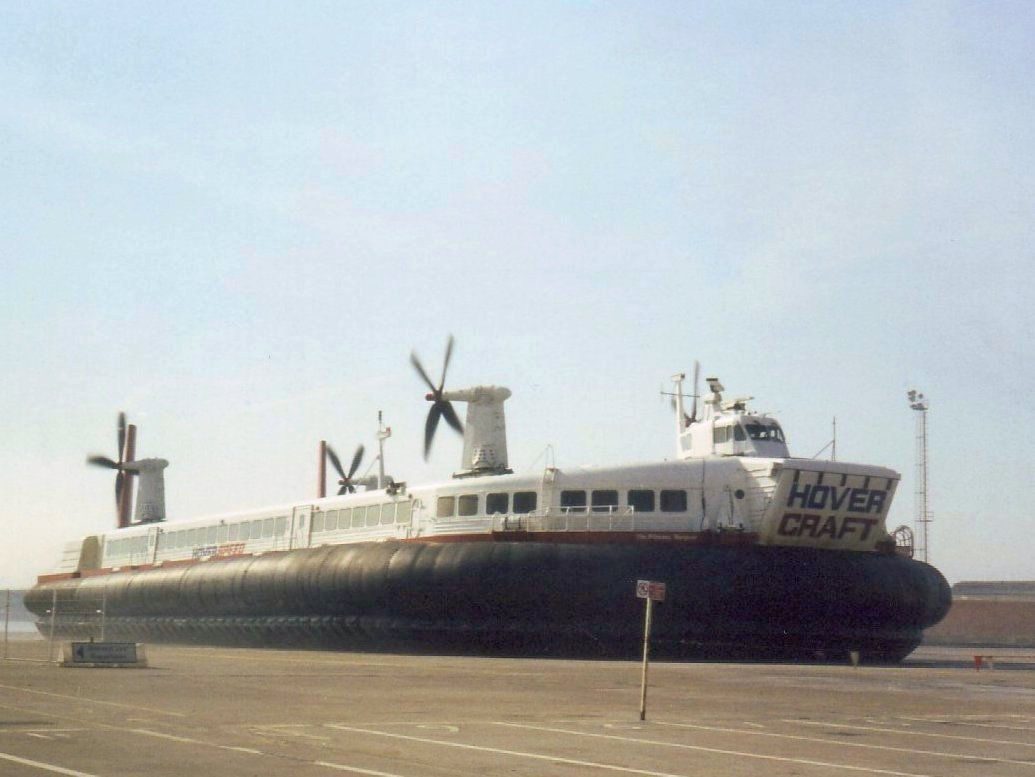
SR.N4 at Dover Hoverport in July 2000

== Career ==
=== Saunders-Roe ===
He joined Saunders-Roe in 1945 as an apprentice. He worked on the SR.N1, the first hovercraft. He eventually became Chief Structural Engineer, working on the 300-tonne SR.N4 hovercraft, as Project Engineer.

At Saunders-Roe he worked with Roy Dommett on the Black Arrow rocket programme, where he was the Chief Designer. Although entirely successful, built on a limited budget, the project came to an abrupt end in November 1971, having been cancelled on 29 July 1971.

=== British Hovercraft Corporation ===
From 1966 to 1985 he was Chief Designer of the British Hovercraft Corporation, and Technical Director from 1972 to 1985.

He became a Fellow of the Royal Aeronautical Society in 1974. In 1995 he became an RDI.

== Personal life ==
He married in Southampton in 1950 and has one son (born 1956) and two daughters (born 1952 and 1954). He was a keen field hockey player for the company teams. He lived at East Cowes.

His funeral was at 1pm on Friday 19 July 2019 at East Cowes Methodist Church.
