= High Down Rocket Test Site =

Coordinates: 50°39′43″N 1°34′43″W

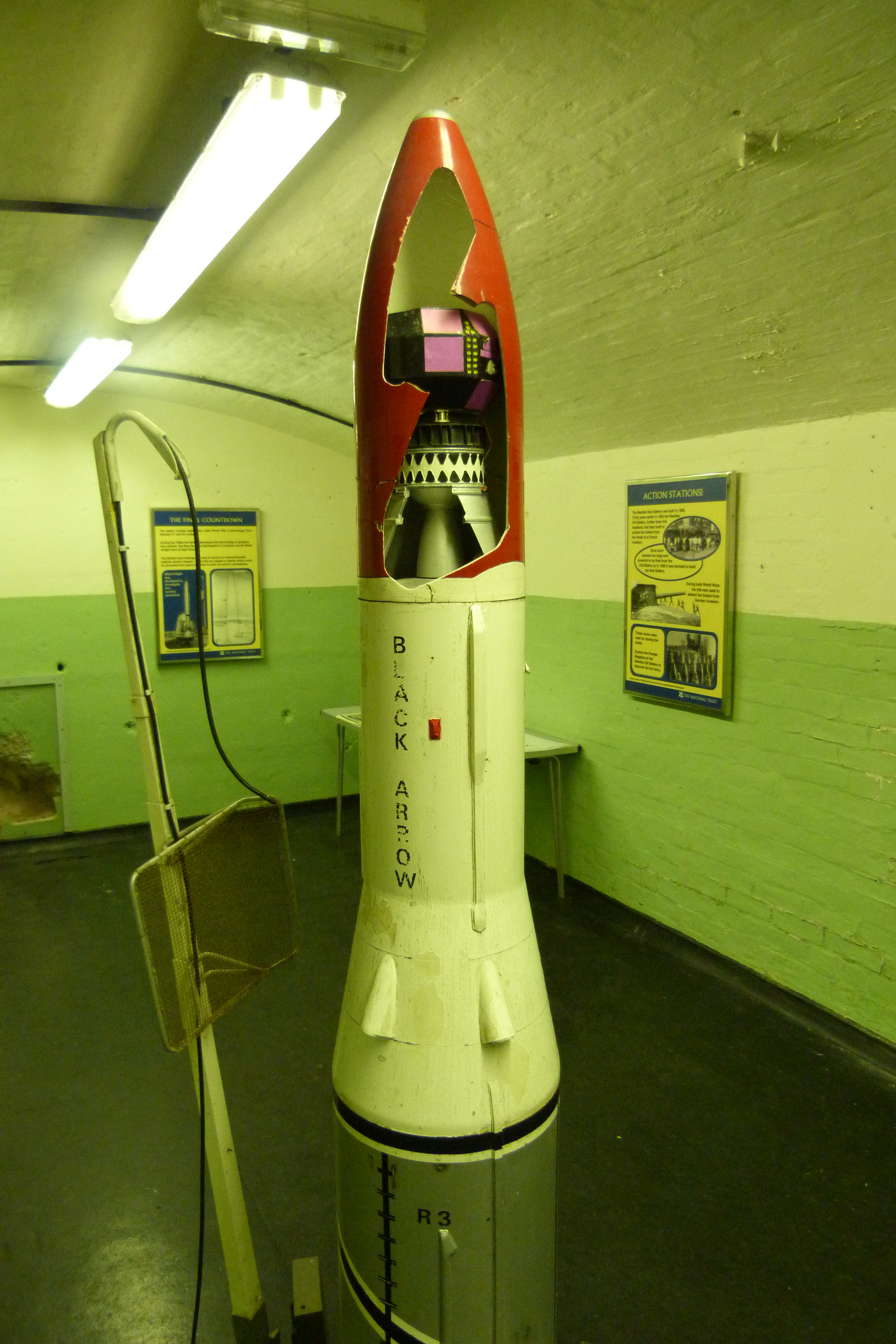
Black Arrow model

The High Down Rocket Test Site is a former Rocket Testing facility on High Down near The Needles.

The remains of the High Down Test Site are a rare example of a 1950s British rocket test facility, built at a time when the country was amongst a handful of nations at the forefront of rocket and missile technology. Internationally, large rocket testing facilities of this date are uncommon...

— Wayne Cocroft, From introduction to Report by English Heritage, ISSN 1749-8775

The site was built and operated in secret, from the 1950s. The Black Arrow rocket, used to launch the Prospero satellite (a wholly British project), was tested at the site. Black Knight was also tested there.

The development of rocketry was a part of the Cold War, in particular the development of Black Knight.

The site is now under the ownership of the National Trust, who also own the neighbouring Needles Battery.
