= Miranda (spacecraft) =

- Names: X4
- COSPAR ID: 1974-013A
- SATCAT no.: 07213

Spacecraft properties
- Manufacturer: Hawker Siddeley Dynamics
- Launch mass: 92 kilograms (203 lb)
- Power: 2 deployable solar arrays

Start of mission
- Launch date: 9 March 1974, 02:22:00 UTC
- Rocket: Scout D-1
- Launch site: Vandenberg SLC-5

Orbital parameters
- Reference system: Geocentric
- Regime: Low Earth Orbit
- Eccentricity: 0.01403
- Perigee altitude: 714 kilometres (444 mi)
- Apogee altitude: 916 kilometres (569 mi)
- Inclination: 97.8 degrees
- Period: 101.2 minutes
- Epoch: 8 March 1974, 08:22:00 UTC

Miranda, also known as X-4, is a British satellite in low Earth orbit. The satellite was launched in March 1974 as an engineering test bed of technologies in orbit.

Miranda was named after a character in the Shakespeare play The Tempest, just like Prospero (spacecraft) and Ariel 1.

== Design ==
=== Operational ===
Miranda used propane cold gas thrusters for attitude control.

=== Sensors ===
It contained a Canopus star sensor to determine the reflectivity and interference caused by the propane.

== Launch ==
Miranda was due to be launched by a British Black Arrow rocket, but due to the project's cancellation the payload was instead launched on the NASA-owned rocket Scout.

== Mission ==
Designed as an engineering test bed for various technologies in orbit, Miranda carried various sensors and detectors.

== Current status ==
The satellite is now non-active, but remains in low Earth orbit.

== See also ==
- 1974 in spaceflight
