= High Down, Isle of Wight =

Chalk down on the Isle of Wight, England

Coordinates: 50.6694°N 1.5394°W

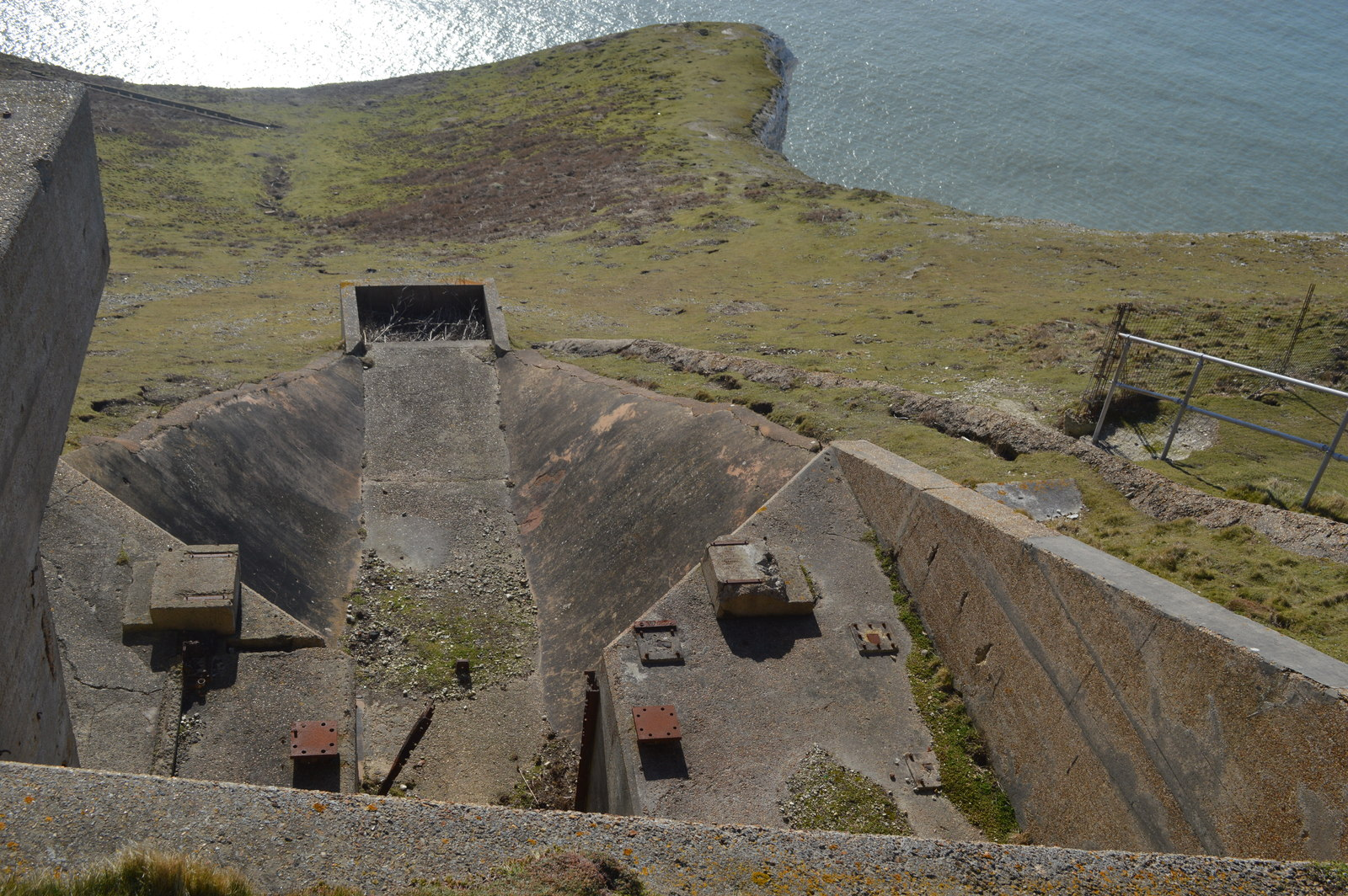
High Down Rocket Test Site

High Down is a chalk down making up the western extent of the ridge that crosses the Isle of Wight, England, and overlooking The Needles rock stacks. It includes Tennyson Down.

The Needles Batteries and the Rocket Launching site are located on the Down It is here where the Black Knight and Black Arrow rockets were tested before being shipped to Woomera in Australia. The entire site is now owned by the National Trust, although it is bordered by The Needles - Landmark Attraction at Alum Bay, which is owned by an independent company. The Rocket Testing site is free to enter, although the Old Battery requires a modest fee.

== See also ==
- Headon Warren And West High Down SSSI
