= Skylark (rocket) =

British sounding rocket family

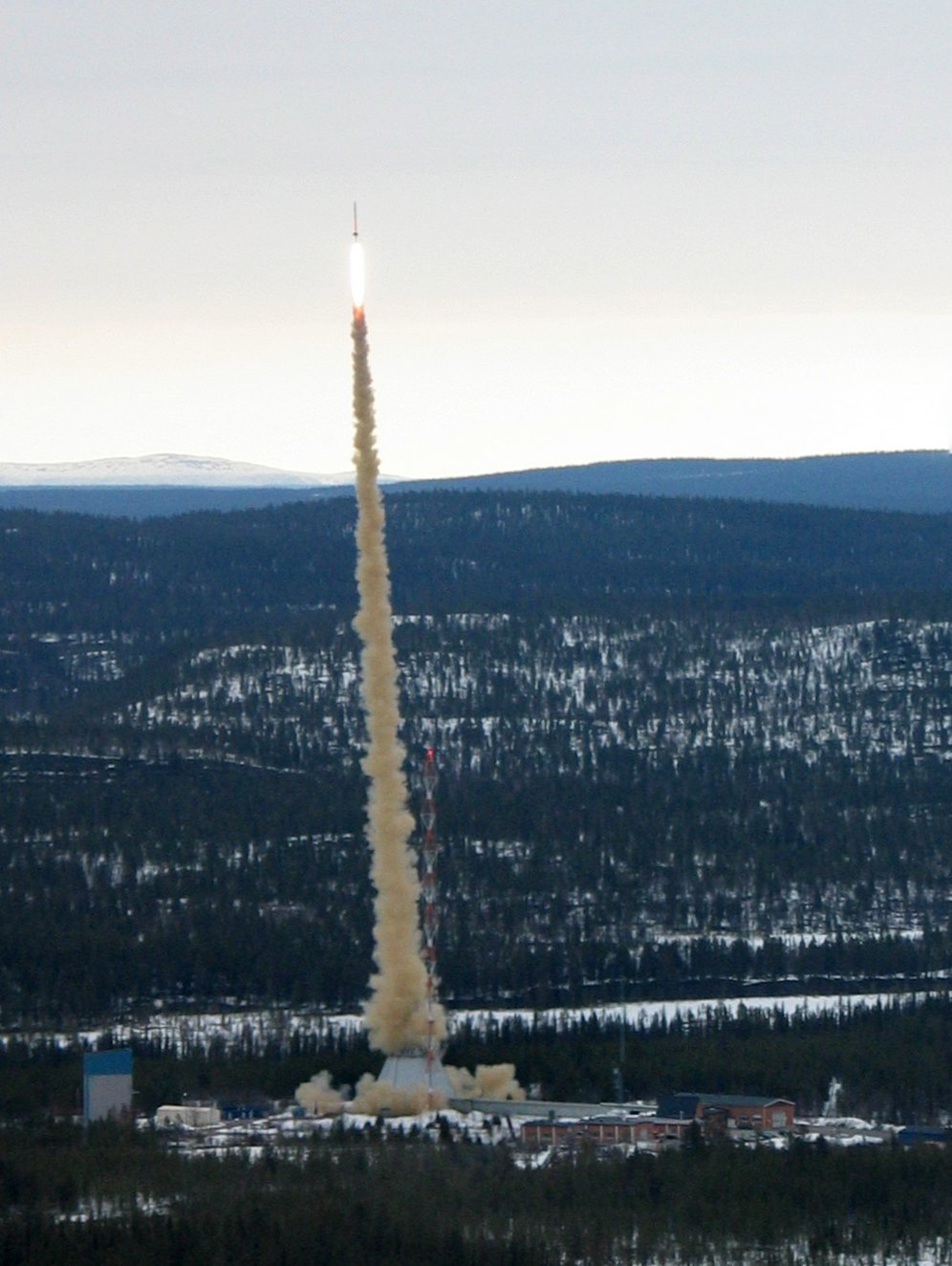
- The final launch of the Skylark at Esrange, Sweden on 2 May 2005
- Function: Sounding rocket
- Manufacturer: Royal Aircraft Establishment
- Country of origin: United Kingdom

Size
- Height: 7.60 m
- Diameter: 0.44 m
- Mass: 1100 kg
- Stages: Initially 1. Later versions had 1 - 3 stages.

Launch history
- Status: Retired 2005
- Launch sites: Woomera, Esrange, and others
- Total launches: 441 total, 266 British.
- First flight: 13 February 1957
- Last flight: 2 May 2005

First stage - Skylark
- Engines: Initially one RPE Raven 1 total impulse 1450 kNs. Later versions also used Cuckoo, Goldfinch, Gosling, Heron and Raven engines in various marks and combinations.
- Thrust: Initially 44.00 kN
- Burn time: Initially 30 s
- Propellant: Initially 840 kg of ammonium perchlorate, polyisobutylene binder and aluminum powder (Raven 1)

Skylark was a family of British sounding rockets. It was operational between 1957 and 2005.

Development of the Skylark begun during the early 1950s at the Royal Aircraft Establishment (RAE), which approached the Royal Society with an offer for it to carry scientific experiments. During early 1955, the British government agreed to provide £100,000 to support the programme's operations for four years. Development of the Skylark, initially known as the CTV.5 Series 3, was pursued at a rapid pace, with hopes that initial launches could take place during the latter half of 1956. On 7 April 1956, the existence of the Skylark rocket was publicly revealed under the early name of Gassiot vehicle. Launch facilities were established at the existing Woomera missile range in Australia; the Skylarks were produced in Britain and flown to Australia for final assembly, testing, and launching.

The Skylark was first launched on 13 February 1957; the first scientific mission occurred during April 1958, quickly becoming regarded as a valuable platform for various fields of research. The vast majority of launches would be performed from Woomera, although other launch sites would later be used at sites across Europe and South America. The British government opted to terminate its support of the programme in 1977, with responsibility for Skylark being turned over to British Aerospace. It continued to be operated for decades more. The 441st and final launch of the Skylark took place from Esrange, Sweden, on 2 May 2005. Launches had been carried out from various purposes, with some military missions being flown, users extended far beyond the UK to include NASA, the European Space Research Organisation (ESRO), and German and Swedish space organizations.

== History ==
=== Development ===
The origins of the Skylark can be traced back to decisions made in the aftermath of the Second World War. Unlike some powers, the United Kingdom had not opted to immediately proceed with work on long-range rocketry; however, the Ministry of Supply did work on defensive guided weaponry, leading to the arrival of surface-to-air missiles such as the Bloodhound during the 1950s. To conduct these programmes, the ministry developed a series of test missiles for research and development. During May 1953, amid the preparations for a major conference in Oxford on rocket-based exploration of the upper atmosphere, the Ministry of Supply approached the Gassiot Committee of the Royal Society with an offer of using ministry rockets for scientific research. This offer, while positively received, was quickly realised to far exceed what would be affordable to the universities. During February 1954, a group of scientists enthusiastically responded to a closed briefing on a Royal Aircraft Establishment (RAE) project, the CTV.5 Series 3 rocket (which would later adopt the name Skylark). The CTV series of rockets had originally been used to investigate aerodynamic control of missiles, yet the Skylark was stated to be capable of carrying a payload of 100 lb to an altitude of 200 km (124 mi).

The Royal Society promptly approached HM Treasury with a request for £100,000 to fund upper atmospheric rocket research over the course of four years. There was considerable interest in exploring the ionosphere, which was relatively unknown at that time, and Skylark would be a revolutionary tool for its study. During April 1955, following the approval of funding, the research programme formally commenced; roughly half of the £100,000 was spent on the vehicles themselves, while the remainder covered the costs of scientific instruments and technical staff. Various university groups were responsible for the design and construction of the scientific instruments carried, as well as post-mission analysis; all other aspects were the responsibility of the Ministry of Supply. A subcommittee of the Gassiot Committee coordinated the overall programme.

In addition to its scientific role, Skylark was also to serve a military purpose, being available to the RAE's research programme, including in the development of ballistic missiles; in return, the RAE provided considerable assistance in the rocket's design, manufacture, preparation, and firing. Numerous RAE personnel were allocated to the Skylark initiative. A relatively ambitious target date for the first launch was set for the summer of 1956 during the International Geophysical Year, necessitating development to be completed in little over a year. Additional support for the Skylark programme was sourced from the Rocket Propulsion Establishment (RPE) at Westcott with the development and testing of the Raven 1 rocket engine.

On 7 April 1956, the existence of the Skylark rocket was publicly revealed under the early name of Gassiot vehicle. Even before this announcement, it had been decided that Skylark would be fired from the Woomera rocket range in Australia. While work did proceed at a fast pace on the project, an ignition problem encountered during the RPE's proof testing forced the postponement of the first launch past a November 1956 slot and, partially due to the Woomera's range's closure for Christmas, was delayed until the following year. On 13 February 1957, the Skylark performed its first launch from Woomera; for this initial test flight, it carried no experimental payload save for RAE test instrumentation to monitor the rocket's performance. It was the first long range vehicle to be launched from Woomera.

=== Operations ===
During April 1958, scientific use of the Skylark commenced, marking the programme's attainment of true operational status. Unlike the majority of missile/rocket programmes, which would only temporarily be based at Woomera until they matured, Skylark continued to operate at Woomera as its long term home. This arrangement necessitated an international supply chain between Britain and South Australia; early Skylarks were transported by plane, along with a kit of parts that were locally assembled by a mostly Australian workforce. Once assembled, the rockets would be transported a further 270 miles to the actual range for roughly two weeks of final preparation ahead of launching. After multiple rounds of testing, the rocket would be mounted on a trailer and taken to the launch platform, usually two days prior to the launch date; the launch itself was overseen by Australian Weapons Research Establishment personnel from an underground control room at the edge of the concrete apron.

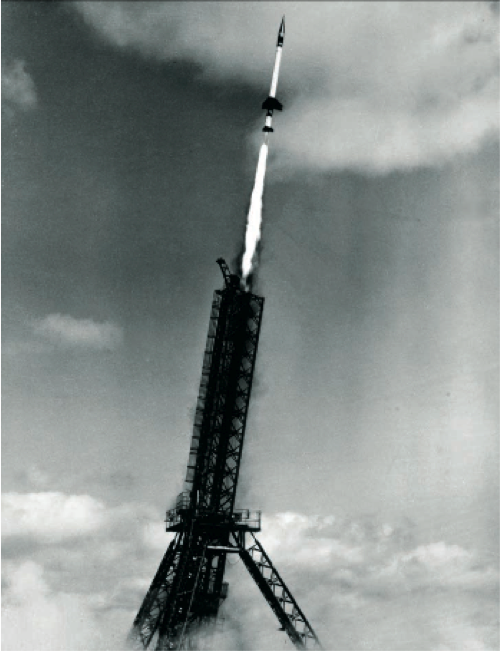
Launch of a Skylark sounding rocket from Woomera in South Australia, on September 18, 1961, for NASA Mission 9.01 GG Astronomy, PS (193 km).

The pace of launches climbed rapidly in the first four years of the programme; while eight Skylarks were launched in 1958, this rose to 17 during 1961. The good performance record and value of the Skylark programme was recognised by the British government's Advisory Council on Scientific Policy in 1961. Yet, there were figures within the RAE that felt that the overall success rate of the programme of 40% was far beneath that of the rocket itself, which had a 90% success rate; this was speculated to have been due to the somewhat informal administrative process of the programme and a lack of funding. Some funding had been made available for improvements, such as the continuous development of the Raven rocket motor.

During the 1960s, Skylark proved itself to be an excellent platform for space astronomy, possessing the ability to point at the Sun, Moon, or a star. It was used to obtain the first good-quality X-ray images of the solar corona. In 1963 alone, a total of 14 experiments relating to solar physics were conducted using the Skylark. Within the UK national programme, the frequency of Skylark launches peaked at 20 during 1965 (from Woomera), a total of 198 flights took place between 1957 and 1978 alone.

During the mid-1960s, a key improvement in the form of the stabilised payload system was introduced; as Skylark was designed as a fin-stabilised rocket, there was no guidance once outside of the atmosphere, causing the vehicle to tumble and spin. The new stabilisation system used a pair of gyroscopes connected to thermionic amplifiers to appropriately actuate a series of control valves; it was first deployed in 1961 and became routine by the end of the decade. One rejected enhancement around this time was the construction of a second launch platform at Woomera.

By February 1967, the tenth anniversary of the Skylark's first launch, 157 launches had been performed, carrying in excess of 300 scientific experiments. The first X-ray surveys of the sky in the Southern Hemisphere were provided by Skylark launches. Multiple Skylarks were used with atypically high precision during September and October 1972 in an effort to locate the optical counterpart of X-ray source GX3+1 by lunar occultation.

As early as June 1965, Australia made informal requests to have use of several Skylark launches; these requests were complicated by their informal nature and a lack of budget for such endeavours. Occasionally, Australian scientific experiments were flown on Skylarks being used for RAE tests, as these did not typically make much use of the payload capability. During 1975, the Federal Republic of Germany through the DFVLR (now German Aerospace Center or DLR) agreed with Australia to cooperate on the launch of a Skylark rocket at Woomera for scientific purposes. This launch took place on 14 March 1975. This was followed by three more, launched on 22 February, 13 March 1979, and 24 August 1987.

Skylarks were constructed in quantity into the late 1970s, up until the British government decided to terminate the programme in 1977, having concluded that future "low weight" research would be carried out using NASA's Space Shuttle instead. Furthermore, by the 1970s, sounding rockets in general were facing increasing competition from scientific satellites, which could conduct missions for far longer terms and across a greater geographical range. The Skylark programme was transferred to British Aerospace, who subsequently sold it to Matra Marconi Space. While the number of launches declined substantially during the late 1970s and the 1980s, the scientific payloads being carried by Skylarks were becoming increasingly complex and ambitious. During 1999, Marconi sold the programme to a small private company, Sounding Rocket Services, based in Bristol.

Beginning in 2018, Skyrora, a British aerospace & launch company, has developed and launched a new series of "Skylark" sounding rockets, reviving the name. They have launched from northern Scotland, where Shetland spaceport and Sutherland spaceport are being built, and also from Iceland. They plan to also develop a satellite launch vehicle which will launch from the UK, which will be a first for the country, which previously only launched satellites from Woomera, Australia.

== Description ==
The basic Skylark is 7.6 metres (25 ft) long, 0.44 metres (17 in) in diameter and has a fin span of 0.96 metres (38 in). Booster stages can increase the height to 12.8 metres (42 ft). The original version was propelled by 840 kilograms (1,850 lb) of solid fuel, which enabled 45 kilograms (99 lb) to be launched to an altitude of over 200 kilometres (120 mi).

Improvements were made to the engine and the use of a booster increased the payload to 200 kilograms (440 lb) in 1960. Skylark 12, from 1976, could lift 200 kilograms (440 lb) to 575 kilometres (357 mi) altitude.

Due to its small mass and low thrust, the original version of the Skylark had to be launched from a 25 metres (82 ft) tilting tower to overcome the effects of the wind. Later versions only required a simple trailer.

Skylark versions
Rocket	Stage 1	Stage 2	Stage 3
Skylark	Raven 1		
Skylark	Raven 2		
Skylark 1	Raven 8	Raven 1/1A/2A	
Skylark 2	Cuckoo 1A	Raven 2	Raven 8
Skylark 2C	Cuckoo 1A	Raven 2	
Skylark 5C	Cuckoo 1A	Raven 5	
Skylark 5	Raven 5	Raven 5	
Skylark 7C	Cuckoo 1A	Raven 7	
Skylark 7	Raven 7	Goldfinch 2	Raven 11
Skylark 3	Cuckoo IA	Raven 6	
Skylark 11	Goldfinch 2	Raven 7	Cuckoo 2 or 4
Skylark 6	Goldfinch 2	Raven 6	
Skylark 2 AC	Cuckoo 1A	Raven 8	
Skylark 4	Goldfinch	Raven 8	
Skylark 10A	Goldfinch	Gosling 4T	
Skylark 7 AC	Goldfinch 2	Raven 11	
Skylark 12	Goldfinch 2A	Raven 11	Cuckoo 4
Skylark 12AC	Goldfinch	Raven 11	Goldfinch 2
Cuckoo Skylark	Cuckoo	Raven 2	
Cuckoo Skylark	Cuckoo	Raven 5	
Cuckoo Skylark	Cuckoo	Raven 7	
Skylark 3	Cuckoo I	Raven 6	
Skylark 4	Goldfinch	Raven 6	
Skylark 6	Goldfinch 2A	Raven 5	
Skylark 5	Raven 11		
Skylark 10	Raven 11	Gosling 4	
Skylark 14	Rook 3	Raven 11	
Skylark 15	Rook 3	Raven 11	Cuckoo 4

== On display ==
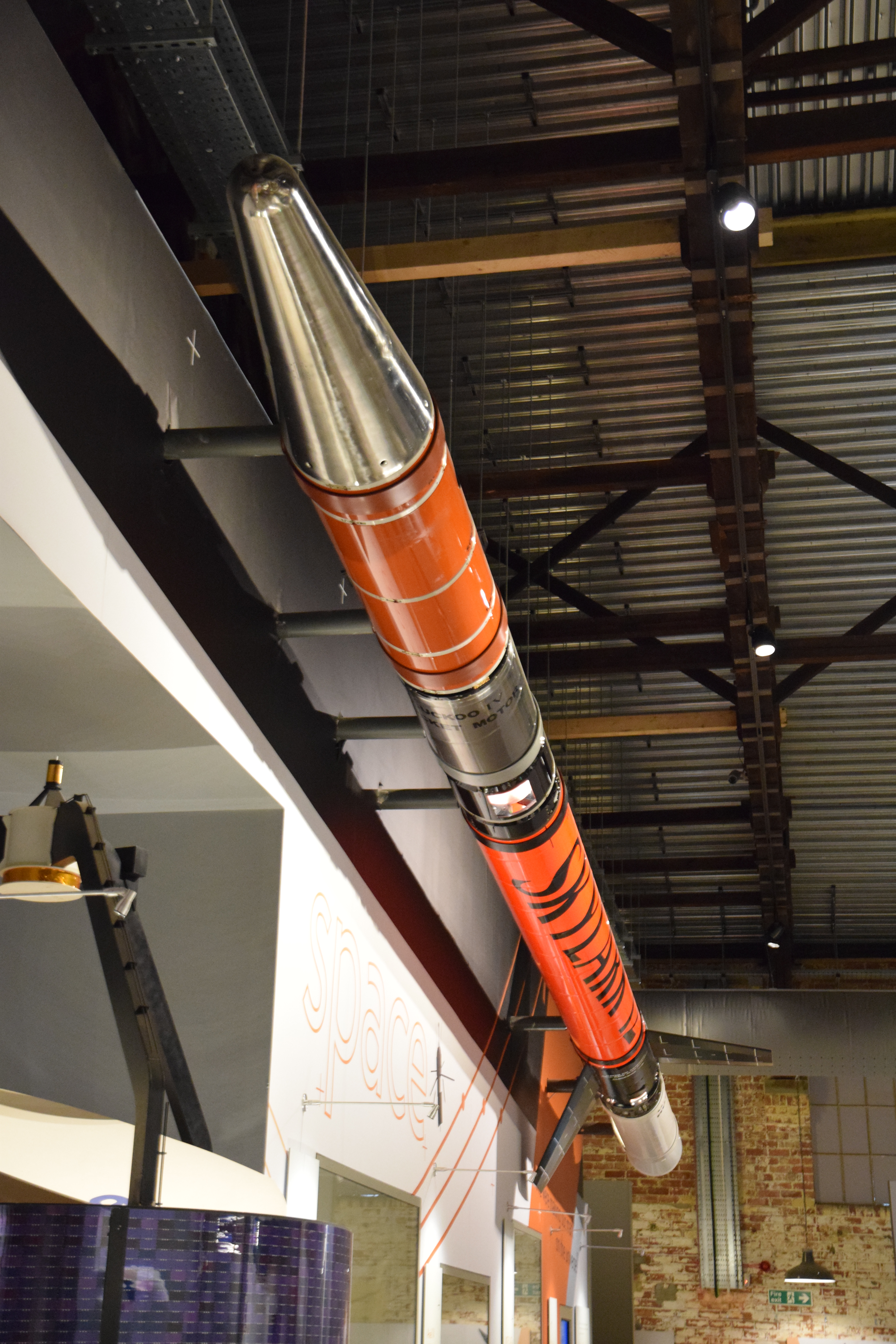
Skylark at Aerospace Bristol, Filton.

Skylark Rockets are on display in the following locations:

- University of Leicester, Department of Physics and Astronomy. (Skylark Raven (c. 1957)).
- National Space Centre in Leicester. (Skylark Goldfinch Raven).
- Mullard Space Science Laboratory, Surrey, England. (Skylark 7 (Goldfinch II, Raven XI)).
- Royal Observatory, Edinburgh, Visitor Centre, Edinburgh, Scotland. (Skylark Nosecone only).
- Rocketry Museum, Woomera, Australia (Skylark Nosecone only).
- Woomera Missile Park, Woomera, Australia (Cuckoo, Raven).
- The Euro Space Center in Belgium (Replica).
- QVMAG, Launceston, Tasmania, Australia.
- Aerospace Bristol, Filton, Bristol, England.
- In the possession of Mexborough & Swinton Astronomical Society in South Yorkshire, England.
- Solna strandvag 86, Stockholm, Sweden. (Partly viewable from the waterfront).
- South Australian Aviation Museum Port Adelaide, Australia Skylark (Raven), Skylark (Cuckoo, Raven) and Skylark Instrument section.

== See also ==
- Black Arrow
- Black Knight
- Blue Streak (missile)
- Skylark launch tower
- Skyrora Skylark
