= Summerfield Research Station =

Coordinates: 52.358363°N 2.240410°W

The Summerfield Research Station is a development and production site for solid rocket motors in the United Kingdom officially formed on 1 September 1951 by the Ministry of Supply. It was set up on the grounds of a former World War II munitions factory just south of Kidderminster, southwest of Birmingham. It opened on 1 January 1952 and remains in use as of 2020.

Previous UK rocket motors, like those on the RP-3, used Cordite as their propellant, formed into a solid using various binders and then moulded into cylinders with internal cavities to control the rate of burn. While the US adopted the UK concept of shaped cavities, the UK adopted the US double-base powder, which was the basis for contemporary US rocket designs and offered higher energy. The combination of these two features formed the basis for military rockets until the introduction of aluminum-boosted propellants in the 1960s.

Since its formation, the site has produced rocket motors for many UK weapons systems. Among its early successes was a motor design for the Sea Slug missile, which allowed that design to switch from a liquid fuel rocket, considered a hazard on ships. Other successes include the motors for Vigilant, Swingfire, MILAN, Thunderbird, Seacat, Sea Dart, Sea Wolf and Sea Skua. Over the years, solid rocket design was centralized at Summerfield, taking on employees from the Rocket Propulsion Establishment and the Propellants, Explosives and Rocket Motor Establishment at the Waltham Abbey Royal Gunpowder Mills as those establishments closed.

Summerfield was initially run by Imperial Chemical Industries, but in 1975 it was handed off to their subsidiary, Imperial Metal Industries (IMI) to become IMI Summerfield. The division was purchased by British Aerospace in 1998 and over the next few years changed name several times until BAe merged the division with the French firm Celerg to form Roxel. Today the site is officially known as Roxel (UK Rocket Motors) Limited.
