= Woomera Launch Area 5 =

Rocket launch site on the Woomera Test Range in Australia

Launch Area 5
- Interactive map of Launch Area 5
- Launch site: Woomera
- Coordinates: 30°58′23″S 136°28′32″E
- Short name: LA-5
- Operator: RAAF
- Total launches: 26
- Launch pad: 3
- Orbital inclination range: 82–90°
LA-5 launch history
- Status: (2013) DSTO Rocket Engine Test Facility
- Launches: 12
- First launch: 7 June 1961
- Last launch: 25 November 1965
- Associated rockets: Black Knight
LA-5A launch history
- Status: Decommissioned
- Launches: 9
- First launch: 7 September 1958
- Last launch: 7 May 1961
- Associated rockets: Black Knight
LA-5B launch history
- Status: Decommissioned
- Launches: 5
- First launch: 9 May 1961
- Last launch: 28 October 1971
- Associated rockets: Black Knight; Black Arrow

Launch Area 5 (LA5) is an operational site at the RAAF Woomera Test Range, forming part of the Woomera Range Complex.

Originally, LA5 functioned as a rocket launch site supporting a number of British experimental launches, including the United Kingdom's first—and as of 2023 only—satellite launch. The site consisted of three separate launch pads, which supported 22 Black Knight sounding rocket launches, and four Black Arrow carrier rocket launches.

Of the four Black Arrow launches, two were orbital. The first, on 2 September 1970, failed, while the second, on 28 October 1971, succeeded, placing the Prospero satellite into low Earth orbit.
