= Rocket Propulsion Establishment =

UK-based military research site at RAF Westcott

- Westcott, Buckinghamshire, UK
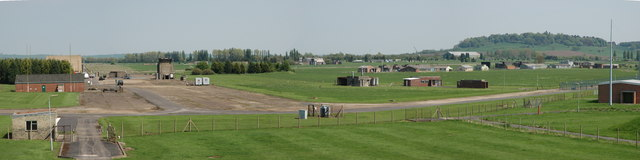

Location
- Location within Buckinghamshire
- Coordinates: 51.842°N 0.975°W

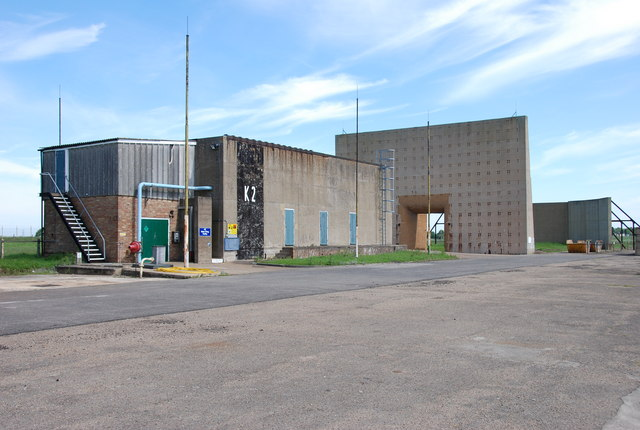
The K2 test stand for solid propellant rocket motors

The Rocket Propulsion Establishment (RPE) specialised in the design, testing, and manufacture of rocketry. It was based at Westcott, Buckinghamshire. Founded 1946 as the Guided Projectile Establishment, it was based at the former RAF Westcott. The site was often referred to as the PERME Westcott (Propellants, Explosives and Rocket Motor Establishment, Westcott). The establishment was the UK's primary rocketry development centre through the Cold War.

The RPE worked on numerous rocket motors that propelled various British guided missiles and research vehicles alike, including the Blue Streak intermediate range ballistic missile, the Black Arrow expendable launch vehicle, and the Chevaline countermeasure to Soviet anti-ballistic missile systems. The RPE worked closely with the Royal Aircraft Establishment (RAE), which tested the completed missile systems. In 1984, the RPE came under the control of the Royal Ordnance Factories; three years later, ownership transferred to British Aerospace (BAe). BAe continued rocketry activity at Westcott until the mid 1990s. The site became Westcott Venture Park, which has hosted several propulsion-focused businesses, including Nammo and Reaction Engines Ltd.

== History ==
The Rocket Propulsion Establishment (RPE) was created in April 1946 under the direction of the Ministry of Supply. It was located on a former wartime training base for bomber crew, then known as RAF Westcott. It was a relatively remote location and provided ample space for numerous facilities to be built up over time, it remained accessible to air as its runway was intentionally kept clear. Originally named the Guided Projectile Establishment upon its founding, it was redesignated as the RPE just one year later.

The RPE's early activities were heavily influenced by Nazi Germany's advances in rocketry. A team of German scientists were recruited and brought to Westcott, several of which remained employed at the site into the 1960s. Furthermore, numerous examples of German weapons were transported to the site for research. Specific weapons included the V-1 flying bomb; V-2 ballistic missile; Feuerlilie F-55 subsonic missile; Messerschmitt Me 163B rocket-propelled interceptor; Rheintochter-1 anti-aircraft missile; Ruhrstahl X-4 air-to-air wire-controlled missile; Enzian E-1 3,150-lb missile; Henschel Hs 298 anti-aircraft missile; Hs 293 anti-shipping weapon; and Schmetterling and Wasserfall anti-aircraft missiles. Two known areas of research for the RPE during the late 1940s were bipropellant rocket engines and solid fuel rocket propellants.

The site quickly played a key role in cutting edge military programmes. The site was known to have been involved in the development of the Saunders-Roe SR.53, a prototype interceptor aircraft that used mixed jet and rocket propulsion that was being developed for the Royal Air Force (RAF) during the 1950s. Another key programme was the Black Arrow, a liquid-fuelled three-stage expendable launch system, which performed Britain's first and only successful orbital launch before being cancelled on economic grounds. The RPE was also involved in the Blue Streak intermediate range ballistic missile and the Skylark sounding rocket, the latter was heavily used for decades and remained operational into the early twenty-first century.

Throughout the Cold War, Westcott was involved in the design and development of numerous rocket motors, being responsible for most of the rocket motors used in British guided missiles and research vehicles across this era. The site was expanded over time with various specialised purpose-built facilities; a substantial portion of these were used to conduct test firings of the rocket motors. Other specialised test structures operated by the RPE included vacuum firing tanks (capable of simulating upper atmosphere and underwater firings by varying the pressure) and a centrifugal firing point. Production facilities were also established on site, from which limited production runs were conducted; the RPE could fill and seal liquid-fuelled rocket motors ready for delivery to end users.

The design of these complete missile systems was undertaken by the Royal Aircraft Establishment (RAE) at its facilities in Farnborough and Bedford. In 1977, a reorganisation created the Propellants, Explosives and Rocket Motor Establishment (PERME). In 1984, the RPE came under the control of the Royal Ordnance Factories. On 22 April 1987, ownership was transferred to the private sector when British Aerospace (BAe) acquired Royal Ordnance in exchange for £190 million. Under BAe's control, Westcott undertook rocket motor development until the mid 1990s.

== Westcott Venture Park ==
During the late 1990s and early 2000s, the site was reorganised and became Westcott Venture Park, a business park for light industry. Businesses include a division of Norwegian company Nammo, which continues design and manufacture of the LEROS rocket engines, developed by Royal Ordnance; and Airborne Engineering Ltd, whose capabilities include rocket system design and testing. Accordingly, Westcott still hosts active rocket test facilities.

Numerous buildings and large test stands from the RPE days remain intact but abandoned on the site. In 2013, English Heritage designated the surviving test-stands and control rooms as Grade II* or Grade II listed buildings.

In 2016, the UK Government announced plans to develop a National Propulsion Test Facility at the site, Five years later, this facility opened; it contains, among other things, a test cell capable of testing engines of up to 1,300N thrust. It is a self-contained facility that does not vent exhaust gasses to the outside. Reaction Engines Ltd contributed their heat exchange technology, allowing the exhaust gasses to be quickly cooled from 2000 °C to 50 °C.

In 2017, Reaction Engines Ltd began construction of a test facility to develop their SABRE rocket engine, intended for the Skylon reusable spaceplane. The company ceased operations in 2024.

== Projects ==
The RPE worked on numerous rocket and missile programmes for both civilian and military purposes:

- Black Arrow – Waxwing third-stage motor
- Black Knight
- Jaguar – first-, second- and third-stage motors
- Skylark - the Raven and Cuckoo engines
- Seaslug – for naval use
