= Prospero (spacecraft) =

British experimental satellite launched in 1971

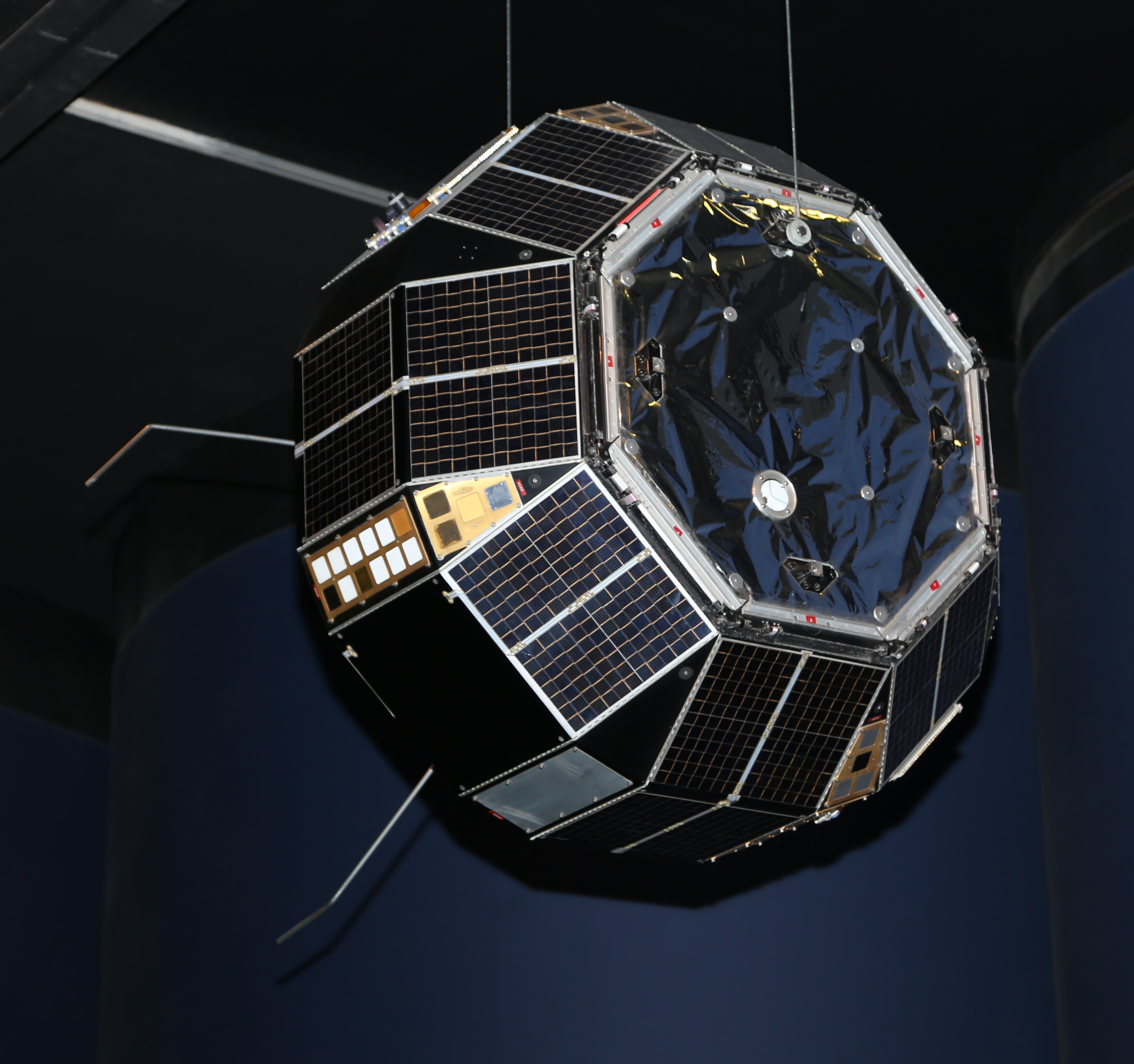
- Flight spare of the Prospero satellite in the Science Museum, London.
- Names: Puck
- Mission type: Technology
- Operator: RAE
- COSPAR ID: 1971-093A
- SATCAT no.: 5580
- Mission duration: 53 years, 6 months and 27 days (in orbit)

Spacecraft properties
- Manufacturer: BAC; Marconi
- Launch mass: 66 kilograms (146 lb)

Start of mission
- Launch date: 28 October 1971 04:09 GMT
- Rocket: Black Arrow R3
- Launch site: Woomera LA-5B

End of mission
- Disposal: Deorbit
- Decay date: 2070 (planned)

Orbital parameters
- Reference system: Geocentric
- Regime: Low Earth
- Semi-major axis: 7,295.54 kilometres (4,533.24 mi)
- Eccentricity: 0.053451
- Perigee altitude: 534 kilometres (332 mi)
- Apogee altitude: 1,314 kilometres (816 mi)
- Inclination: 82.04 degrees
- Period: 103.36 minutes
- Epoch: 24 January 2015, 04:50:31 UTC

The Prospero satellite, also known as the X-3, was launched by the United Kingdom in 1971. It was designed to undertake a series of experiments to study the effects of the space environment on communications satellites and remained operational until 1973, after which it was contacted annually for over 25 years. Although Prospero was the first British satellite to have been launched successfully by a British rocket, Black Arrow, the first British satellite placed in orbit was Ariel 1, launched in April 1962 on a US rocket.

== Construction ==
Prospero was built by the Royal Aircraft Establishment in Farnborough. Initially called Puck, it was designed to conduct experiments to test the technologies necessary for communication satellites. Two experimental solar cells setups were tested. One was a test of a lightweight cell and mounting. The other was an attempt to replace the standard fused silica cover of solar cells with a cerium oxide-based cover. Designs for telemetry and power systems were also tested. It also carried a micrometeoroid detector, to measure the presence of very small particles. The detector worked on the principle of impact ionisation. When the Ministry of Defence cancelled the Black Arrow programme, the development team decided to continue with the project but renamed the satellite Prospero when it was announced it would be the last launch attempt using a British rocket. An earlier Black Arrow launch, carrying the Orba X-2 satellite, had failed to achieve orbit after a premature second stage shut-down.

== Launch ==
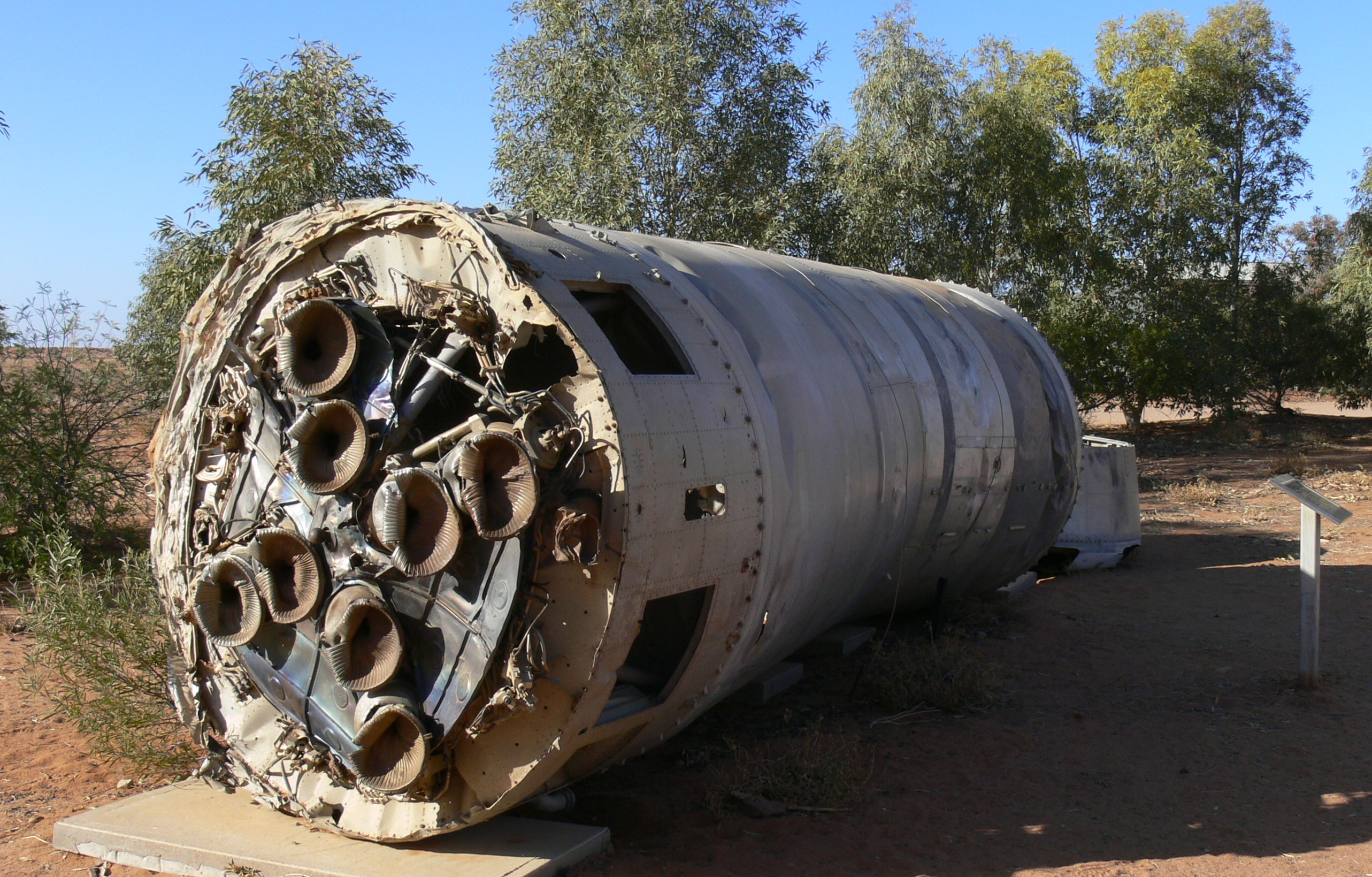
Remains of the first stage of the British Black Arrow three stage rocket, showing the eight nozzles of its Gamma engine. This portion of the rocket is now in the Memorial Park at William Creek, South Australia, having been recovered from the surrounding Anna Creek Station.

Prospero was launched at 04:09 GMT on 28 October 1971, from Launch Area 5B (LA-5B) at Woomera, South Australia, on a Black Arrow rocket, making Britain the sixth nation to place a satellite into orbit using a domestically developed carrier rocket. The Black Arrow's final stage Waxwing rocket also entered orbit, "rather too enthusiastically", as it continued to thrust after separation and collided with Prospero, detaching one of the satellite's four radio antennae.

== Operations ==
The satellite was operated from R.A.E Lasham. For the satellite's early orbits additional reporting was provided by the European Space Research Organisation's ESTRACK system. In regular operation real time data support was provided by a Science Research Council station at Port Stanley in the Falkland Islands.

== Results ==
The lightweight solar cell design was found to be successful. The cerium oxide cover was not, with the solar cell using it showing an increased rate of degradation.

== Status ==
Prospero's tape recorders stopped working in 1973. As was noted in an episode of the BBC television series Coast, radio transmissions from Prospero could still be heard on 137.560 MHz in 2004, though the signals used in the episode would actually come from an Orbcomm satellite, rather than Prospero (as the later Orbcomm used the same 137.560 MHz frequency since Prospero was considered no longer active). Prospero had officially been deactivated in 1996, when the UK's Defence Research Establishment decommissioned their satellite tracking station at Lasham, Hampshire but the satellite had been turned on in past years on its anniversary. It is in a low Earth orbit and is not expected to decay until about 2070, almost 100 years after its launch.

In September 2011 a team at University College London's Mullard Space Science Laboratory announced plans to re-establish communications with Prospero, in time for the satellite's 40th anniversary. As of September 2012, not much progress had been made in establishing contact with the satellite due to time constraints. At perigee, Prospero can be seen through binoculars at magnitude +6 overhead, steady.

== See also ==
- Timeline of artificial satellites and space probes
- Ariel 1
