= Westcott, Buckinghamshire =

Village in Buckinghamshire, England

Coordinates: 51.8466°N 0.9570°W

Westcott
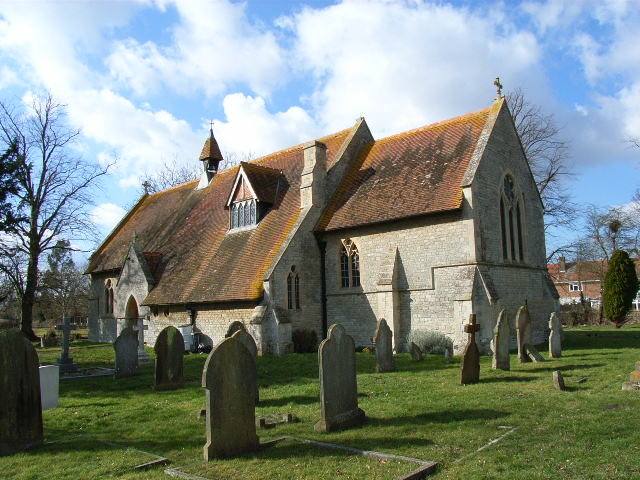
- St Mary the Virgin parish church

- Location within Buckinghamshire
- Population: 448 (2011 Census)
- OS grid reference: SP7117
- Civil parish: Westcott
- Unitary authority: Buckinghamshire
- Ceremonial county: Buckinghamshire
- Region: South East
- Country: England
- Sovereign state: United Kingdom
- Post town: Aylesbury
- Postcode district: HP18
- Dialling code: 01296
- Police: Thames Valley
- Fire: Buckinghamshire
- Ambulance: South Central
- UK Parliament: Mid Buckinghamshire
- Website: Westcott Parish Council

Westcott is a village and civil parish in the unitary authority area of Buckinghamshire, England, about 1 mile (1.6 km) west of Waddesdon.

The toponym is derived from the Old English for "west cottage".

The Church of England parish church of St Mary the Virgin was designed by the Oxford Diocesan architect G.E. Street and built in 1867. It is a Grade II* listed building.

In the 20th century Westcott was the site of the Rocket Propulsion Establishment, which was on the former RAF Westcott airfield to the west of the main village. This has since been closed down, and the area is called the Westcott Venture Park. BAE Systems maintains a presence on the site (BAE Systems Environmental) which advises on the decommissioning of military sites.

G.E. Street also designed the parish school. It is now Westcott Church of England School, a mixed primary school. In 2012 it gained permission to expand the age range of its children, taking them from 4–11 years old, with an integrated pre-school nursery that caters to children of 3 for half days.

The school closed down in 2022

== Sources and further reading ==
- Page, W.H., ed. (1927). "Waddesdon with Westcott and Woodham". A History of the County of Buckingham. Victoria County History. Vol. 4. pp. 107–118.
- Pevsner, Nikolaus (1960). Buckinghamshire. The Buildings of England. Harmondsworth: Penguin Books. pp. 281–282. ISBN 0-14-071019-1.
