= Black Knight (rocket) =

British research ballistic missile

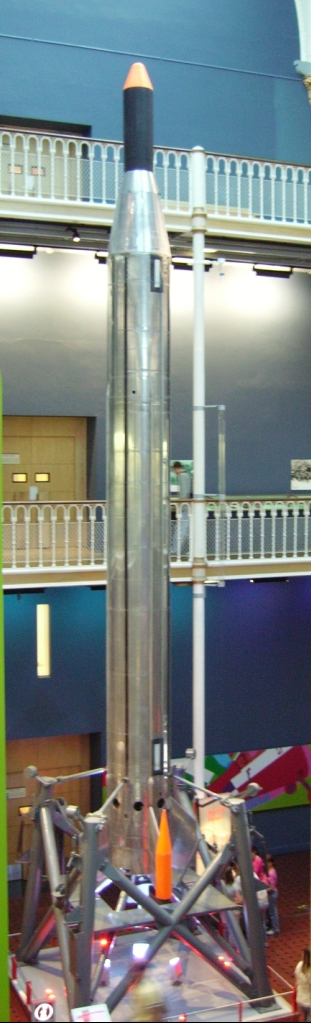
- Black Knight BK02
- Function: Vehicle for re-entry studies
- Manufacturer: Saunders-Roe
- Country of origin: United Kingdom

Size
- Height: 10.2 - 11.6 m
- Diameter: 0.91 m
- Mass: 12,500–14,200 lb
- Stages: 1 - 2

Capacity
- Payload to 800 km (Sub-orbital: 115 kg

Launch history
- Status: Retired
- Launch sites: LA-5, Woomera
- Total launches: 22
- Success(es): 22
- First flight: 7 September 1958
- Last flight: 25 November 1965

First stage - Black Knight
- Engines: Initially 4 chamber Gamma 201, later 4 chamber Gamma 301 engine.
- Thrust: from 15,600 to 21,600 lb_{f} depending on version.
- Burn time: 120-145 seconds depending on version
- Propellant: RP-1/HTP

Second stage (Optional) Cuckoo
- Engines: 1 Solid
- Thrust: 8,200 lb_{f}
- Specific impulse: 213 seconds
- Burn time: 10 seconds
- Propellant: Solid

Black Knight was a British research ballistic missile, originally developed to test and verify the design of a re-entry vehicle for the Blue Streak missile. It is the United Kingdom's first indigenous expendable launch project.

Design work on what would become the Black Knight launch vehicle commenced in 1955, being performed by the Royal Aircraft Establishment (RAE) and British manufacturer Saunders-Roe. Saunders-Roe was the principal manufacturer for the Black Knight at its facility on the Isle of Wight. On 7 September 1958, the first Black Knight was launched at Woomera in Australia. Between 1958 and 1965, a total of 22 launch vehicles were fired, none of which having suffered any major failures. After 22 launches, the Black Knight programme came to a close.

The success of the Black Knight as a cheap and successful test vehicle led to many studies being performed into further derivatives of the vehicle, including its adaption to serve as an intermediate-range ballistic missile (IRBM) and as a launch vehicle, including one proposal, which was based on the Blue Streak missile and the Black Knight, known as the Black Prince. Technology and experience gained on the Black Knight programme would contribute to the subsequent Black Arrow expendable launch vehicle programme.

== Development ==
=== Origins ===
During the early 1950s, the British government had identified the need to develop its own series of ballistic missiles due to advances being made in this field, particularly by the Soviet Union and the United States. The ballistic missile was of critical importance to developing a more effective method of nuclear deterrence, replacing the role currently occupied by free-fall nuclear bombs and thus a reliance on ever-more complex, costly and capable aircraft. A British programme to develop such a missile, named Blue Streak, was promptly initiated; however, there were key questions over the then-relatively unknown scenario of what such a vehicle would encounter when attempting re-entry to the atmosphere, there were fears that such a vehicle might simply burn up like a meteor and therefore be unachievable.

To explore the phenomenon of atmospheric entry, it was decided that a dedicated research programme would be necessary in order to acquire research information that would shape the design of subsequent ballistic vehicles. Britain had also never previously developed a ballistic missile before, the field being relatively new and with few participants, thus there was significant value in developing and constructing a research ballistic missile in order to gain experience and data on how to design and build such vehicles, develop launch techniques, and general handling. Thus, in 1955, the Black Knight research vehicle has its inception for this purpose.

In 1955, due to its close relationship with the Royal Aircraft Establishment (RAE), the British government awarded a contract to British manufacturer Saunders-Roe to produce the Black Knight. This contract involved a complete package for the design, development, manufacturing and testing of the vehicle, its flight control system, instrumentation, and supporting infrastructure for its operation.

According to author C.N Hill, the Black Knight programme ultimately fulfilled its prime objective of gathering information on rocket systems. Amongst applicable fields for the accumulated data included a greater understanding of the physics involved in re-entry vehicles, which had military value due to this scope including ballistic missiles and missile defense. Specifically, it influenced the development of the British-built Blue Streak missile programme, while generally benefitting scientific understanding in both the United Kingdom and the United States.

=== Further development and derivatives ===
The Black Knight was regarded as being a successful programme, having produced a relatively low cost and reliable rocket. While the Blue Streak missile had by this point been recognised as being too costly to serve as a competitive launcher in the face of international competition, the Black Knight was viewed as having the potential to be more cost-effective in this regard. The Royal Aircraft Establishment (RAE) had been encouraged by its performance and were keen to reuse the rocket elsewhere.

One of more radical ideas for reusing the Black Knight was voiced by Armstrong-Siddeley, who suggested that the rocket be repurposed as the foundations for an intermediate-range ballistic missile (IRBM). This proposal would have involved greatly increasing the size of the vehicle itself, and the adoption of a substantially more powerful rocket engine in place of the Gamma engine.

The RAE performed a multitude of studies on the subject of prospective derivatives of the Black Knight and its Gamma engine. Many of these focused on the possibility of extending the vehicle to operate a launcher for small satellites and proposed the use of liquid hydrogen-fuelled upper stage, which was comparatively expensive to develop while not providing much payload capacity without redesigning of the Black Knight vehicle itself as well. An alternative solution for satellite launches was explored by the RAE, in which solid fuel boosters would have been attached to the Black Knight. This proposal would have involved a basically unmodified Black Knight vehicle being paired with two strap-on boosters along with two further stages in order to be capable of placing a 100lb payload into a 200-mile-high orbit. While this implementation was found to be simple and low-cost to develop, the payload capacity remained low.

One of the more ambitious proposals for an improved Black Knight involved substantially increasing the diameter of the tank from 36 inches to 54 inches, which had the effect of nearly doubling the rocket's fuel capacity, along with the adoption of a more powerful solid fuel second stage, named Kestrel. This envisioned more powerful Black Knight rocket was to have been used as part of a further set of planned experiments, which had been codenamed 'Crusade'. Upon review, HM Treasury refused to provide any funding for further Black Knight projects, and work on an enlarged Black Knight was abandoned in favour of the larger Black Arrow satellite launcher.

== Design ==
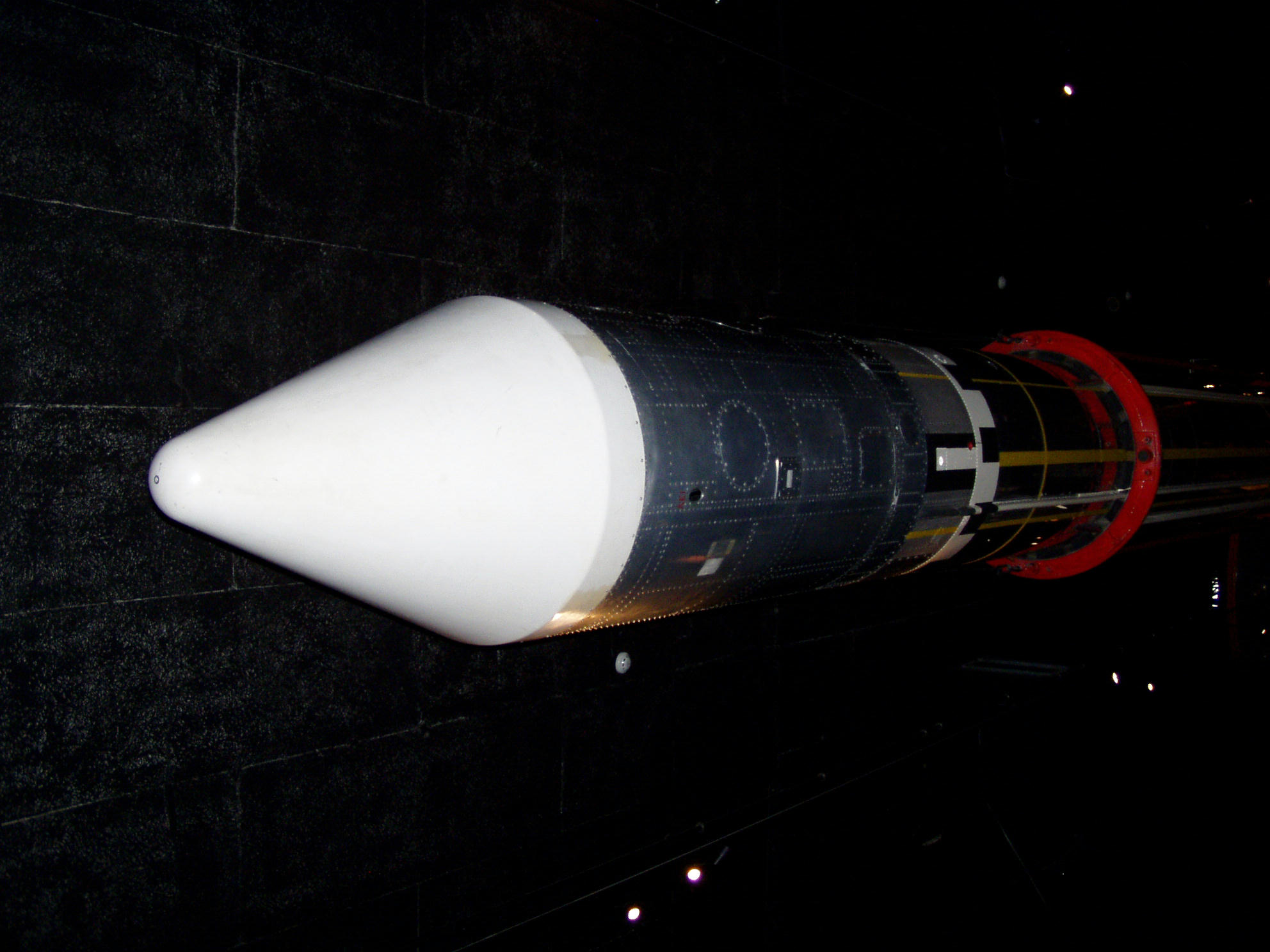
Nose cone of Black Knight BK10.

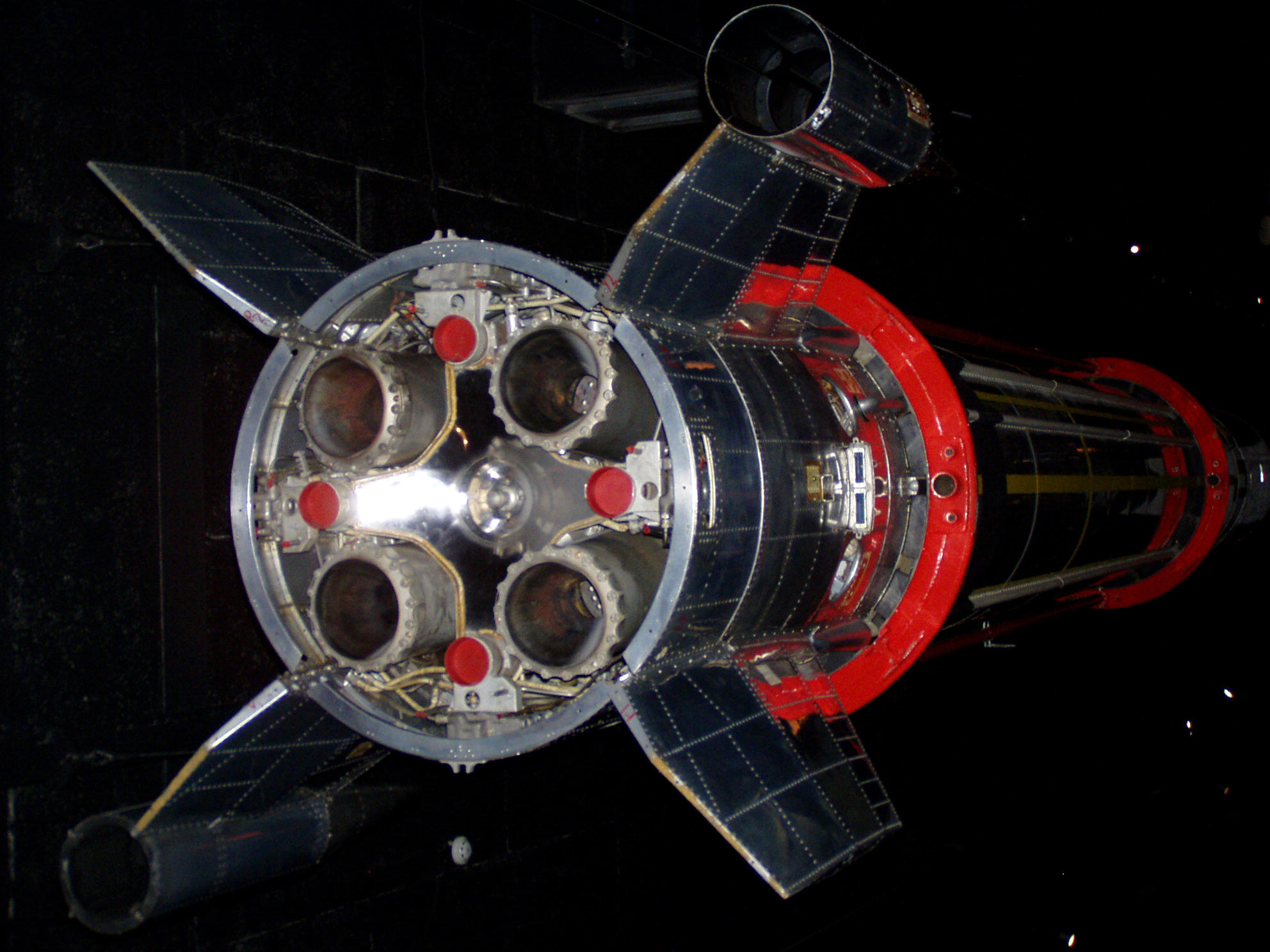
Rear of Black Knight BK10 - note the engine nozzles and aerodynamic fins.

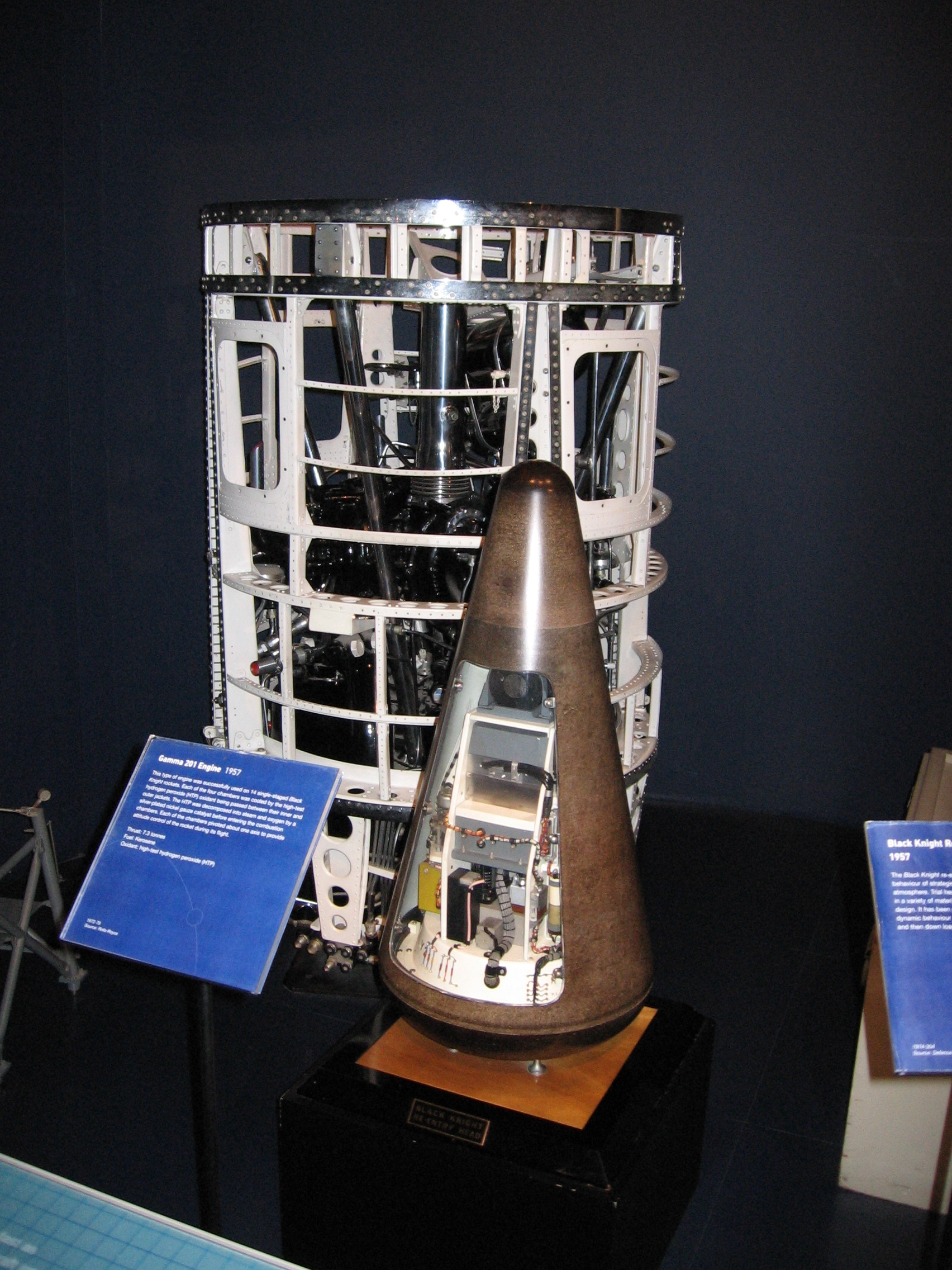
Gamma 201 engine and re-entry head of the Black Knight rocket

The Black Knight was a single stage ballistic missile, complete with a separate nose section. The vehicle was 35 feet long, had a 3-foot diameter, and a fully-fuelled weight of 12,800lb. In operation, the Black Knight could attain an altitude of up to 600 miles, and achieve a re-entry velocity of 12,000 feet per second.

The Black Knight was powered by the Bristol Siddeley Gamma rocket engines. The Gamma engine was designed and manufactured by Armstrong-Siddeley at their factory in Ansty, near Coventry. Between 1956 and 1959, the Gamma rocket engines underwent testing at the High Down Rocket Test Site under the direction of under Paul Leyton. The engine ran a fuel comprising a combination of high-test peroxide (HTP) and kerosene; Saunders-Roe possessed prior experience of working with this fuel mixture as a result of the firm's work on the Saunders-Roe SR.53 rocket propelled interceptor aircraft.

== Versions ==
There were five Black Knight design versions, depending on the engines used on the first and second stages.

Variant	Stage 1	Stage 2
Black Knight-201	Gamma-201	None
Black Knight-201 Cuckoo-1B	Gamma-201	Cuckoo-1B
Black Knight-201 Cuckoo-2	Gamma-201	Cuckoo-2
Black Knight-301 Cuckoo-1B	Gamma-301	Cuckoo-1B
Black Knight-301 Cuckoo-2	Gamma-301	Cuckoo-2

== Firings ==
During 1957, the first test launch of the Black Knight rocket was performed at High Down on the Isle of Wight. In September 1958, the second test launch was performed, this being the first to use the dedicated launch facility at the Woomera Test Range, Australia; the majority of Black Knight launches were performed from Woomera, leading to the launchers being constructed in the UK and then transported to Australia.

The first two launch vehicles were used as 'proving rounds' - that is, launches which lacked any payload in order to test and validate the design of the rocket itself. The third launch of the Black Knight was the first to carry an actual payload in the form of a re-entry vehicle, which was present for the purpose of testing the properties of the re-entry body's chosen design. All the re-entry firings deliberately took place on clear moonless nights, so that the luminous wake of the re-entry body could be observed photographically.

Further firings with different heads showed up some unusual phenomena, and further tests under the code names Gaslight and Dazzle were carried out in conjunction with the United States. A variety of heads were flown in these tests, including a plain copper sphere and a silica sphere. Heads composed of a composite asbestos-based material known as Durestos were also flown, and later tests finalised on a cone-shaped head re-entering pointed-end first, as used on many subsequent missile RVs.

A total of 25 Black Knight launch vehicles were constructed at a cost of just over £40,000 each. A single rocket (BK02) was used for ground testing. One (BK11) was expended as part of the European Launcher Development Organisation (ELDO) initiative as an investigation of range facilities. The majority, 21, were fired as part of re-entry experiments; if they had been used as launch vehicles for satellites, the majority of these firing would have been successfully attained orbit.

All launches of the Black Knight were successful and there were no major failures experienced during any. Authors Robin Paine and Roger Syms summarised this achievement as: "Altogether, 22 successful launches were made without a single failure - a remarkable record without parallel in ballistics rocket development.

== Survivors ==
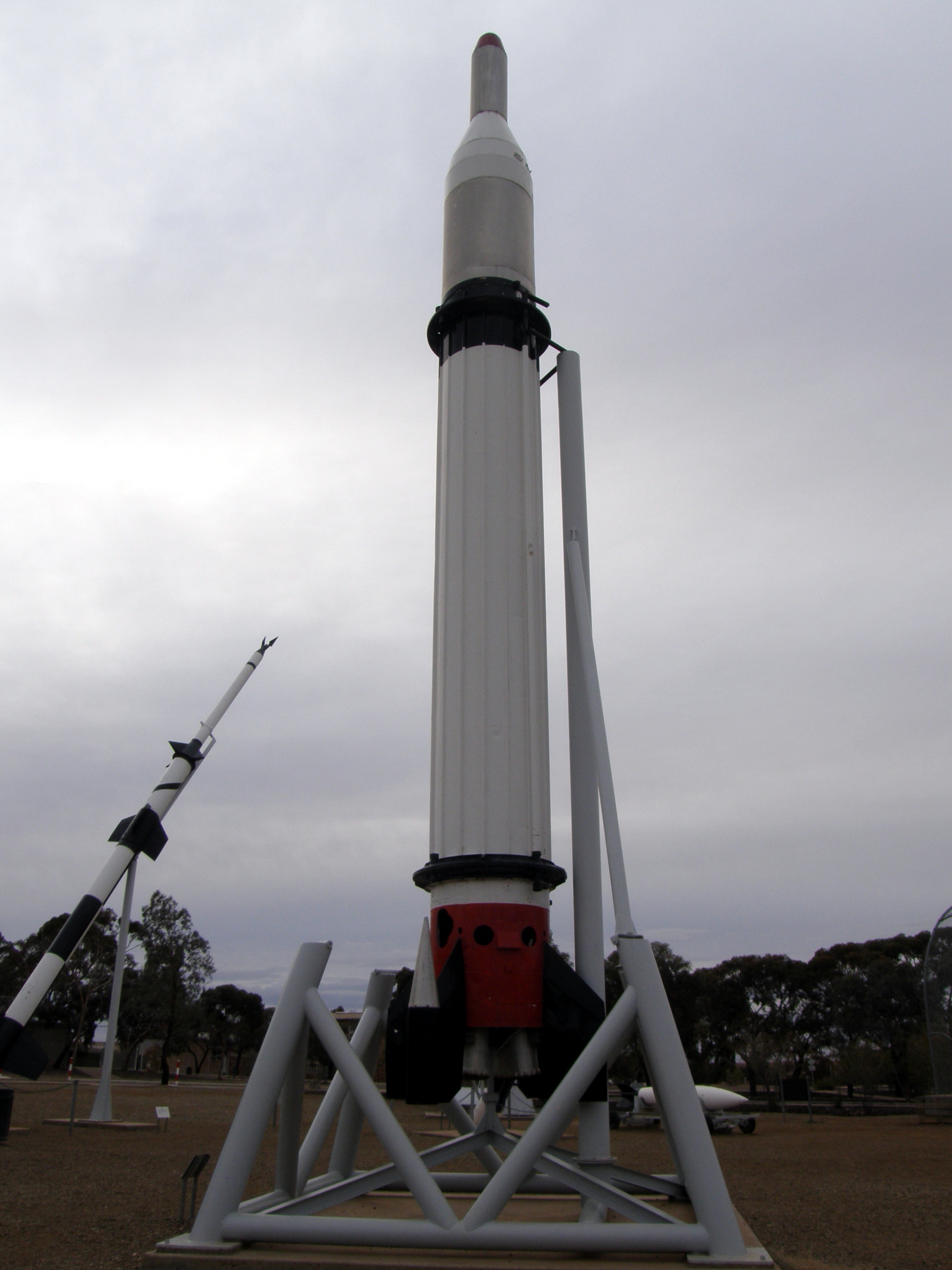
A Black Knight rocket on static display at Woomera.

Three Black Knight rockets were preserved and are now kept on static display in museums.

- Black Knight BK02 is on display at the Royal Museum Connect Gallery in Edinburgh, Scotland. It is nearly 11m high and stretches up for three floors.
- Black Knight BK10 is on display at the World Museum in Liverpool, England. It is suspended from the ceiling near the Planetarium, with other Black Knight components on display nearby.
- A Black Knight (probably BK22) is on display at the Woomera Aircraft & Missile Park.

== Launches ==
Black Knight was launched twenty-two times from Woomera LA-5.

Black Knight launches
Date	Serial No.	Version	Launch site	Mission
07.09.1958	BK01	Black Knight-201	LA-5A	R&D
12.03.1959	BK03	Black Knight-201	LA-5A	R&D
11.06.1959	BK04	Black Knight-201	LA-5A	R&D
29.06.1959	BK05	Black Knight-201	LA-5A	R&D
30.10.1959	BK06	Black Knight-201	LA-5A	R&D
24.05.1960	BK08	Black Knight-201 Cuckoo-1B	LA-5A F	Project Gaslight (failure)
21.06.1960	BK09	Black Knight-201 Cuckoo-1B	LA-5A	Project Gaslight
25.07.1960	BK07	Black Knight-201	LA-5A	Project Gaslight
07.02.1961	BK13	Black Knight-201	LA-5A	Project Gaslight
09.05.1961	BK14	Black Knight-201 Cuckoo-1B	LA-5B	Project Gaslight (failure)
07.06.1961	BK17	Black Knight-201 Cuckoo-1B	LA-5	Project Gaslight (failure)
01.05.1962	BK15	Black Knight-201	LA-5	Project Gaslight
24.08.1962	BK16	Black Knight-301 Cuckoo-1B	LA-5	Project Gaslight
29.11.1962	BK18	Black Knight-301 Cuckoo-1B	LA-5	Project Gaslight
17.10.1963	BK11	Black Knight-201	LA-5	ELDO Blue Streak Test
11.03.1964	BK12	Black Knight-201 Cuckoo-2	LA-5	Project Dazzle
05.08.1964	BK19	Black Knight-301 Cuckoo-2	LA-5	Project Dazzle
06.11.1964	BK20	Black Knight-301 Cuckoo-2	LA-5	Project Dazzle
21.04.1965	BK21	Black Knight-301 Cuckoo-2	LA-5	Project Dazzle
26.07.1965	BK23	Black Knight-301 Cuckoo-2	LA-5	Project Dazzle
28.09.1965	BK24	Black Knight-301 Cuckoo-2	LA-5	Project Dazzle
25.11.1965	BK25	Black Knight-301 Cuckoo-2	LA-5	Project Dazzle

== See also ==
- Rainbow Codes
- Black Arrow
- Blue Streak
- Skylark
