= Woomera Prohibited Area =

Australian military testing site

Coordinates: 30°0′0″S 134°0′0″E

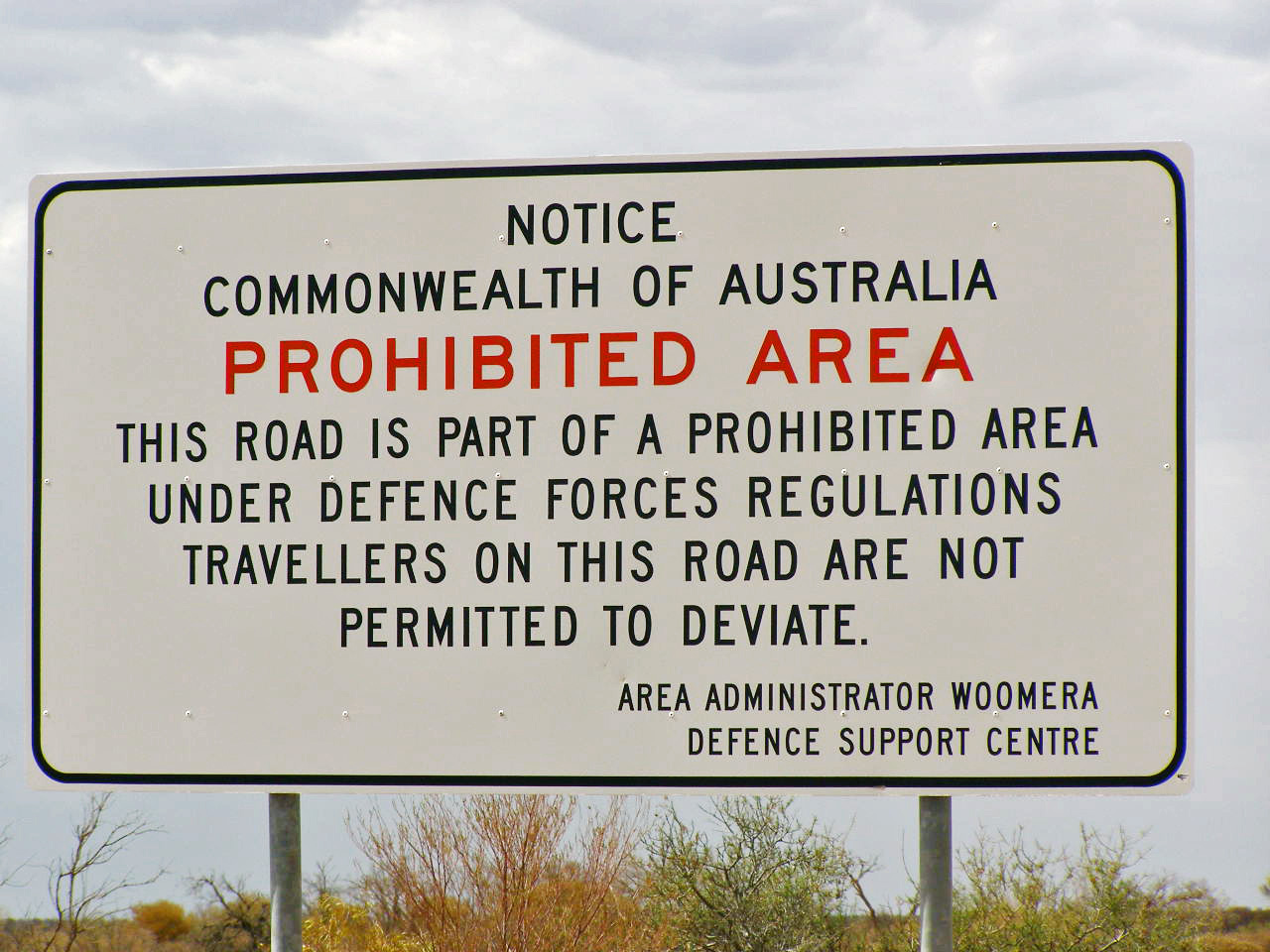
The Stuart Highway passes through the Woomera Prohibited Area

Woomera Prohibited Area (WPA) is a prohibited area in central South Australia, with its south-eastern corner located approximately 450 kilometres (280 mi) north north-west of Adelaide. The Woomera Prohibited Area has an area of 127,000 square kilometres (49,000 sq mi). With an area roughly the size of England, it restricts access to RAAF Woomera Range Complex, the largest land-based defence and aerospace range in the world.

== Geography ==
Woomera Prohibited Area is an arid desert, and although there are some salt lakes, sand dunes, and mesa hills, most of the terrain comprises featureless stones ("gibber") or scrub plains. The town of Woomera was established to serve the people working at the WPA.

== History and operations ==
The WPA is declared under Australian Defence Force regulations as a prohibited area for the purposes of the testing of war materiel. From time to time other Defence approved activities, such as sounding rocket launches, are also conducted. For this reason, sketching or mapping the area without permission is prohibited. Despite this, satellite photography of the entire area is currently (November 2010) available for view on Google Earth.

The Stuart Highway passes through the Prohibited Area, but travellers cannot deviate from the road nor enter the Prohibited Area. From time to time the Stuart Highway may be closed by use of roadblocks in order to allow range activity. Such restrictions are usually of short duration (several hours) and public warning notices are issued. Other roads or tracks entering the WPA are signposted as to unauthorised entry. Members of the public traversing the Anne Beadell Highway from Coober Pedy to Emu Junction must obtain two permits to pass through it.

Within the WPA, there are sites of significance to indigenous people. Damage to or removal of items from these sites is punishable by law. Parts of rockets and motors, projectiles, or unexploded ammunition can also be seen in the WPA. The Japanese space mission Hayabusa returned to Earth with a sample of material from the asteroid 25143 Itokawa on June 13, 2010. Its reported landing zone was inside the Woomera Prohibited Area.

== See also ==
- British nuclear tests at Maralinga (part of the Woomera Prohibited Area)
- Nurrungar
- Woomera Airfield
- Woomera Test Range
