= De Havilland Sprite =

1950s British aircraft rocket engine

Sprite/Super Sprite
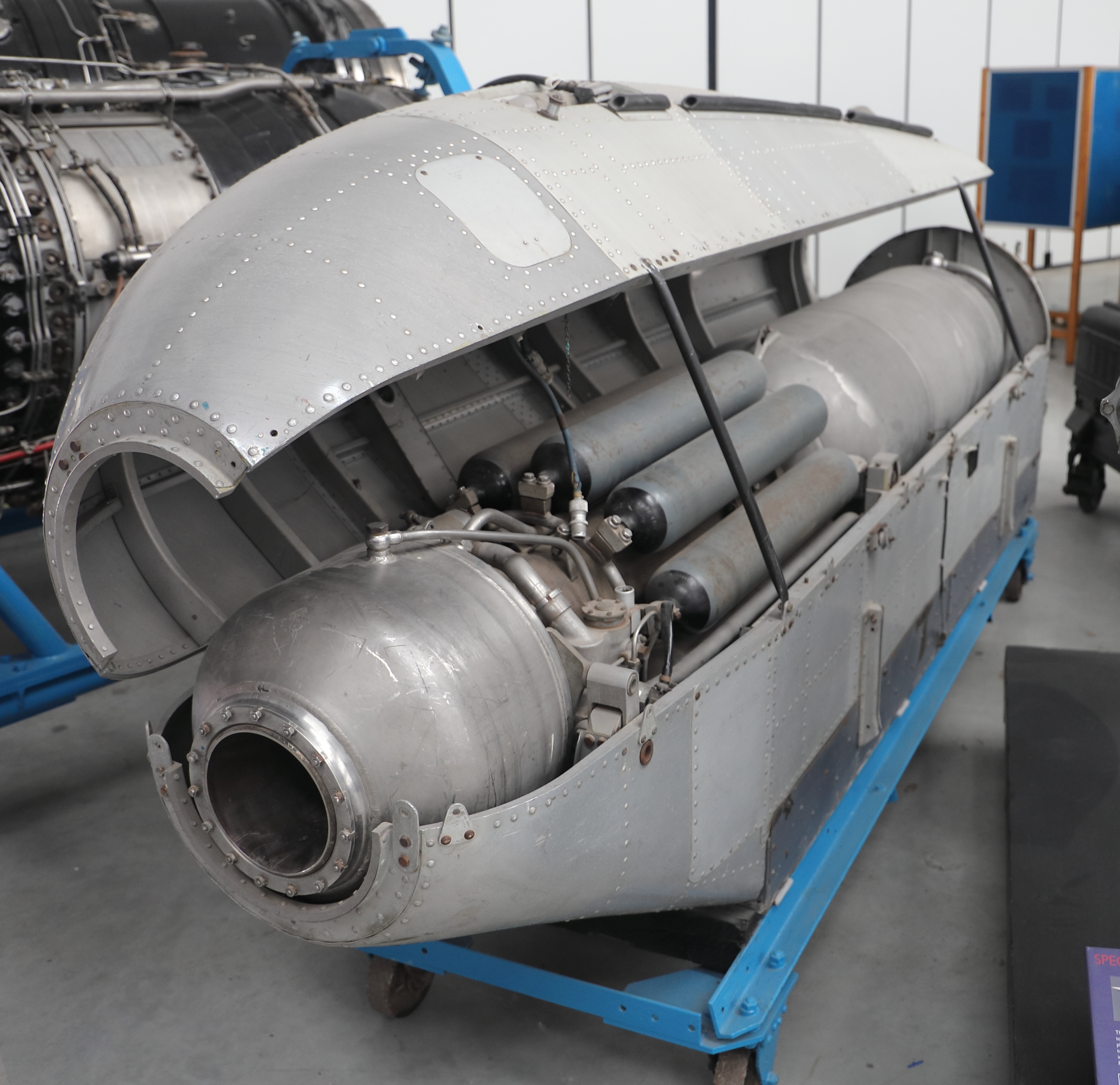
- de Havilland Super Sprite on display at the de Havilland Aircraft Museum
- Type: Rocket engine
- National origin: United Kingdom
- Manufacturer: de Havilland Engine Company
- First run: May 1951 (first flight)

The de Havilland Sprite is a British rocket engine that was built by de Havilland in the early-1950s for use in RATO (Rocket-assisted take off) applications. A developed engine with slightly less thrust but a longer burn time was known as the Super Sprite, production ceased in October 1960.

== Design and development ==
For RATO use only a short burn time is required, with simplicity and light weight as major virtues. The intended market was for assisting take-off of de Havilland Comet 1 airliners (as hot and high operations in the British Empire were considered important) and also for V bombers carrying heavy nuclear weapons. 30 successful test flights were carried out by Comets, from May 1951, but gas turbine performance improved rapidly, and so RATO was not required in service.

A hydrogen peroxide monopropellant was used, decomposed into oxygen and steam over a metallic calcium catalyst. The maximum thrust was 5,000 lbf (22 kN), varying over the 16 second burn time for a total impulse of 55,000 lbf (240 kN) seconds.

A technology update then took place with the proving of silver-plated nickel gauze packs as catalysts with the establishment of optimum loadings and flows. This practice was replicated in all future applications with the catalyst no longer consumed.

In April 1952 the DSpr.2 proved this modification impressively in Comet demonstrations with clean exhaust. The next stage was pursued with the Super Sprite (DSpr.4) following the ATO development precedent with 'hot' operation but now enhanced in simplicity by ability to inject kerosene fuel once chamber pressure was established by the catalysed peroxide flow. The units, flight approved in August 1953, reverted to the practice of being parachuted after firing for routine re-use in service operations with the Vickers Valiant V bomber.

== Variants ==
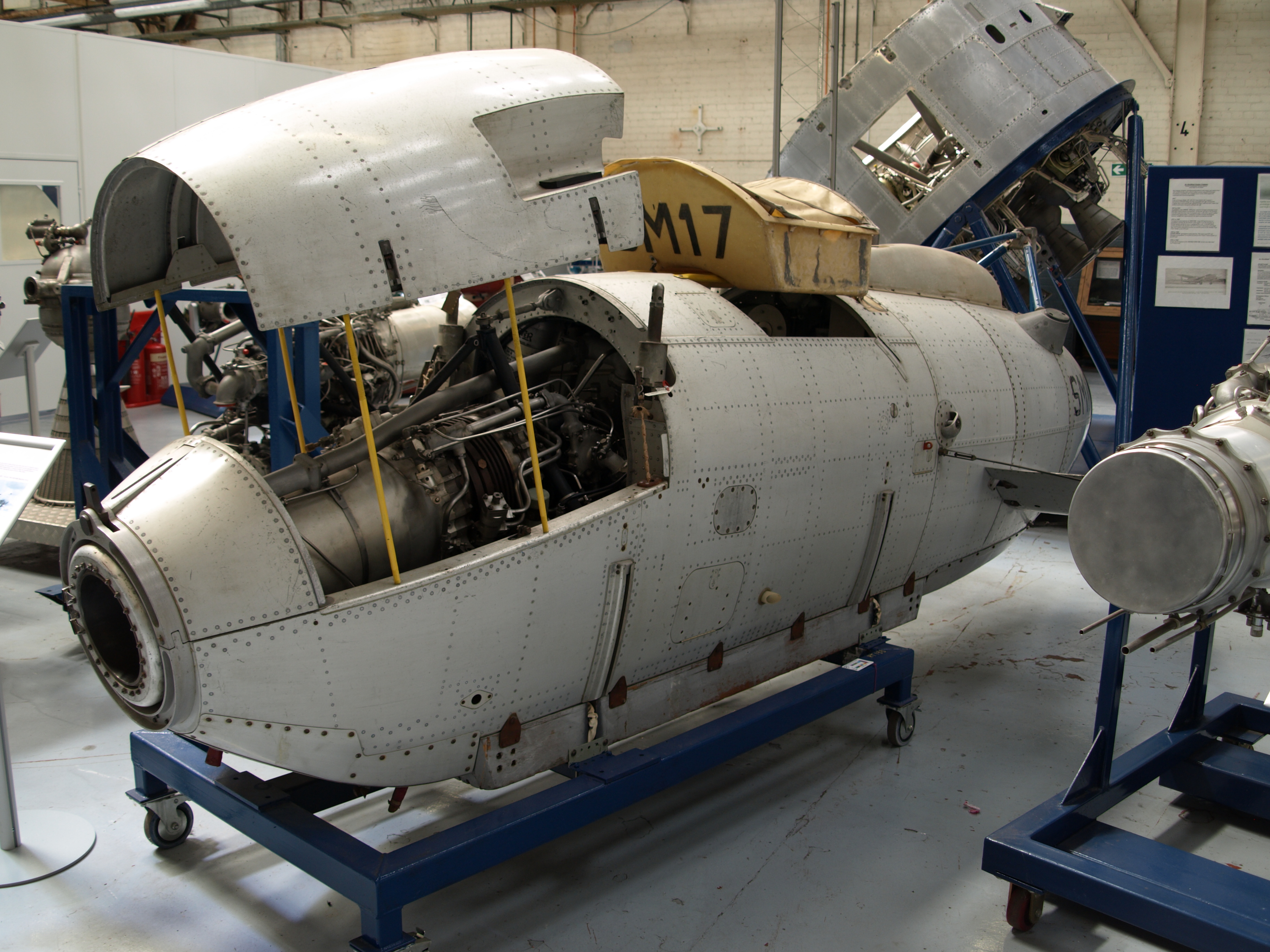
Nacelle-mounted Super Sprite with jettison recovery parachute on display at the Rolls-Royce Heritage Trust, Derby

Sprite DSpr.1
Sprite DSpr.2
Silver-plated nickel-gauze catalyst, tested in Comets during April 1952
Sprite DSpr.3
Super Sprite DSpr.4

=== Super Sprite ===
The Super Sprite was a re-development of the Sprite application, using a significantly different 'hot' propellant technology, that of hydrogen peroxide / kerosene. Although the peak thrust was reduced to 4,200 lbf (18.68 kN) burn time was 2.5 times longer at 40 seconds, with a proportionate increase in total impulse.

For simplicity, there were no fuel pumps and the tanks were pressurised by nitrogen from nine cylinders wrapped around the combustion chamber. The Super Sprite was packaged as a self-contained engine in its own nacelle, jettisoned after take-off and retrieved by parachute. Inflatable air bags cushioned its impact with the ground. To obtain a clean separation from the carrier aircraft, the production engines fitted to the Vickers Valiant had a small canard vane at the nose, pitching the nacelle downwards on separation.

De Havilland regarded the 166 Super Sprite units manufactured as a standard production item, supported by their service department alongside piston and turbojet engines. It was the first rocket engine to gain formal type approval.

The Super Sprite project was cancelled in October 1960, at a reported total cost of £850,000.

== Applications ==
- de Havilland Comet
- Vickers Valiant

== Specifications (Sprite (DSpr.l)) ==
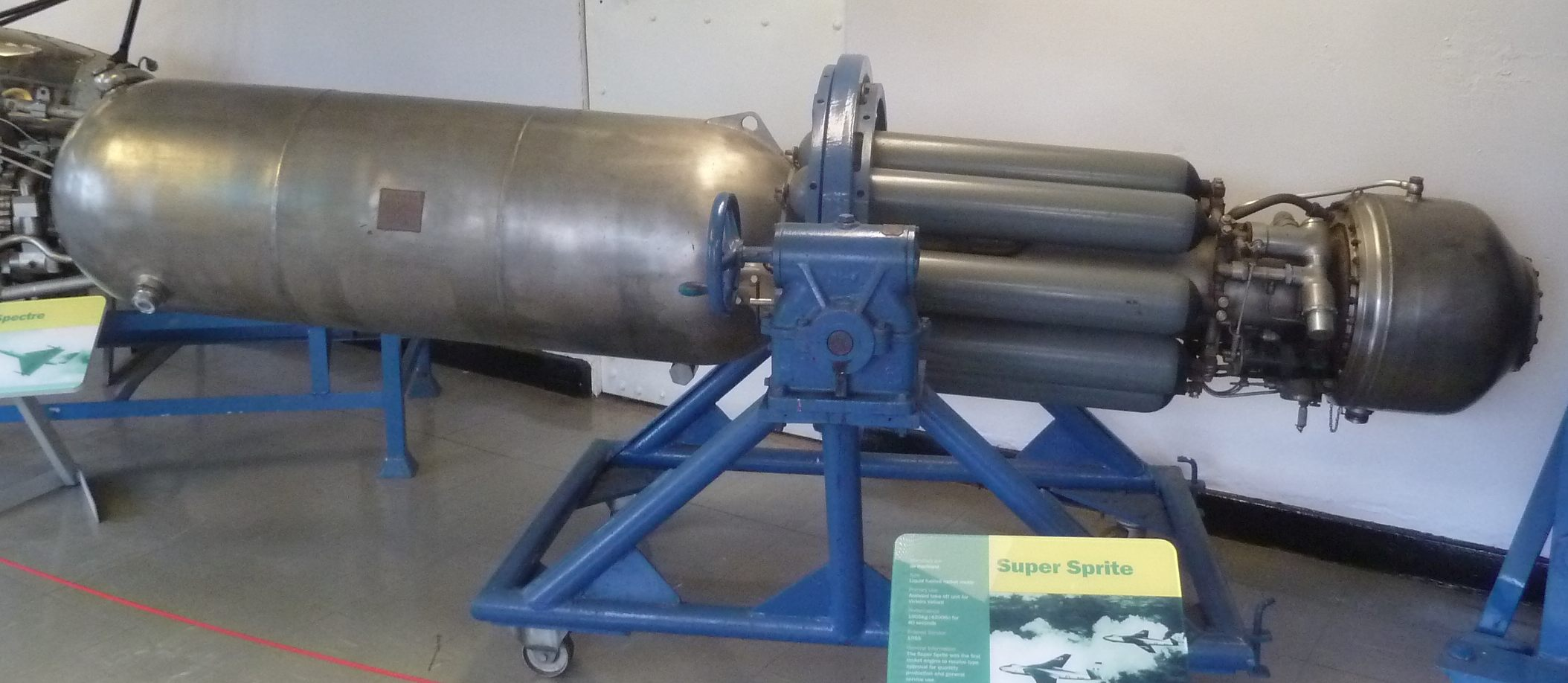
Super Sprite at the Royal Air Force Museum Midlands

=== General characteristics ===
- Type: Walter cold cycle rocket engine
- Length:
- Diameter:
- Dry weight: 350 lb (159 kg)
- Propellant capacity: 39 gal (177 L)
- Fuel: Hydrogen peroxide monopropellant

=== Components ===
- Pumps:

=== Performance ===
- Thrust: 5,000 lb (22 kN)
- Burn time: 16 seconds
- Burn time: 16 seconds
- Total impulse: 55,000 lbf-seconds

== See also ==
Related development

- de Havilland Spectre

Comparable engines

- Bristol Siddeley 605
- Napier Scorpion

Related lists

- List of aircraft engines
