= Napier Scorpion =

1950s British aircraft rocket engine

Scorpion
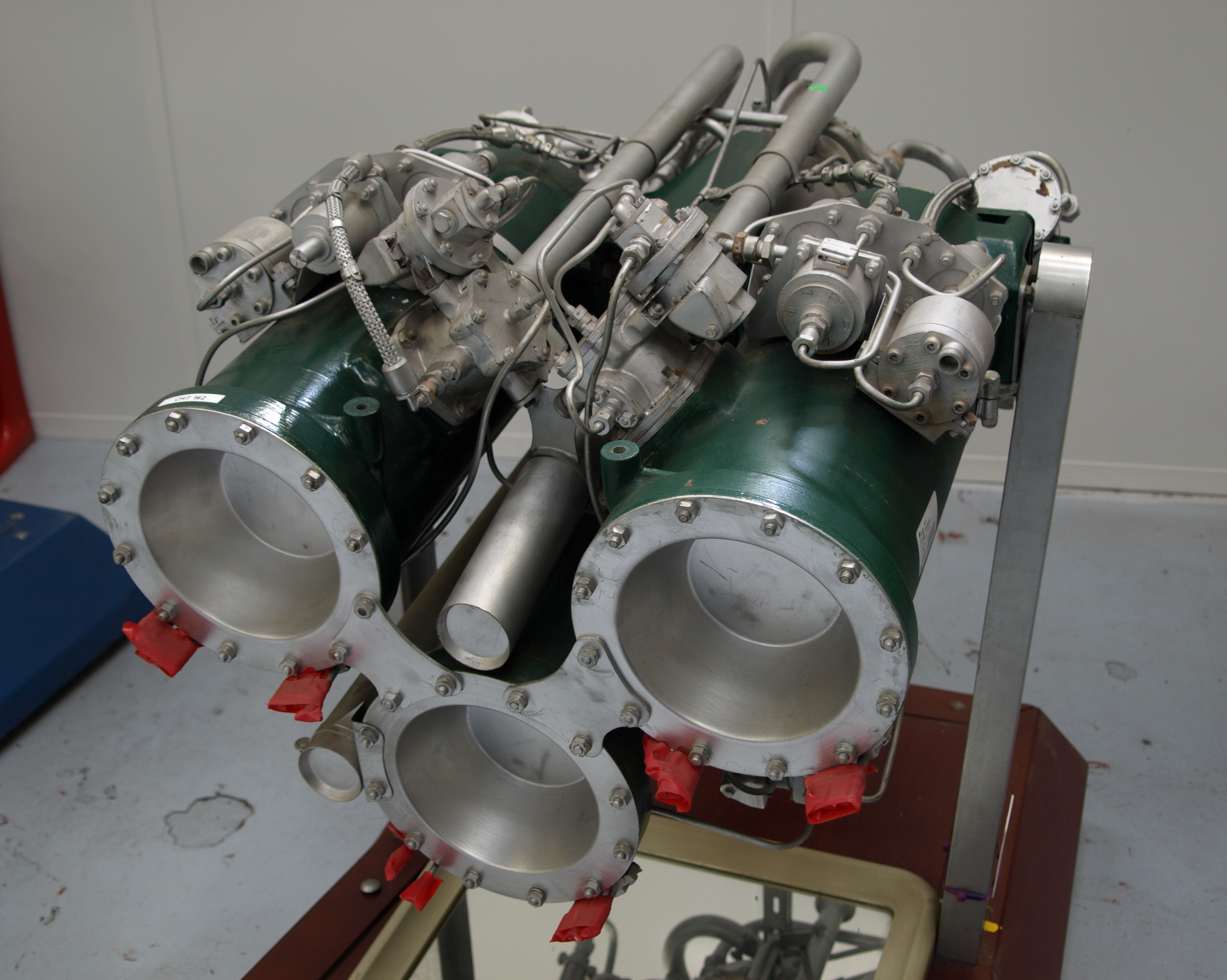
- Triple Scorpion engine on display at the Rolls-Royce Heritage Trust, Derby
- Type: Rocket engine
- National origin: United Kingdom
- Manufacturer: Napier & Son
- First run: 19 May 1956

The Napier Scorpion series of rocket engines are a family of British liquid-fuelled engines that were developed and manufactured by Napier at the Napier Flight Development Establishment, Luton, in the late 1950s. The Scorpion range were designed and flight tested as boosters to improve aircraft take-off performance.

== Design and development ==
After World War II the Air Ministry issued specifications for a wide variety of rocket engines, both liquid and solid-fuelled. Napier responded with the design of a liquid-fuelled rocket which used catalysed hydrogen peroxide (H_{2}O_{2}), in the form of High-Test Peroxide (HTP) as oxidiser and Kerosene as fuel.

The Scorpion was a regeneratively-cooled HTP (High Test Peroxide/Kerosene) bi-propellant rocket engine. Fuel and oxidiser were pumped by a single shaft turbo-pump driven by super-heated steam, generated by catalysing HTP. Engine starting was achieved by an electric pump supplying HTP to the turbo-pump decomposition chamber. Once started, a bleed off the turbo-pump oxidiser outlet fed the turbo-pump decomposition chamber to maintain flow of fuel and oxidiser. Due to the single-shaft turbo-pump operating both fuel and oxidiser pumps, flow of fuel and oxidiser were automatically maintained at the correct ratio. The Kerosene fuel is ignited thermally by the super-heated steam from HTP, decomposed by passing over a catalyst in a decomposition chamber, which is injected simultaneously into the combustion chamber.

First run on 19 May 1956, the N.Sc.1 Scorpion was also fired in the air on the following day, mounted in the bomb-bay of an English Electric Canberra B.2.

=== Double Scorpion ===
The Double Scorpion engine was simultaneously developed with the single-chamber Scorpion, consisting of two Scorpion engines mounted together with each unit individually controllable, developing double the thrust. From 1956 Double Scorpion engines were fitted experimentally to three Canberra light bombers, to improve high altitude performance. On 28 August 1957 WK163, fitted with a Double Scorpion, broke the world altitude record, exceeding 70,000 ft (21,000 m).

The Double Scorpion was also considered for use in the English Electric P.1A interceptor (which gave rise to the Lightning) and Aerojet General was chosen for projected United States production.

=== Triple Scorpion ===
A triple-chamber version was also developed as the Napier Triple Scorpion, emerging as a Double Scorpion with a third chamber mounted centrally under the other two.

=== Cancellation ===
The Scorpion project was cancelled in February 1959, at a reported total cost of £1.25 million.

== Variants ==
Scorpion NSc.1
Initial development single-chamber engine.

Double Scorpion NScD.1
Double-chamber engine.

Triple Scorpion NScT.1
Triple-chamber engine.

== Engines on display ==
A sectioned Napier Double Scorpion engine is on display at the Royal Air Force Museum London. Another Napier Double Scorpion engine is on display at the Solent Sky Museum Southampton.

== Specifications (Double Scorpion) ==
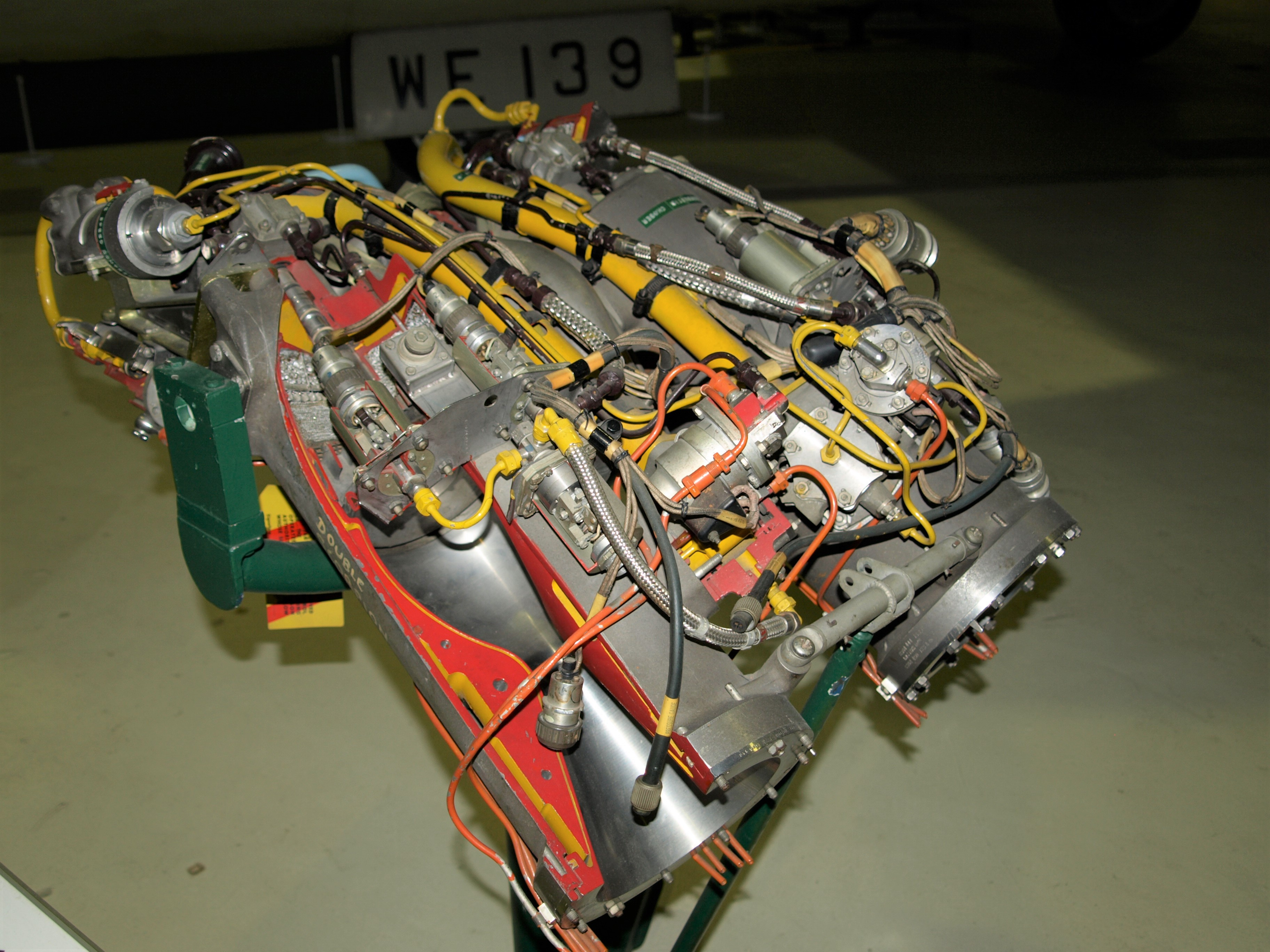
Double Scorpion on display at the Royal Air Force Museum London

=== General characteristics ===
- Type: Liquid-propellant rocket engine
- Length: 33.7 in (856 mm)
- Diameter: 23 in (584 mm)
- Dry weight: 216 lb (98 kg)
- Fuel: Kerosene
- Oxidiser: Hydrogen peroxide

=== Components ===
- Pumps: Super-heated steam turbo-pump

=== Performance ===
- Thrust: 8,000 lbf (35.6 kN)
- Burn time:

== See also ==
Comparable engines

- Bristol Siddeley 605
- de Havilland Spectre

Related lists

- List of aircraft engines
