= Larch (rocket engine) =

Rocket Engine by Rolls-Royce

- Country of origin: United Kingdom
- Application: 1st stage booster
- Predecessor: Gamma 8

Liquid-fuel engine
- Propellant: Hydrogen peroxide / kerosene

Performance
- Thrust, sea-level: 7,500 lbf (33 kN)

The Larch was a family of rocket engine intended as an upgrade to Black Arrow launch vehicles. They were manufactured by Rolls-Royce between 1965 and 1971. They burned kerosene fuel and hydrogen peroxide.
