= Bristol Siddeley BS.605 =

1960s British aircraft rocket engine

BS.605
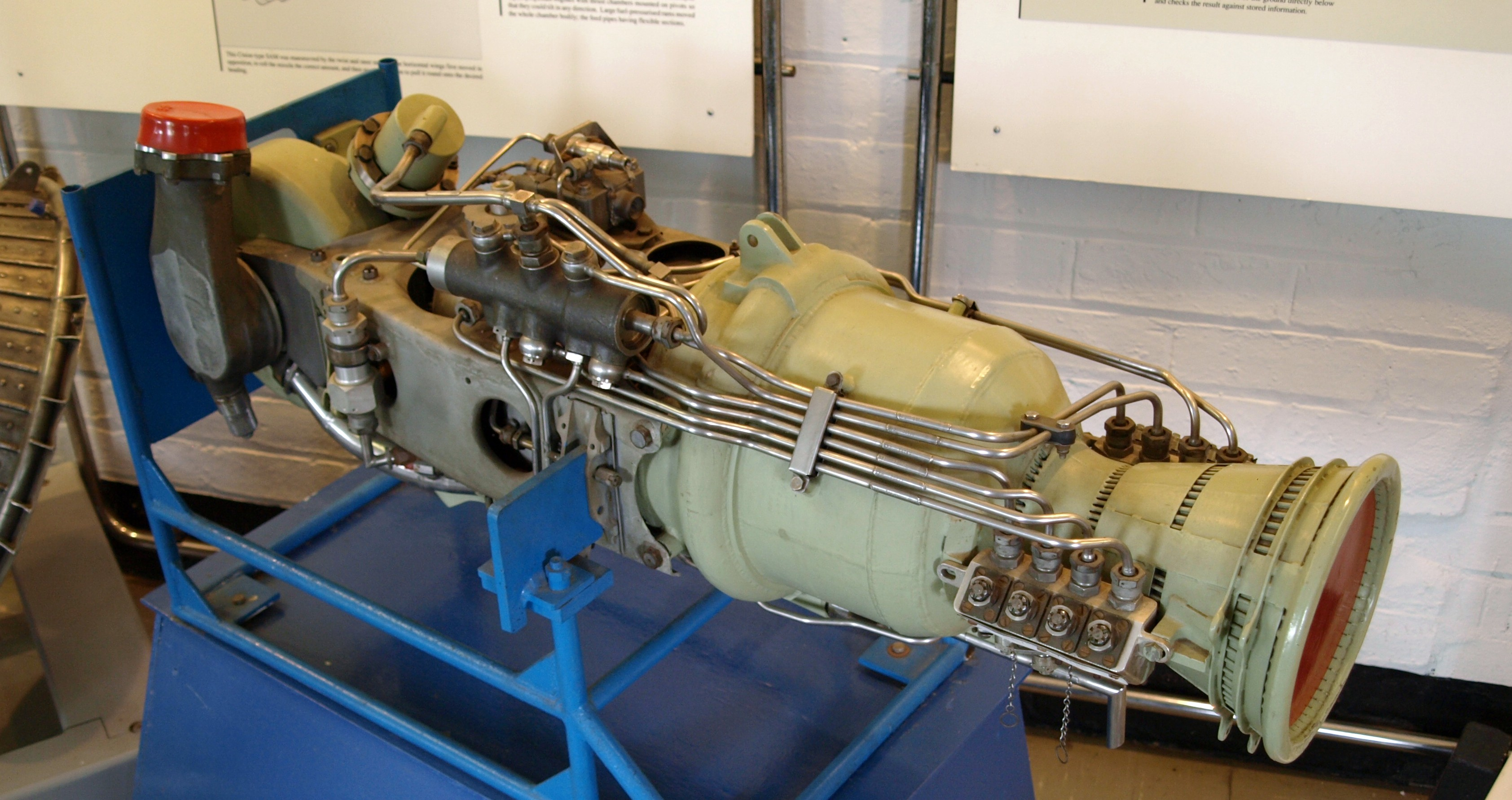
- BS.605 on display at the Royal Air Force Museum Cosford
- Type: RATO rocket engine
- National origin: United Kingdom
- Manufacturer: Bristol Siddeley
- First run: 14 March 1965
- Major applications: Blackburn Buccaneer
- Developed from: Armstrong Siddeley Stentor

The Bristol Siddeley BS.605 was a British take off assist rocket engine of the mid-1960s that used hydrogen peroxide and kerosene propellant.

== Design and development ==
The BS.605 design was based on the smaller of two combustion chambers of the earlier Armstrong Siddeley Stentor. A pair of retractable BS.605 engines were fitted to Buccaneer S.50 strike aircraft of the South African Air Force for hot and high operations. The BS.605 was also considered for the Bluebird CMN-8, a design for a supersonic land speed record car, to be driven by Donald Campbell.

== Applications ==
- Blackburn Buccaneer S.50

== Engines on display ==
- A complete BS.605 and exploded working parts of a second engine are on display at the Midland Air Museum.
- A preserved BS.605 is part of the engine collection on display at the Royal Air Force Museum Cosford.
- A preserved BS.605 is part of the engine collection on display at the Rolls-Royce Heritage Trust in Derby.

== Specifications ==
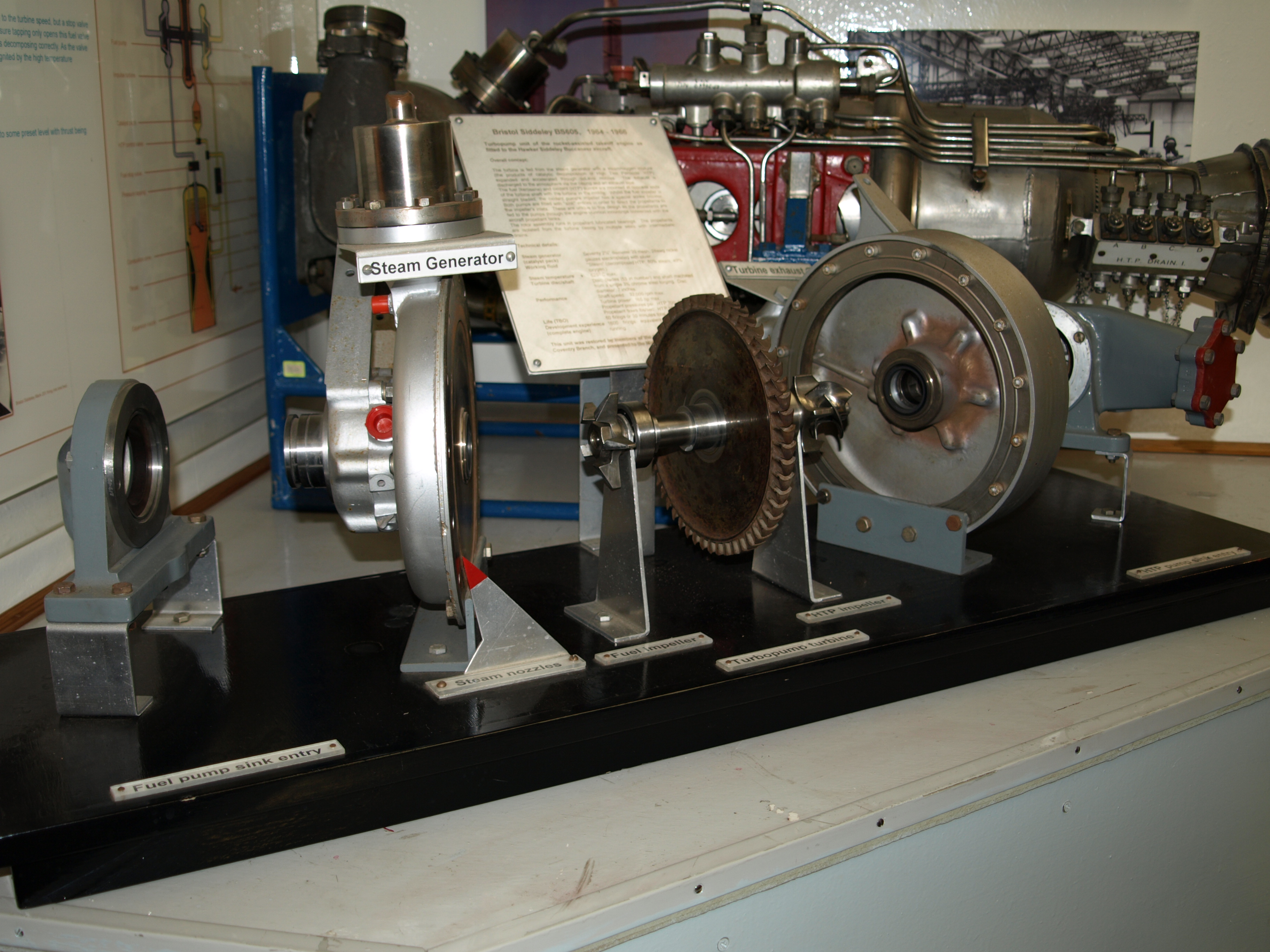
Working parts on display at the Midland Air Museum

Data from

=== General characteristics ===
- Type: Rocket engine
- Length: 42 in (1,067 mm)
- Diameter: 12 in (305 mm)
- Dry weight: 366 lb (166 kg)
- Fuel: Hydrogen peroxide/Kerosene

=== Components ===
- Pumps:

=== Performance ===
- Thrust: 4,000 lbf (18 kN) for 30 seconds Rated at 8,000 lbf (35.6 kN)
- Burn time:

== See also ==
Related development

- Armstrong Siddeley Stentor

Comparable engines

- de Havilland Spectre
- Napier Scorpion
- Rocketdyne AR2

Related lists

- List of aircraft engines
