= Armstrong Siddeley Stentor =

1950s-60s British missile rocket engine

Stentor
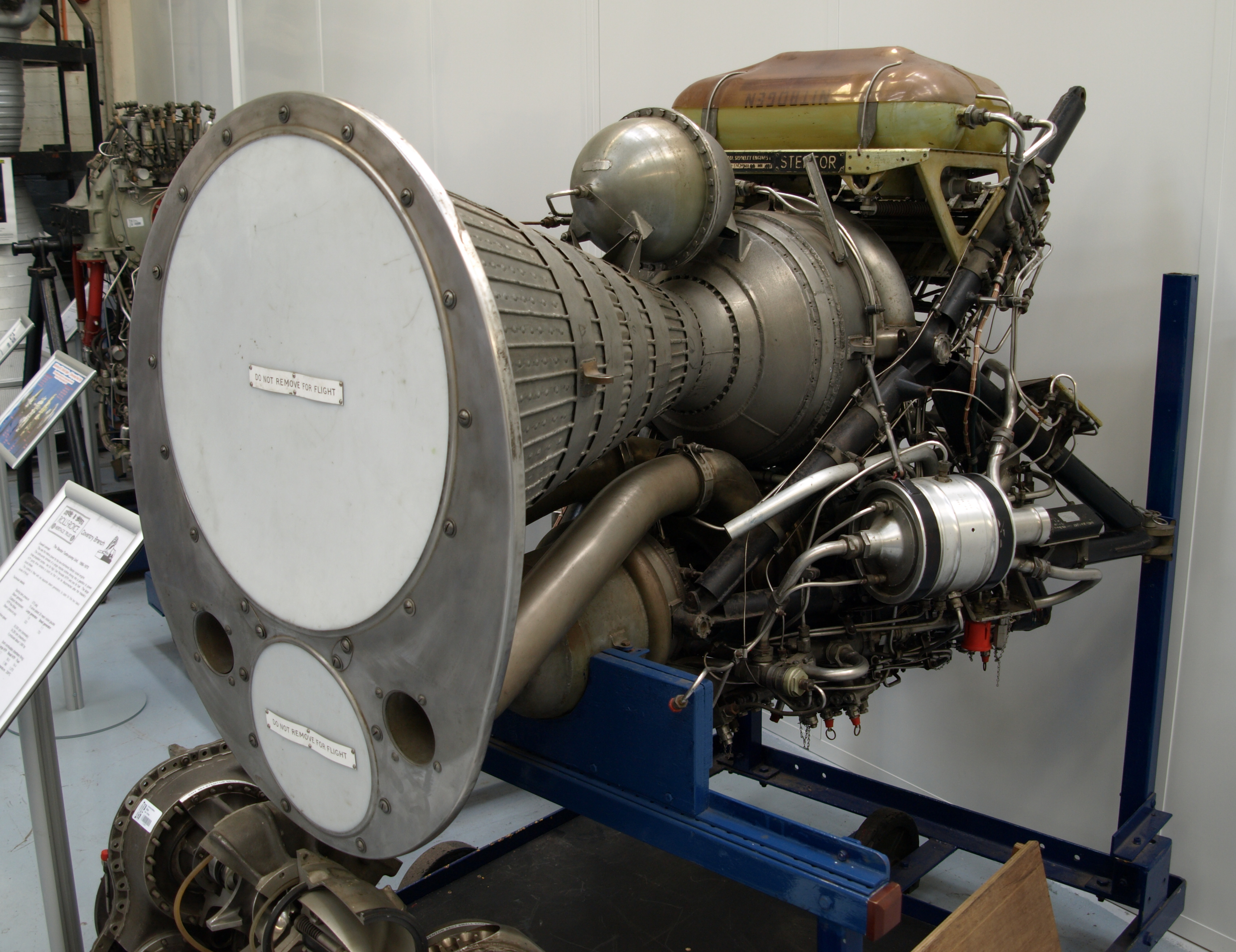
- Stentor rocket engine showing the large main nozzle (top) and the smaller cruise nozzle (bottom)
- Type: Rocket engine
- National origin: United Kingdom
- Manufacturer: Armstrong Siddeley
- First run: c.1960
- Major applications: Blue Steel missile

The Armstrong Siddeley Stentor, latterly Bristol Siddeley BSSt.1 Stentor, was a two-chamber HTP rocket engine used to power the Blue Steel stand-off missile carried by Britain's V bomber force. The high thrust chamber was used for the first 29 seconds, after which it was shut down and a smaller cruise chamber was used for the rest of the powered flight.

== Design and development ==
It was fuelled by hydrogen peroxide with kerosene.

The engine incorporated an integral tubular mounting frame which was attached by six lugs to the rear bulkhead of the missile airframe, the complete engine being enclosed in a tube-shaped fairing with the nozzles at the rear.

== Applications ==
- Blue Steel missile

== Engines on display ==
Preserved Stentor engines are on display at the following museums:

- Royal Air Force Museum Cosford
- Midland Air Museum
- The University of Liverpool – On display at the Brodie Tower foyer of the Department of Engineering.
- South Yorkshire Aircraft Museum, Doncaster
- Newark Air Museum, Nottinghamshire
- Cambridge Science Centre, Cambridge

== Specifications ==
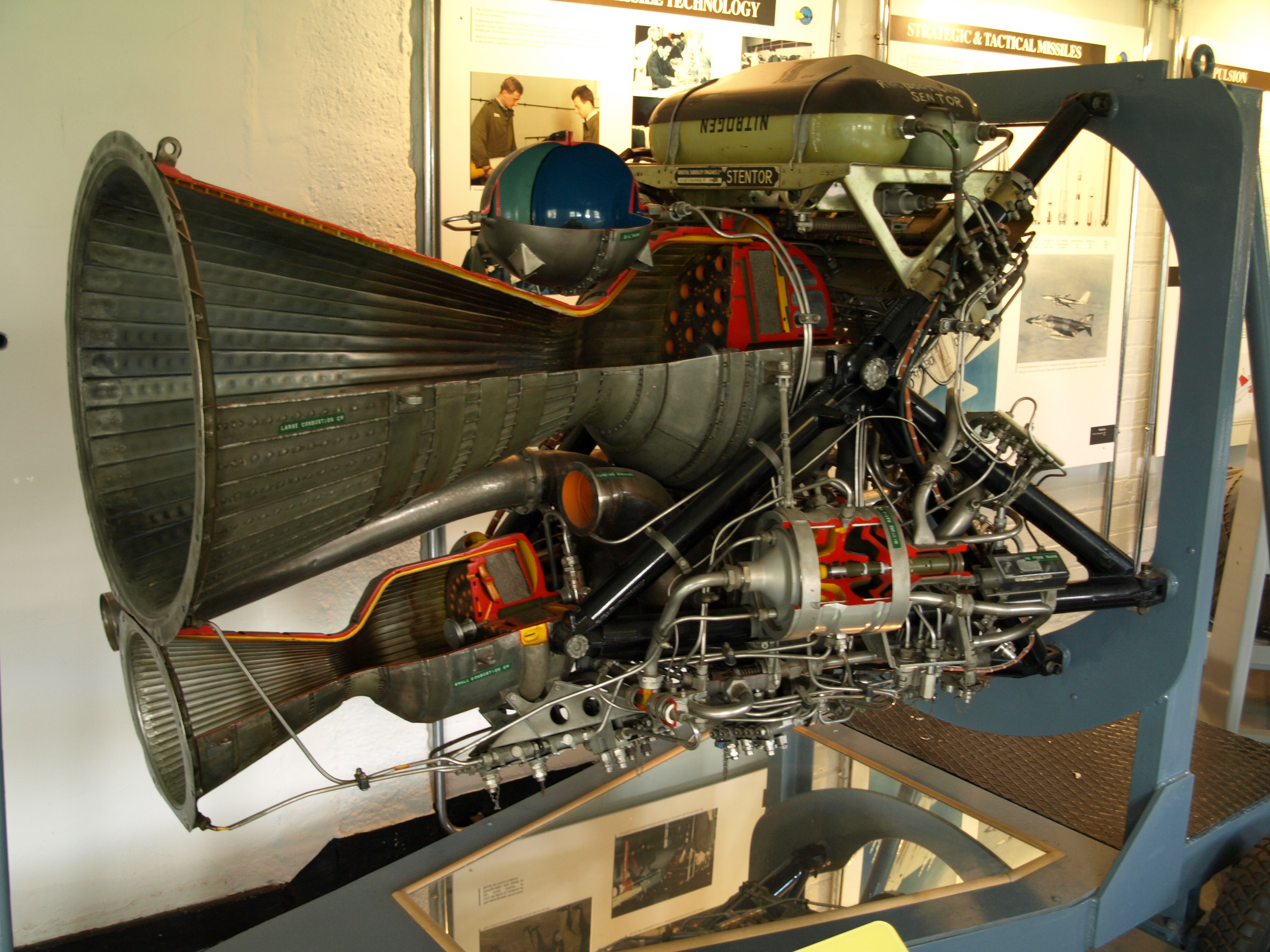
Cut-away Stentor on display at the Royal Air Force Museum Cosford

Data from

=== General characteristics ===
- Type: two chamber liquid-propellant rocket engine
- Length: 58 in (1,473 mm)
- Diameter: 38 in (965 mm) wide, 44.5 in (1,130 mm) high
- Dry weight: 747 lb (339 kg) including oil and nitrogen
- Fuel: kerosene
- Oxidiser: hydrogen peroxide

=== Components ===
- Pumps:

=== Performance ===
- Thrust: large boost chamber rated at 24,000 lbf (110 kN)
  smaller cruise chamber rated at 6,000 lbf (27 kN)
- Burn time:
- Thrust specific fuel consumption:
- Specific impulse: ~220 seconds (2.2 km/s)

== See also ==
Related development

- Bristol Siddeley BS.605

Related lists

- List of aircraft engines
