= Bluebird Mach 1.1 =

Planned supersonic car

Overview
- Production: 0
- Designer: Ken Norris

Body and chassis
- Body style: dart-like
- Layout: paired nosewheels at the front, sft of the cockpit, with single wheels 8 ft (2.44 m) apart.

Powertrain
- Engine: Twin Bristol Siddeley BS.605 liquid-fuelled rocket engines

Dimensions
- Length: 27 ft 8 in (8.43 m)
- Width: 8 ft 6 in (2.59 m)
- Height: 3 ft 7 in (109 cm)
- Curb weight: 1,600 kg (3,500 lb) (projected)

Bluebird Mach 1.1 (CMN-8) was a design for a rocket-powered supersonic land speed record car, planned by Donald Campbell but thwarted by his subsequent death during a water speed record attempt in Bluebird K7 in early 1967.

Donald Campbell decided a massive jump in speed was called for following his successful 1964 LSR attempt in Bluebird CN7. His vision was of a supersonic rocket car with a potential maximum speed of 840 mph, referred to as Bluebird Mach 1.1. Norris Brothers were requested to undertake a design study.

Campbell, ever superstitious, chose a lucky date to hold a press conference at the Charing Cross Hotel on 7 July 1965 to announce his future record breaking plans:

... In terms of speed on the earth’s surface, my next logical step must be to construct a Bluebird car that can reach Mach 1.1. The Americans are already making plans for such a vehicle and it would be tragic for the world image of British technology if we did not compete in this great contest and win. The nation whose technologies are first to seize the “faster than sound” record on land will be the nation whose industry will be seen to leapfrog into the 70s or 80s. We can have the car on the track within three years"

Bluebird Mach 1.1 was to be rocket-powered. Ken Norris had calculated using rocket motors would result in a vehicle with very low frontal area, greater density, and lighter weight than if he went down the jet engine route. Bluebird Mach 1.1 would also be a relatively compact and simple design. Norris specified two off-the-shelf Bristol Siddeley BS.605 rocket engines. The 605 had been developed as a take-off assist rocket engine for military aircraft and was fuelled with kerosene, using hydrogen peroxide as the oxidizer. Each engine was rated at 8,000 lbf (36 kN) thrust. In Bluebird Mach 1.1 application, the combined 16,000 lbf (71 kN) thrust would be equivalent of 36,000 bhp (27,000 kW; 36,000 PS) at 840 mph (1,350 km/h).

The compact size of the rocket motors enabled Norris to design a vehicle with a very low cross-sectional area. A dart-like configuration was chosen, with two closely paired front wheels behind the nose-mounted cockpit and two rear wheels 8 ft (240 cm) apart, faired into stabilising fins. The design was expected to be inherently stable in a straight line. The main structure of the car was both elegant and simple, yet it would ensure significant torsional strength and also allow separate storage of the two liquids used as the propellant. The main chassis would be a flat box-like steel structure with internal rib strengthening (by contrast, the chassis of Bluebird CN7 was a honeycomb aluminium sandwich). This would provide the frame to which were attached the rocket engines, one above and one below, as well as the propellant tanks – hydrogen peroxide on top, kerosene underneath to keep two very volatile fuels apart. The frame would also house the torsion bar rear suspension. Clad in a slim pencil-shaped body with rear outrigger fins, the vehicle would feature a recumbent driving position. The wheels were to be machined from solid aluminium billets. As they were not required for propulsion, but merely to support the car, there would be no need for tyres.

Various dimensions were considered and eventually a full-scale mock-up of the car was built measuring 27 ft 8 in (843 cm) long, 8 ft 6 in (259 cm) wide at the rear wheels, with an overall height of just 3 ft 7 in (109 cm). Ground clearance was projected to be only 4.5 in (11 cm), giving Bluebird Mach 1.1 a very low centre of gravity and roll centre. The predicted weight was 1,600 kg (3,500 lb) including propellants. Bluebird Mach 1.1 would thus have a power-to-weight ratio of 22,000 bhp (16,000 kW; 22,000 PS) per tonne.

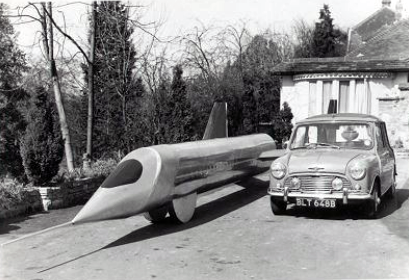
Promotional model displayed outside Campbell's house in spring 1966.

Interest in the project was such the Jamaican Government offered to construct a 14-mile (23 km) track to host the record.

After Campbell's death, the project continued at a low key for some years, still involving Leo Villa, with Norris as Design Consultant from 1968-1971. In 1973, Nigel McKnight became involved, but failed to raise the necessary sponsorship.

The model disappeared and its present whereabouts are unknown. It was possibly buried in building foundations, along with the wrecked sponsons of the Bluebird K7.

The project is little-known today, although some model makers offer replicas.

The full story of Campbell's stillborn rocket car is told in 'Donald Campbell Bluebird and The Final Record Attempt' published in late 2011.

== See also ==
- Blue Flame
