= Midland Air Museum =

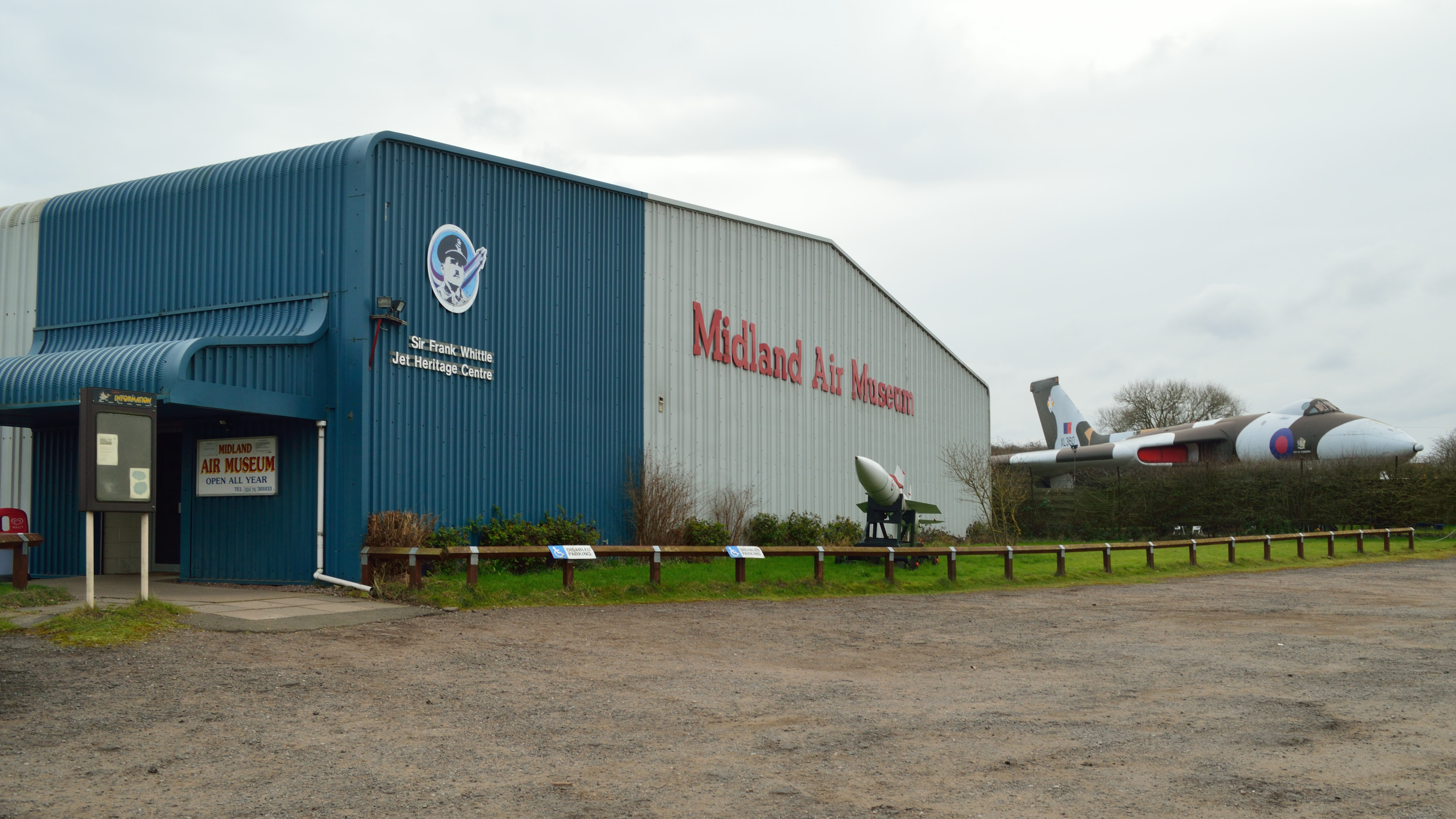
- The Sir Frank Whittle Jet Heritage Centre at the Midland Air Museum

- Location within Warwickshire
- Location: Baginton, Warwickshire
- Coordinates: 52°22′26.18″N 1°28′46.92″W
- Type: Aviation museum
- Website: www.midlandairmuseum.co.uk

The Midland Air Museum (MAM) is situated just outside the village of Baginton in Warwickshire, England, and is adjacent to Coventry Airport. The museum includes the Sir Frank Whittle Jet Heritage Centre (named after Frank Whittle, the local aviation pioneer and inventor of the jet engine), where many exhibits are on display in a large hangar. It also has a small hangar, and a fenced-off green area where many aircraft are on display in the open.

== Aircraft on display ==
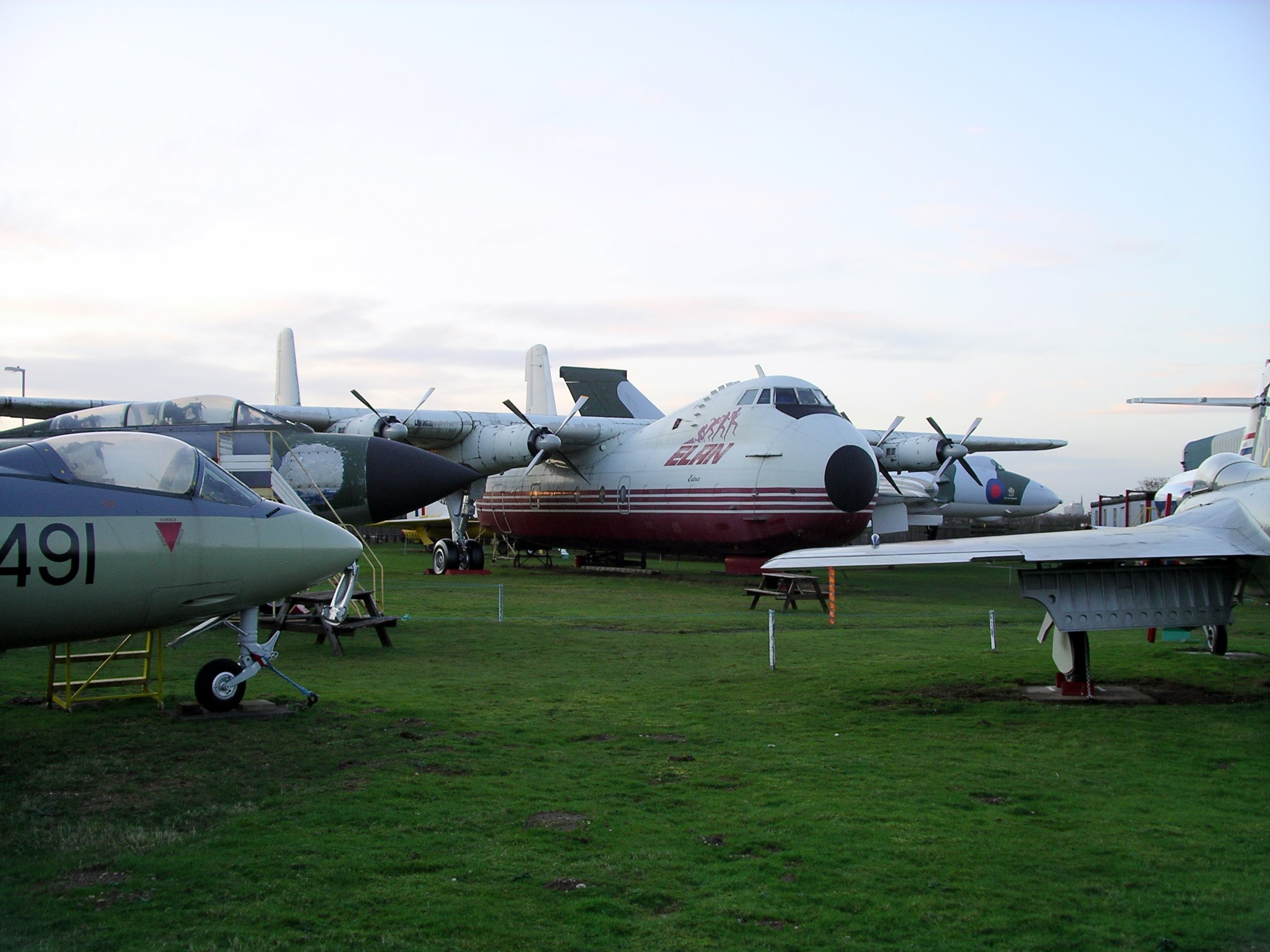
Armstrong Whitworth Argosy AW.650 (ex. registration G-APRL)

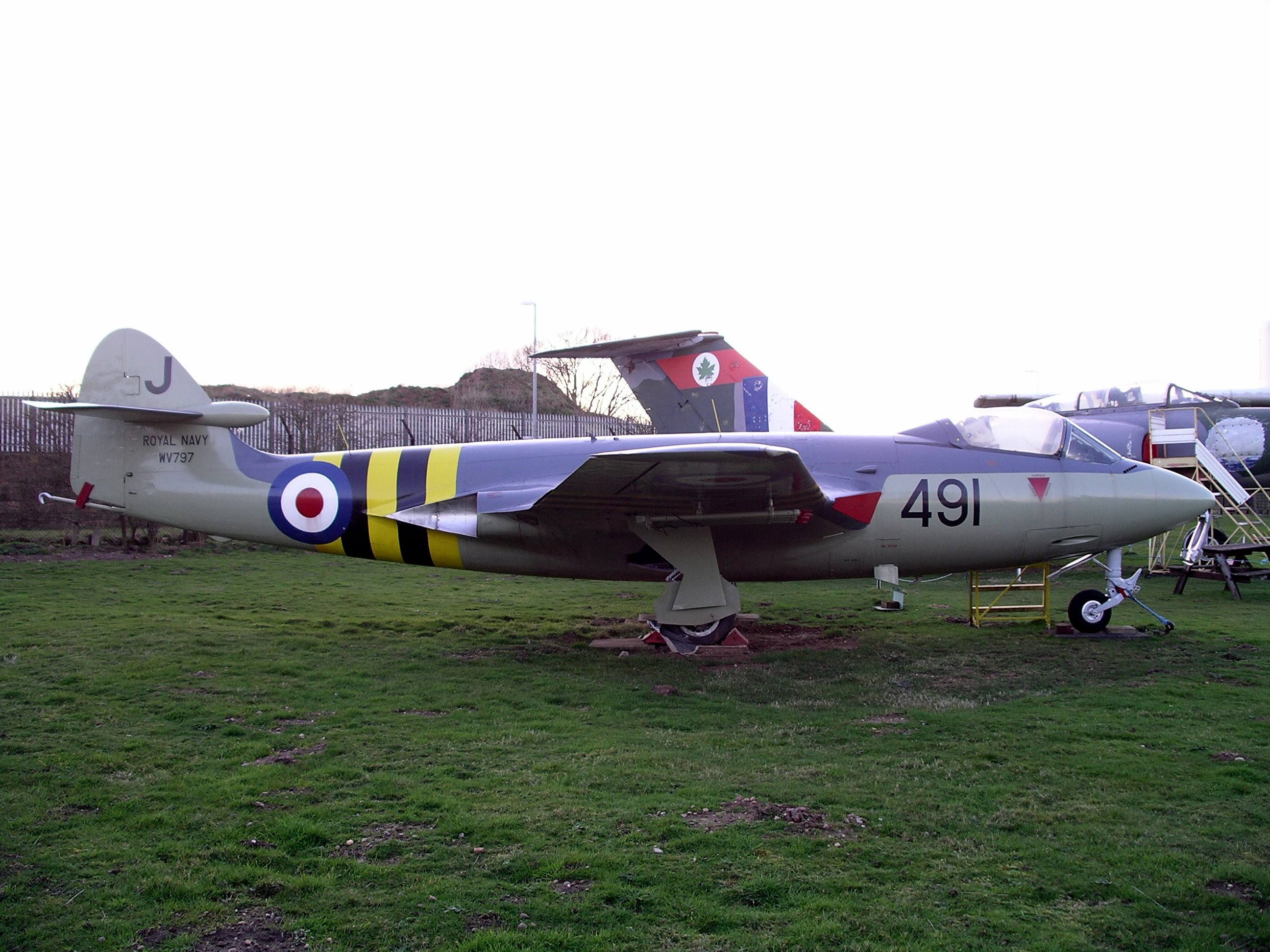
Armstrong Whitworth Sea Hawk FGA.6 (ex. serial number WV797)

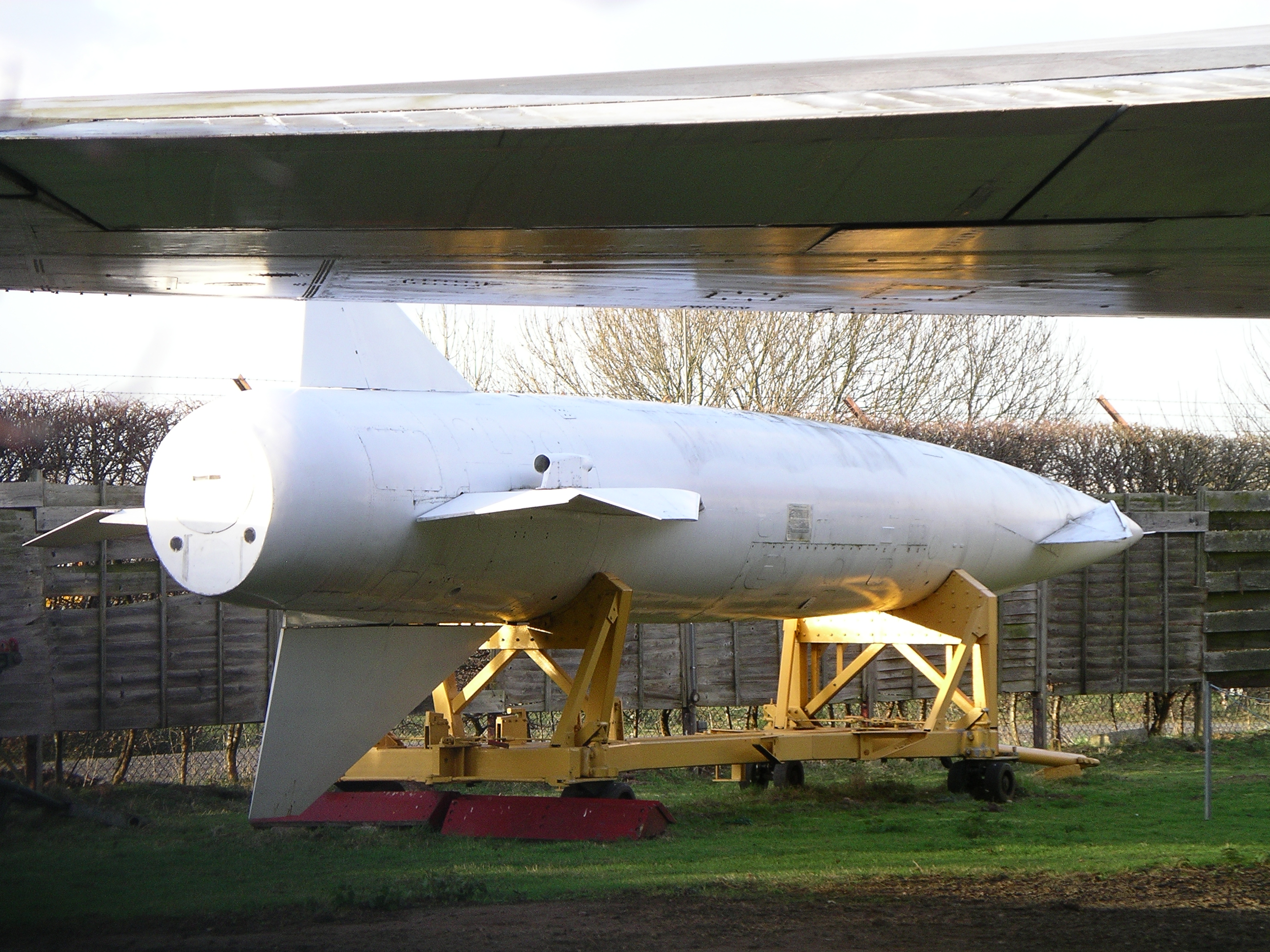
Avro Blue Steel nuclear missile (seen under Avro Vulcan wing)

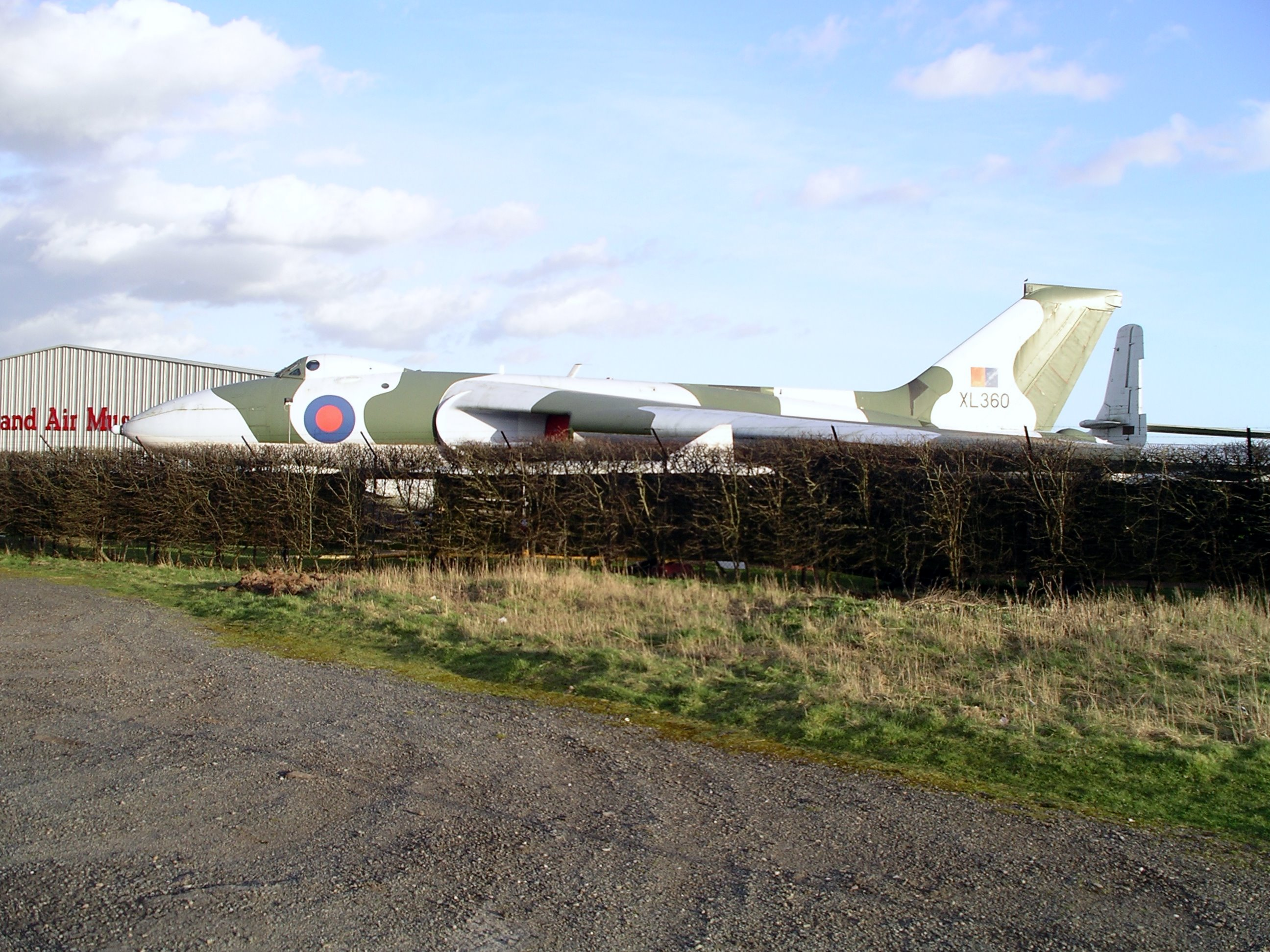
Avro Vulcan B.2 (ex. serial number XL360)

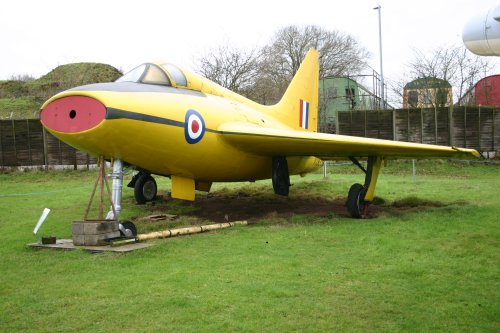
Boulton Paul BP.111A (ex. serial number VT935).

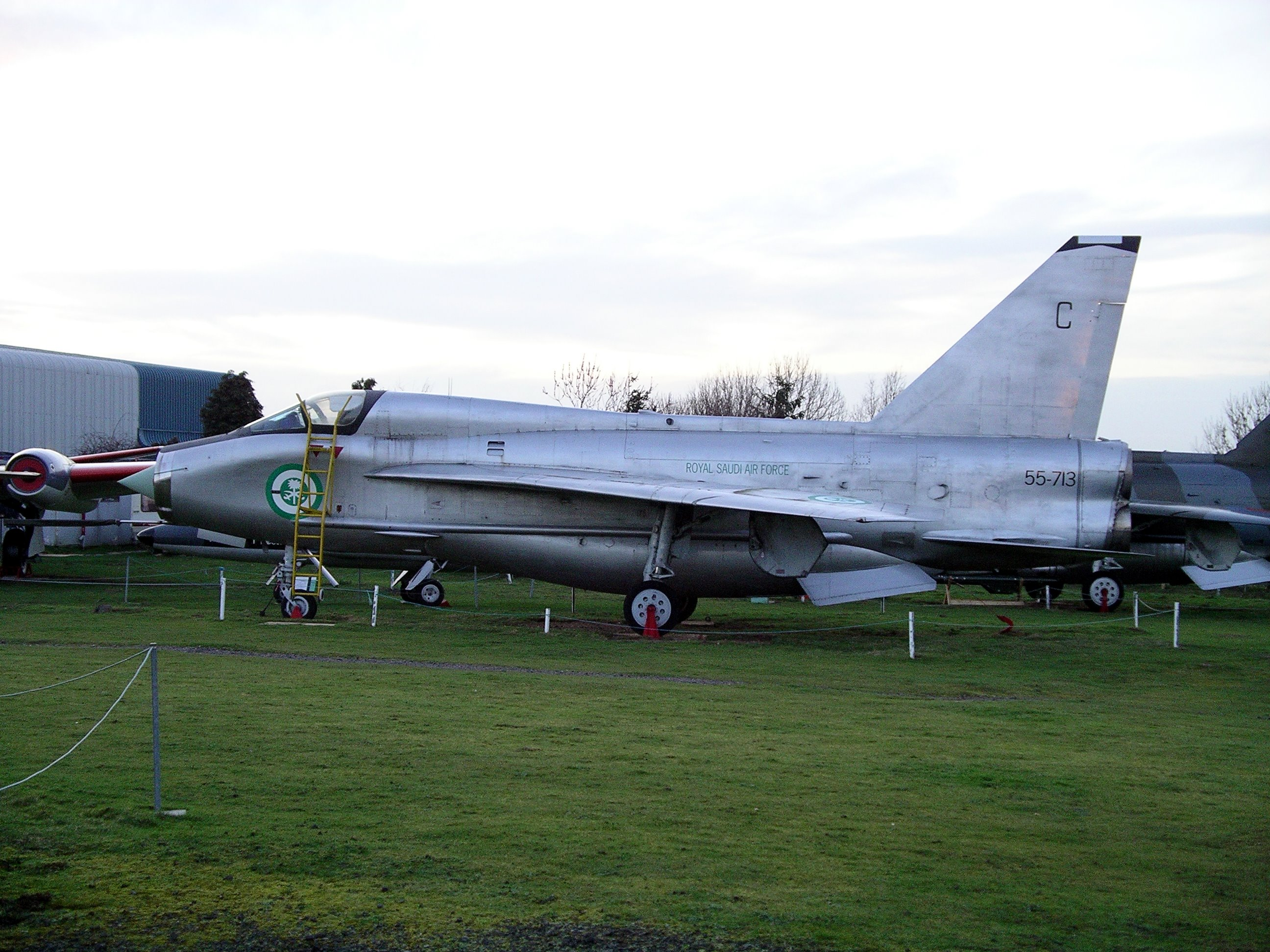
English Electric Lightning T55 (ex. serial number 55-713)

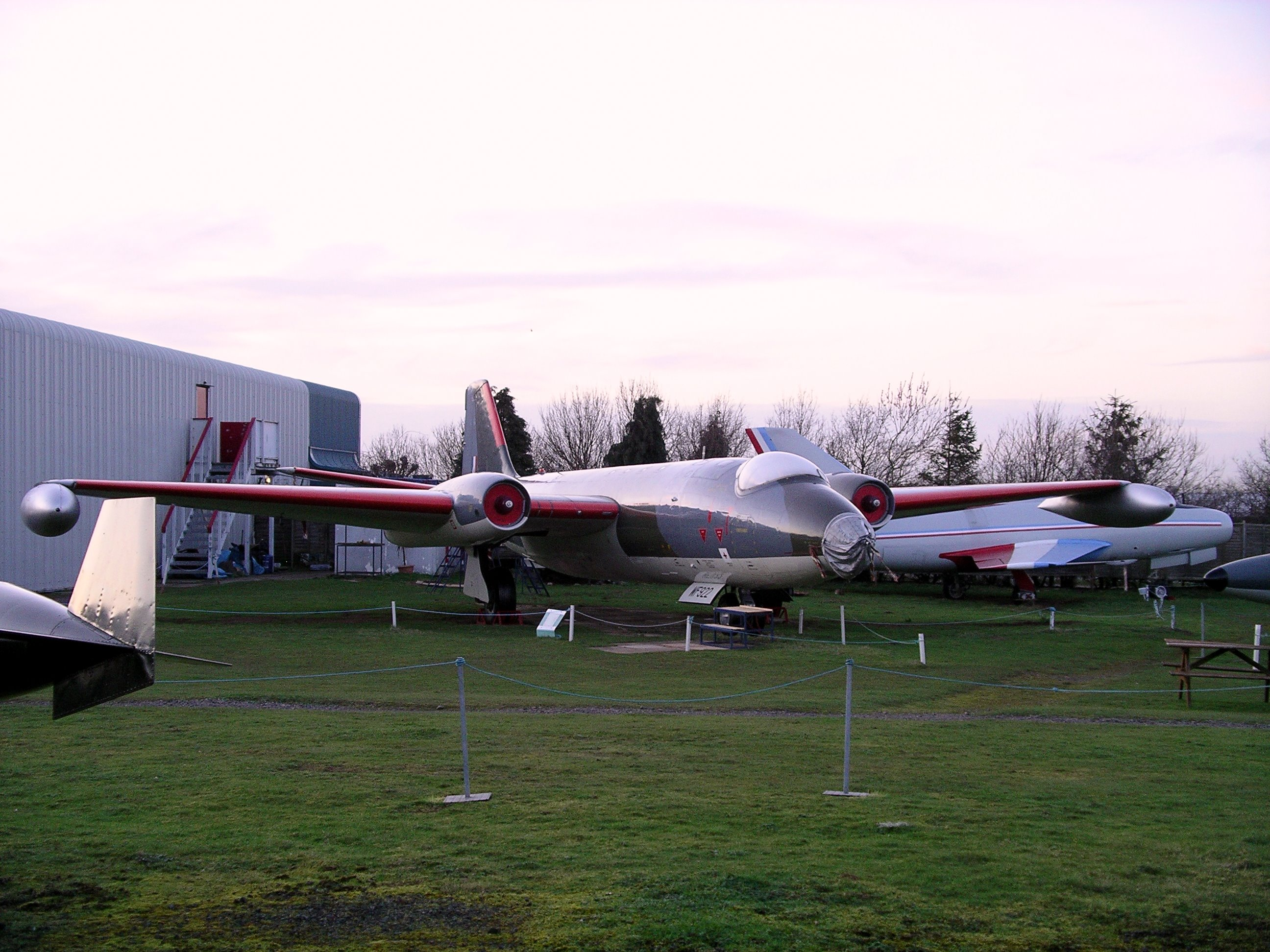
English Electric Canberra PR3 (ex. serial number WF992)

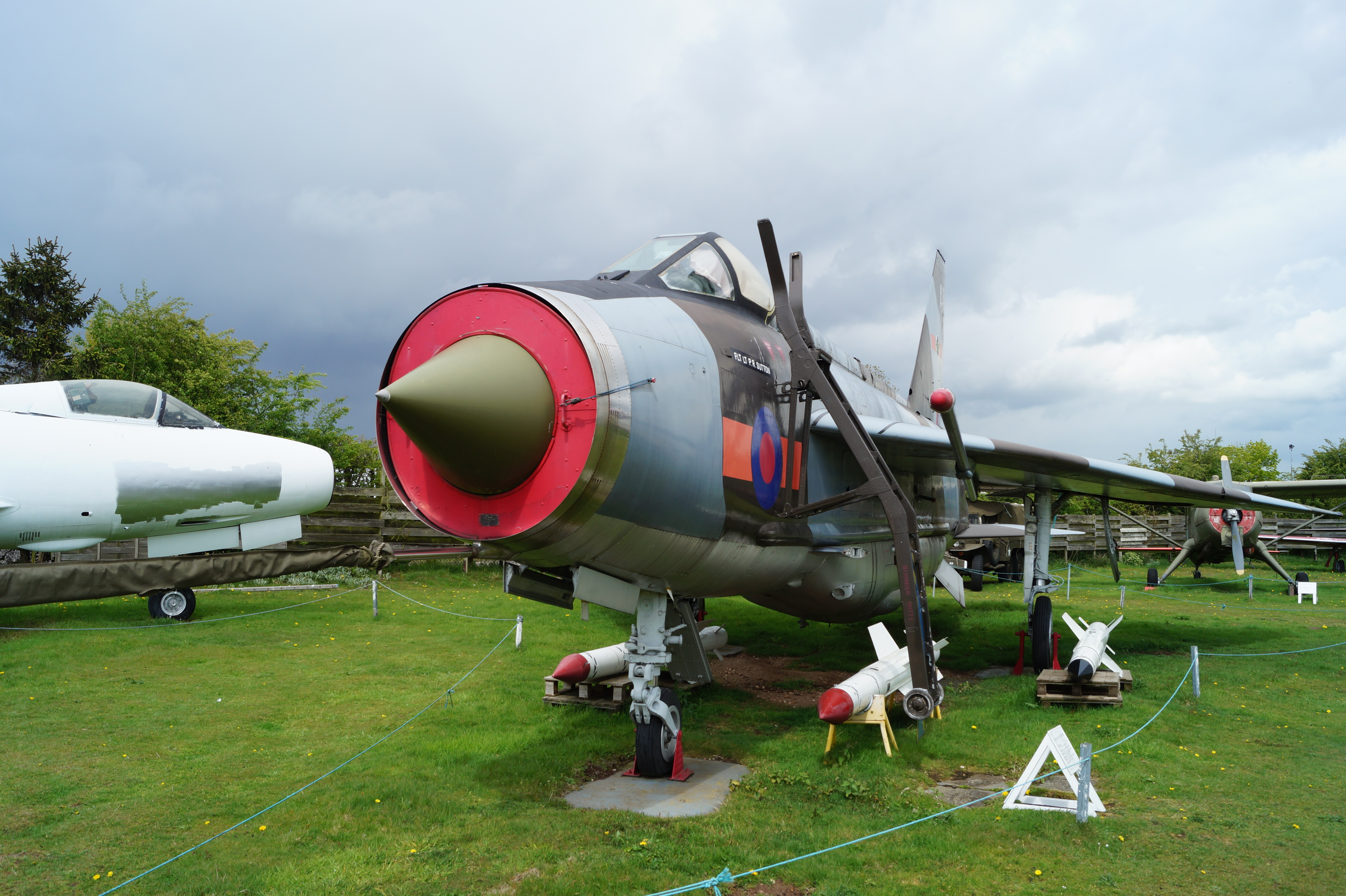
BAC Lightning F.6 ex. serial number XR771

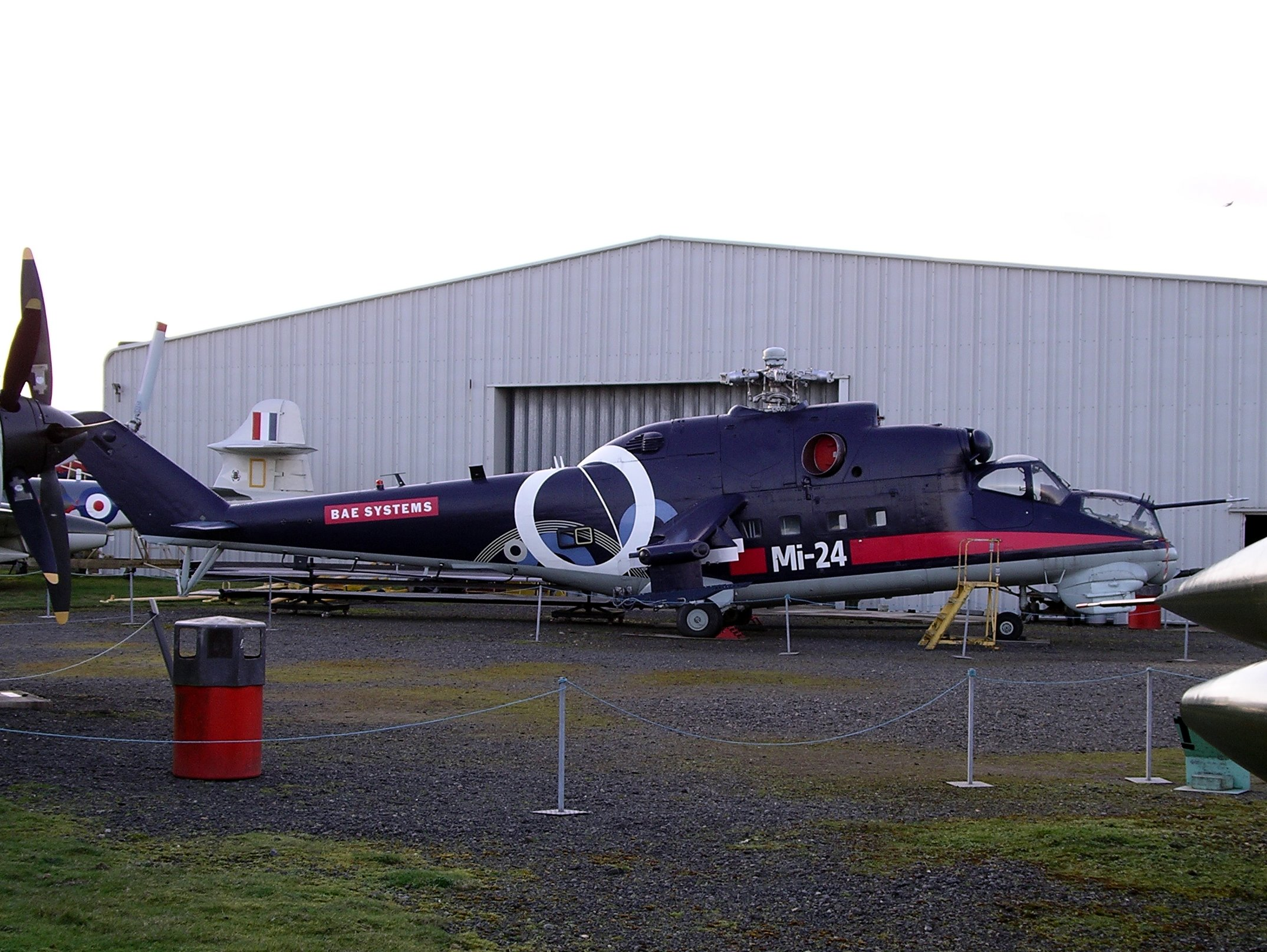
Mil Mi-24

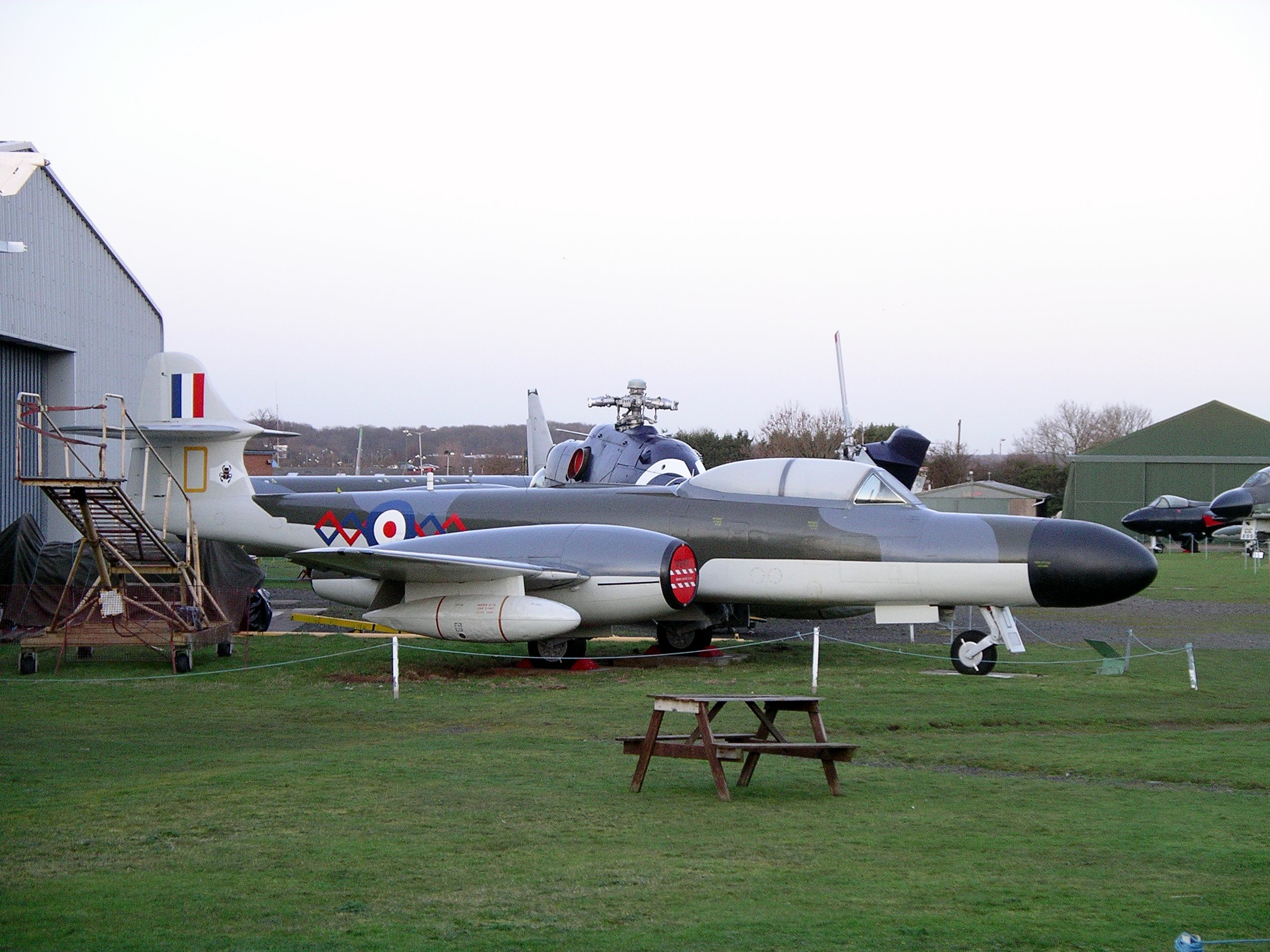
Gloster Meteor NF.14 (ex. serial number WS838, on loan from the RAF Museum)

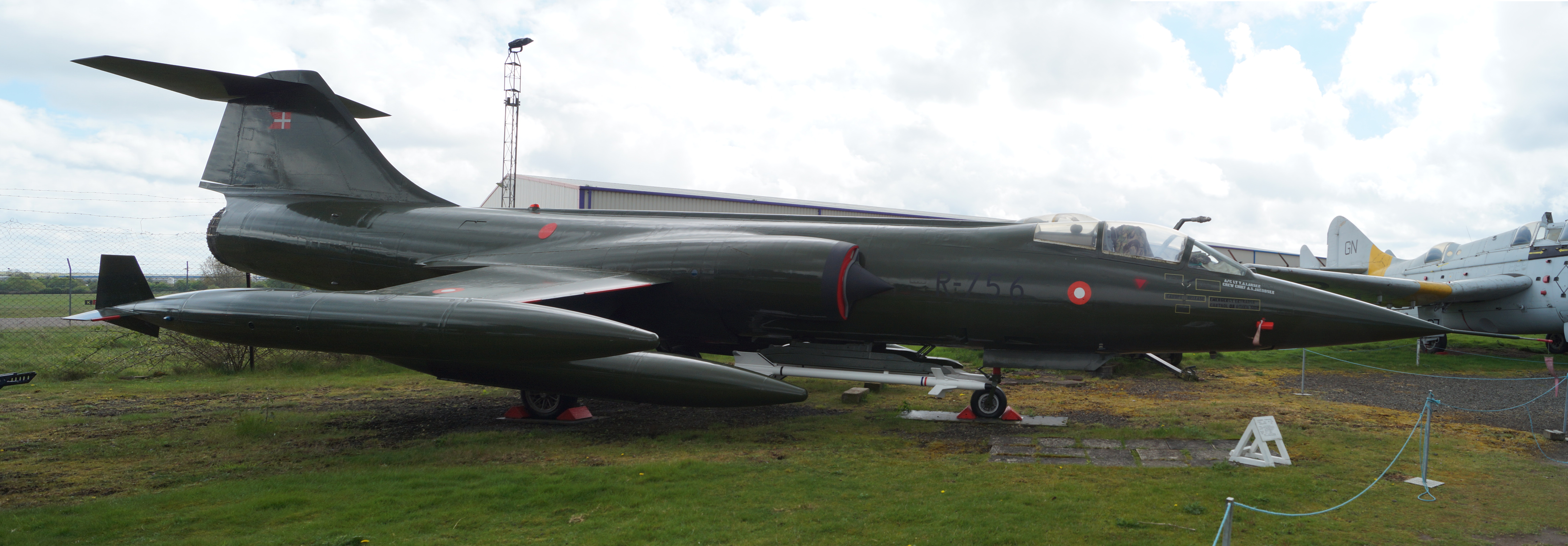
Lockheed F-104G Starfighter (ex. serial number R-756)

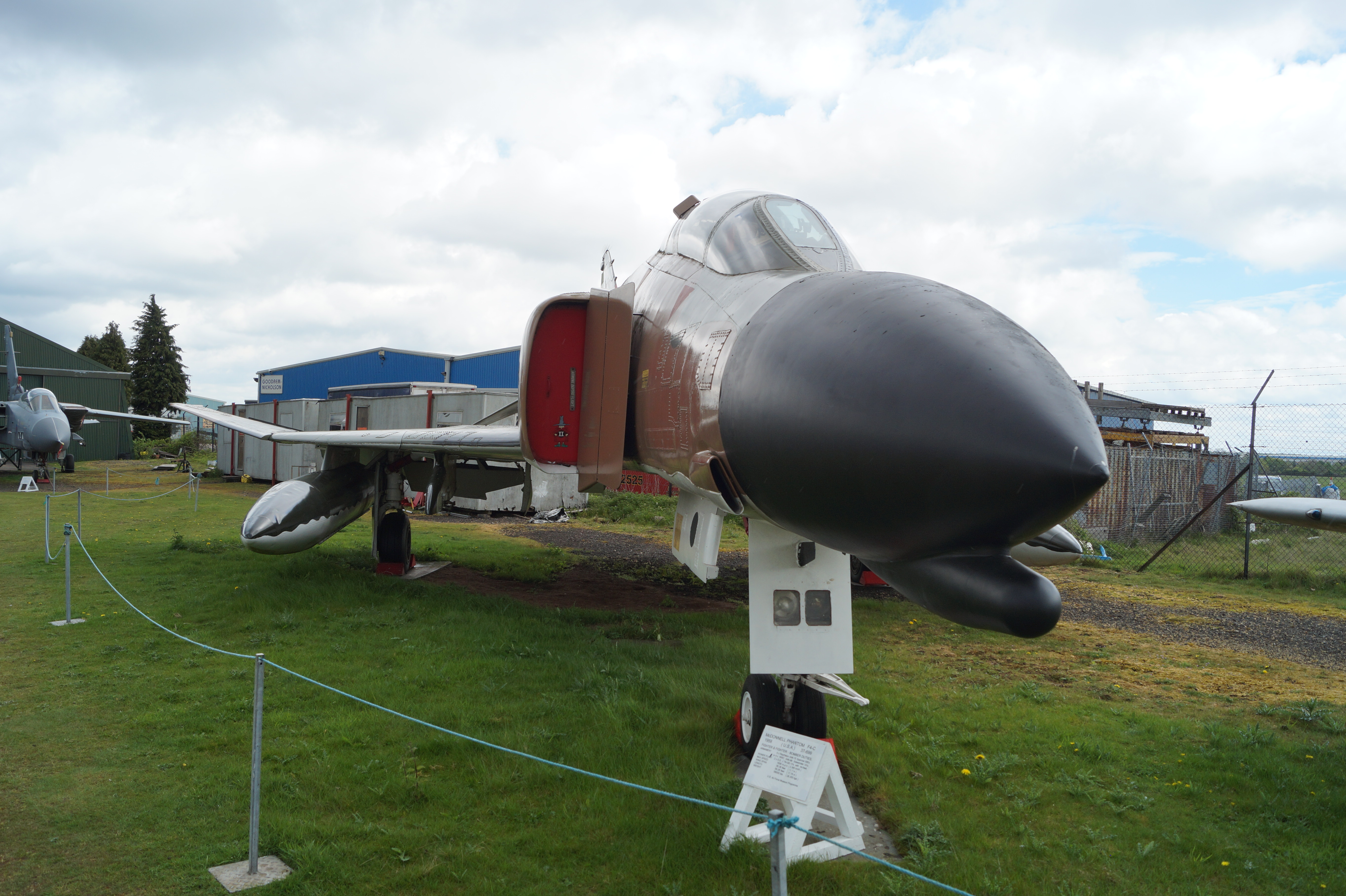
McDonnell F-4C Phantom II (ex. serial number 63-7699, on loan from USAF Museum) On May 14, 1967, this aircraft downed a [[Mikoyan-Gurevich MiG-17|MiG-17]] with an [[AIM-7 Sparrow|AIM-7E Sparrow]] missile while being flown by [[United States Air Force]] pilots Samuel O. Bakke and Robert W. Lambert.<ref>{{cite web |title=U.S. Air Force Aerial Victory Credits |url=https://www.afhra.af.mil/ |publisher=Air Force Historical Research Agency}}</ref>

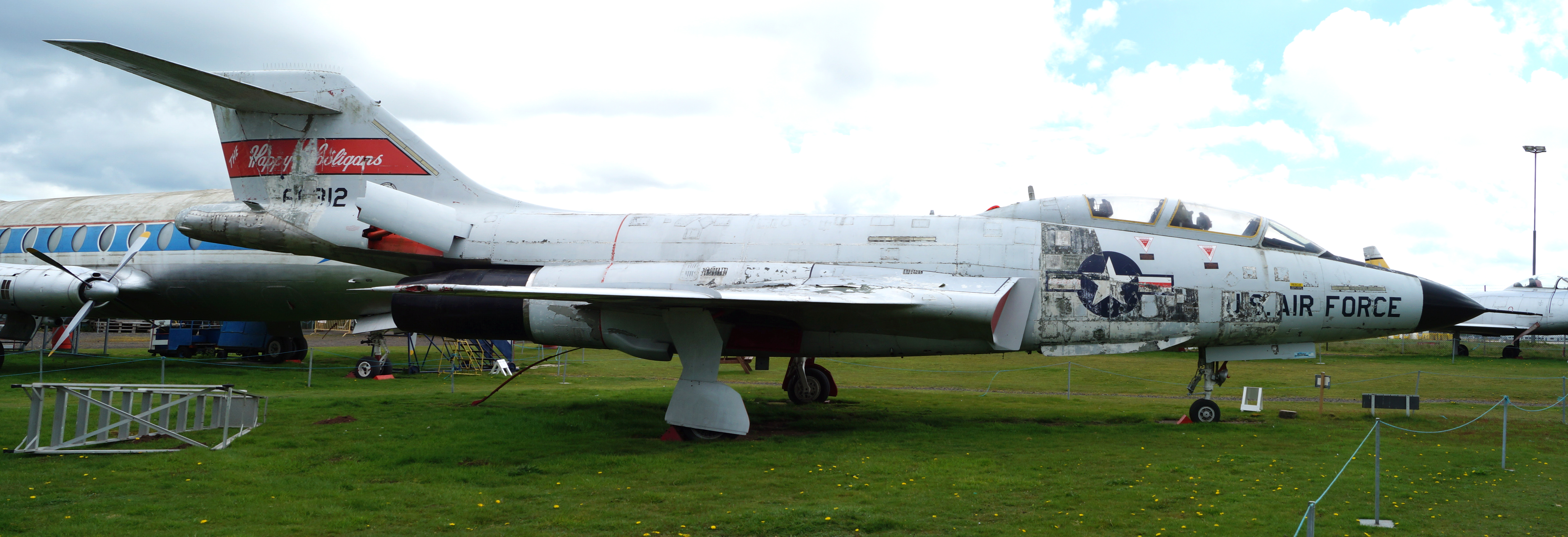
McDonnell F-101B Voodoo ex. serial number 56-0312

The museum's two largest aircraft are an Avro Vulcan B.2 and an Armstrong Whitworth Argosy AW.650 (series 101). The restored Avro Vulcan is a delta-winged aircraft that was originally part of the V bomber force and could be equipped with nuclear missiles as part of Britain's role in NATO's nuclear deterrent force during the Cold War. It is on display near the museum's car park, together with an Avro Blue Steel missile, an early design format of such a nuclear missile, and a Boulton Paul BP.111A, an experimental delta-winged aircraft of the 1950s.

The museum also has an English Electric Canberra PR.3, two English Electric Lightnings (the RAF's fastest ever interceptor), two Gloster Meteors (one on loan from the Royal Air Force Museum Midlands), an Armstrong Whitworth Sea Hawk FGA.6, a Mil Mi-24 helicopter, and many others.

=== List of aircraft on display ===
Aircraft	Civil registration/ Military Serial/ British Aircraft Preservation Council (BAPC) Number	Notes
Armstrong Whitworth Argosy AW.650 (series 101)	G-APRL	Often open for viewing
Armstrong Whitworth Meteor NF.14	WS838	On loan from the Royal Air Force Museum Midlands
Armstrong Whitworth Sea Hawk FGA.6	WV797	Royal Navy
Armstrong Whitworth Whitley	N1498	Remains; fuselage section etc. - the only substantial Whitley remains in existence
Auster T.7 Antarctic	WE600	Fuselage - 1956 Commonwealth Trans-Antarctic Expedition
Avro Vulcan B.2	XL360	Royal Air Force
Beagle B.206	G-ASWJ	
Boulton Paul P.111A	VT935	
Bristol Beaufighter	Possibly T5298	Cockpit section
British Aerospace Sea Harrier FA.2	ZE694	On loan from BAE Systems
CMC Leopard	G-BRNM	
Crossley Tom Thumb	BAPC.32	Stored
Dassault Mystere IVA	70	French Air Force, on loan from the USAF Museum
de Havilland Dove 2	G-ALCU	Painted as G-ALVD
de Havilland Sea Vixen FAW.2	XJ579	Nose section
de Havilland Sea Vixen FAW.2	XN685	
de Havilland Vampire F.1	VF301	Only F.1 Vampire in the UK
de Havilland Vampire T.11	XD626	Stored
de Havilland Vampire T.11	XE855	Fuselage pod on display in Robin Hangar
de Havilland Canada U-6A Beaver	58-1062	
Druine D.31 Turbulent	BAPC.126	
English Electric Canberra PR.3	WF922	
English Electric Canberra T.17A	WH646	Nose section
BAC Lightning F.6	XR771	
English Electric Lightning T.55	55-713	
Fairey Gannet T.2	XA508	On loan from Fleet Air Arm Museum; only remaining T.2 Gannet in existence
Fairey Ultra Light	G-APJJ	
Flettner Fl 282V-10	28368	Partial aircraft; frame with rotor head and wheels, under restoration.
Folland Gnat F.1	XK741	Fuselage only, replica wings currently in store.
Gloster Javelin FAW.5	XA699	Royal Air Force
Gloster Meteor F.4	EE531	Second oldest Meteor in existence
Gloster Meteor F.8	VZ477	Nose section
Hawker Hunter F.6A	XF382	Royal Air Force, on loan from the USAF Museum
Hawker Siddeley 125 series 1	G-ARYB	Fuselage and partial port wing; 2nd prototype, working hydraulics.
Humber Monoplane	BAPC.9	Replica
Kaman HH-43B Huskie	62-4535	United States Air Force, undergoing restoration, one of only two in the UK
Lockheed T-33A	51-4419	Former French Air Force painted to represent a T-33 of the United States Air Force, on loan from the USAF Museum
Lockheed T-33A	Unmarked	Former French Air Force 17473 painted in Italian Air Force colours, on loan from the USAF Museum
Lockheed F-104G Starfighter	R-756	Danish Air Force, on loan from the USAF Museum
McDonnell F-101B Voodoo	56-0312	United States Air Force, on loan from the USAF Museum
McDonnell F-101B Voodoo	57-0270	On loan from the USAF Museum; nose, in store, (not viewable)
McDonnell F-4C Phantom II	63-7414	On loan from USAF Museum; dismantled.
McDonnell F-4C Phantom II	63-7699	On loan from USAF Museum
Mignet HM.14 "Flying Flea"	G-AEGV	
Mil Mi-24	Red 06	
Mikoyan-Gurevich MiG-21SPS	959	East German Air Force
North American F-86A Sabre	48-0242	United States Air Force
North American F-100D Super Sabre	54-1174	Former French Air Force aircraft painted to represent a United States Air Force F-100, on loan from the USAF Museum
Parnall Pixie IIIa	G-EBJG	Stored
Panavia Tornado GR.4	ZA452	Royal Air Force
Percival Prentice T.1	VS623	Royal Air Force
PZL TS-11 Iskra	1H0408	Marked as 1706 of the Polish Air Force
SAAB J29F Tunnan	29640	Swedish Air Force, only example in the UK
Slingsby Cadet TX.1	BGA.804	Stored
Vickers Viscount 708	F-BGNR	Air Inter markings
Westland Whirlwind Series 3	G-APWN	Bristow markings
Westland Whirlwind HAS.7	XK907	Storage area - remains of nose section
Wheeler Slymph	G-ABOI	Stored

==== Former residents on the British Aircraft Preservation Council register ====
- BAPC. 25 - Nyborg TGN-111 glider.
- BAPC. 26 - Auster AOP.9. (Note: Sold to the South Wales Aircraft Preservation Society between 1979 and 1981.)
- BAPC. 67 - Bf 109 (replica) (Note: Formerly owned by J. P. Berkeley.)
- BAPC. 68 - Hurricane (replica) (Note: Formerly owned by J. P. Berkeley.)
- BAPC. 69 - Spitfire (replica) (Note: Formerly owned by J. P. Berkeley. Moved to the Torbay Aircraft Museum between 1981 and 84.)
- BAPC. 72 - Hurricane (replica) (Note: Formerly owned by J. P. Berkeley. Moved to the North Weald Aircraft Restoration Flight between 1981 and 84.)
- BAPC. 125 - Clay Cherub

== Engines on display ==
The Midland Air Museum has a number of aero engines on display with a dedicated section on the work of Frank Whittle.

=== Piston engines ===
- Alvis Leonides
- Bentley BR1
- Rolls-Royce Griffon

=== Gas turbine engines ===
- Armstrong Siddeley Mamba
- Armstrong Siddeley Double Mamba
- Armstrong Siddeley Sapphire
- Armstrong Siddeley Viper
- de Havilland Ghost (Svenska Flygmotor RM2)
- Bristol Siddeley Orpheus
- Rolls-Royce Avon
- Rolls-Royce Derwent
- Rolls-Royce Gem
- Rolls-Royce Spey
- Rover W2B/26

=== Rocket engines ===
- Bristol Siddeley BS.605
- Armstrong Siddeley Stentor

== See also ==
- List of aerospace museums
