= Bluebird-Proteus CN7 =

Gas-turbine powered vehicle used to set a world land speed record

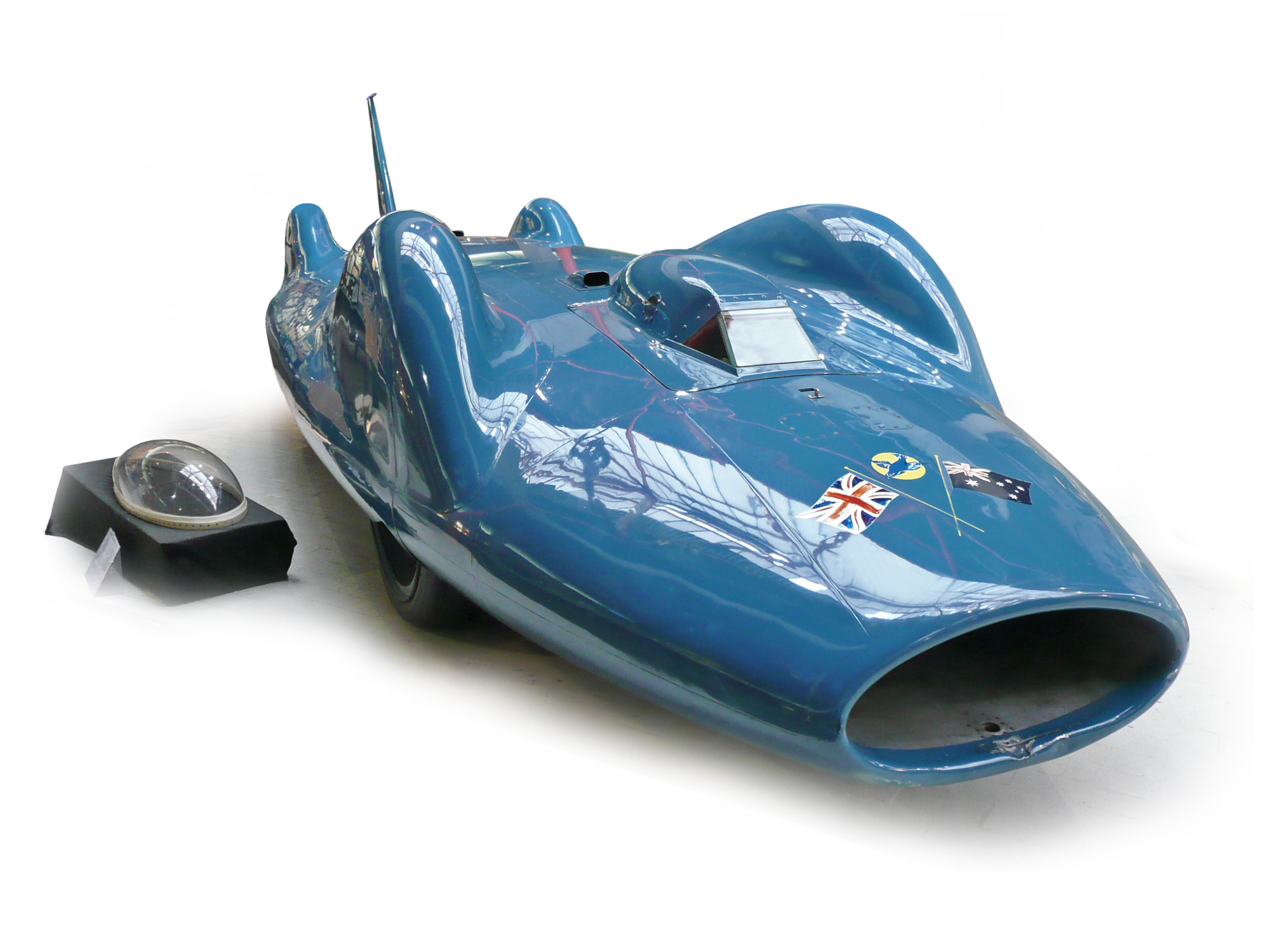
- Bluebird in the National Motor Museum, Beaulieu

Overview
- Manufacturer: Motor Panels
- Also called: Proteus-Bluebird Campbell–Norris 7
- Production: 1
- Designer: Ken Norris

Body and chassis
- Body style: streamlined fully enclosed "turtle shell"
- Layout: four-wheel drive centre engined

Powertrain
- Engine: A Bristol-Siddeley Proteus 705 free-turbine turboshaft) engine of 4,450 shp (3,320 kW)
- Transmission: Front and rear drives to separate 3.6 to 1 spiral bevel gearboxes

Dimensions
- Wheelbase: 13 ft 6 in (4.11 m)
- Length: 30 ft (9.1 m)
- Width: 5 ft 6 in (1.68 m) Track front and rear
- Height: 4 ft 9 in (1.45 m) without the vertical fin, 7 ft 8 in (2.34 m) with fin
- Kerb weight: 8,064 lb (3,658 kg) – 8,960 lb (4,060 kg)

The Bluebird-Proteus CN7 is a gas turbine-powered vehicle that was driven by Donald Campbell and achieved the world land speed record on Lake Eyre in Australia on 17 July 1964. The vehicle set the FIA world record for the flying mile at 403.1 mph (648.7 km/h).

== Design and construction ==
In 1956, Campbell began planning a car to break the land speed record, which then stood at 394 mph (634 km/h) set by John Cobb in the Railton Mobil Special. The Norris brothers, who had designed Campbell's highly successful Bluebird K7 hydroplane, designed Bluebird-Proteus CN7 with 500 mph (800 km/h) in mind.

The CN7 (Campbell–Norris 7) was constructed by Motor Panels in Coventry, supervised by Donald Stevens of Norris Bros & Maurice Britton of Motor Panels with Ken and Lew Norris as co-chief designers and was completed by the spring of 1960.

Bluebird CN7 was the first land speed record vehicle to be powered by a gas turbine engine. The Bristol-Siddeley Proteus was the Bristol Aeroplane Company's first successful gas turbine engine design, and delivered 4,450 shp (3,300 kW) with no thrust allowed by the FIA, exhaust was limited to fill in aerodynamic disturbance at the rear. The Proteus was a two spool, reverse flow free-turbine turboshaft. Because the turbine stages of the inner spool drove no compressor stages, but only a power shaft. The engine, a Proteus 705, was specially modified by Norris Bros to have a power shaft at each end of the engine. These shafts are connected directly to final drive assemblies with differentials and fixed ratios of 3.6:1 providing power to all four wheels via half-shafts.

The car weighs 4 tons and was built with an advanced aluminum honeycomb sandwich of immense strength, with a fully independent double wishbone suspension. The split-rim design wheels and 52-inch (130 cm) diameter tyres were manufactured by Dunlop. The tyre inflation specification was set by Dunlop at greater than 100 psi (690 kPa). When the car ran at Goodwood they were inflated to 130 psi (900 kPa) and for record attempts to 160 psi (1,100 kPa). Bluebird has a frontal area of 26 square feet (2.4 m^{2}) and a drag coefficient of 0.16, giving it a Drag area of 4.16 square feet (0.39 m^{2}).

Brakes were Girling disc brakes, inboard mounted (to reduce unsprung mass) at all four wheels. The brakes are hydraulically controlled with a back up pneumatic system operated from compressed air reservoirs. The brake discs measured 16 3/8 inches (420 mm) in diameter and are capable of operating up to a maximum temperature of 1,200 °C (2,200 °F). Additional braking was provided by hydraulically powered air brakes that extended out from the rear of the vehicle. The turbine engine also provided approximately 500 hp (370 kW) of engine braking when the throttle was closed at 400 mph (640 km/h), diminishing as speed decreased.

== Goodwood, 1960 ==
Campbell demonstrated his Bluebird CN7 Land Speed Record car at Goodwood Circuit in July 1960, at its initial public launch and again in July 1962. The laps of Goodwood were effectively at 'tick-over' speed, because the car had only 4 degrees of steering lock, with a maximum of 100 mph on the straight on one lap. Its shakedown was actually at RAF Tangmere on the main runway in 1962. The press release photos were taken at Goodwood

== Bonneville, 1960 ==
Following the low-speed tests conducted at Goodwood, the CN7 was taken to the Bonneville Salt Flats in Utah, USA, scene of Campbell's father's last land speed record (LSR) triumph in 1935. In early September, CN7 accelerated from a standing start to just under 400 mph or 640 km/h in 24 seconds covering 1.5 miles, using approximately 80 per cent of the engine's full power. The LSR attempt however, which was heavily sponsored by BP, Dunlop, and other British motor component companies, was unsuccessful and CN7 was severely damaged during a high-speed crash on 16 September. Campbell suffered a fracture to his lower skull, a broken ear drum, and cuts and bruises. He convalesced in California until November 1960. Meanwhile, plans had been put in motion to rebuild CN7 for a further attempt.

His confidence was severely shaken, he was suffering mild panic attacks, and for some time he doubted whether he would ever return to record breaking. As part of his recuperation he learned to fly light aircraft and this boost to his confidence was an important factor in his recovery. By 1961 he was on the road to recovery and planning the rebuild of CN7.

== Lake Eyre, 1963 ==
The rebuilt car was completed, with modifications including differential locks and a large vertical stabilising fin, in 1962. After initial trials at Goodwood and further modifications to the very strong fibreglass cockpit canopy, CN7 was shipped this time to Australia for a new attempt at Lake Eyre in 1963. The Lake Eyre location was chosen as it offered 450 square miles (1,170 km^{2}) of dried salt lake, where rain had not fallen in the previous 20 years, and the surface of the 20 miles (32 km) long track was as hard as concrete. As Campbell arrived in late March, with a view to a May attempt, the first light rain fell. Campbell and Bluebird were running by early May but once again more rain fell, and low-speed test runs could not progress into the higher speed ranges. By late May, the rain became torrential, and the lake was flooded. Campbell had to move the CN7 off the lake in the middle of the night to save the car from being submerged by the rising flood waters. The 1963 attempt was over. Campbell received very bad press following the failure to set a new record, but the weather conditions had made an attempt out of the question. BP pulled out as a sponsor at the end of the year.

== Lake Eyre, 1964 ==
Campbell and his team returned to Lake Eyre in 1964, with sponsorship from Australian oil company Ampol, but the salt surface never returned to the promise it had held in 1962 and Campbell had to battle with CN7 to reach record speeds (over 400 mph or 640 km/h). After more light rain in June, the lake finally began to dry enough for an attempt to be made. On 17 July 1964, Campbell set a record of 403.10 mph (648.73 km/h) for a four-wheeled vehicle (Class A). Campbell was disappointed with the record speed as the vehicle had been designed for 500 mph (800 km/h). CN7 covered the final third of the measured mile at an average of 429 mph (690 km/h), peaking as it left the measured mile at over 440 mph (710 km/h). Had the salt surface been hard and dry, and the full 15-mile length originally envisaged, there can be no doubt that CN7 would have set a record well in excess of 450 mph (720 km/h) and perhaps close to her design maximum of 500 mph (800 km/h), a speed that no other wheel-driven car has approached. Campbell commissioned the author John Pearson to chronicle this attempt, with the resultant book Bluebird and the Dead Lake, first published by Collins in 1965.

== After the record ==
To celebrate the record, Campbell drove CN7 through the streets of the South Australian capital, Adelaide, to a presentation at city hall before a crowd of in excess of 200,000 people. CN7 was then displayed widely in Australia and the UK after her return in November 1964.

In June 1966, CN7 was demonstrated at RAF Debden in Essex, with a stand in driver, Peter Bolton. He crashed the car during a medium speed run, causing damage to her bodywork and front suspension. The car was patched up and Campbell ran her at a much lower speed than he intended. Campbell continued with his plans for the rocket-powered car Bluebird Mach 1.1 with a view to raising the LSR towards Mach 1. In January 1967, he was killed in his water-speed record jet hydroplane Bluebird K7.

CN7 was eventually restored in 1969, but has never fully run again. In 1969, Campbell's widow, Tonia Bern-Campbell negotiated a deal with Lynn Garrison, President of Craig Breedlove and Associates, that would see Craig Breedlove run Bluebird on Bonneville's Salt Flats. This concept was cancelled when the parallel Spirit of America supersonic car project failed to find support.

It became a permanent exhibit at the National Motor Museum, Beaulieu, England in 1972, and as of January 2022, is still on display there.

Formula One car designer Adrian Newey has commented that Bluebird CN7 was the first car to properly recognise and make use of ground effect.

== See also ==
- Campbell-Railton Blue Bird
