= Bristol Siddeley Gamma =

1950s British rocket engine

Gamma 201
- Country of origin: Britain
- Manufacturer: Bristol Siddeley
- Application: 1st stage booster
- Predecessor: Armstrong Siddeley Stentor
- Successor: Gamma 301

Liquid-fuel engine
- Propellant: Hydrogen peroxide / kerosene
- Mixture ratio: 8:1 (approx.)
- Cycle: Gas-generator

Configuration
- Chamber: 4, gimballed in opposed pairs

Performance
- Thrust, sea-level: 16,400 lbf (73 kN)

Gamma 301
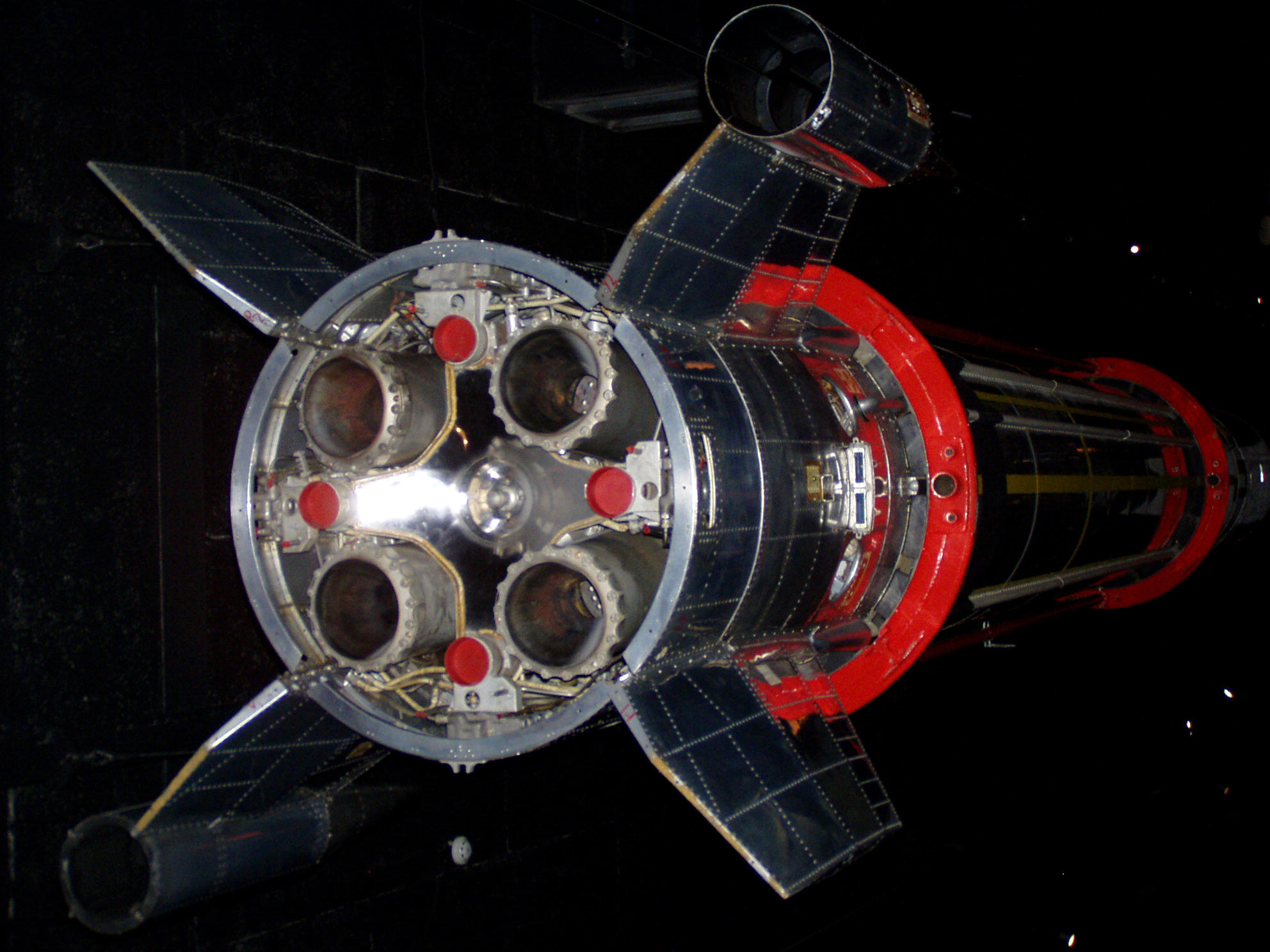
- Black Knight tail showing engines
- Application: 1st stage booster
- Predecessor: Gamma 201
- Successor: Gamma 8

Liquid-fuel engine
- Propellant: Hydrogen peroxide / kerosene
- Mixture ratio: 8:1 (approx.)
- Cycle: Gas-generator

Configuration
- Chamber: 4, gimballed in opposed pairs

Performance
- Thrust, sea-level: 17,000–21,600 lbf (76–96 kN)-21,000 lbf (93 kN)
- Specific impulse: 250 seconds (2.5 km/s)
- Burn time: 120 seconds

Gamma 2
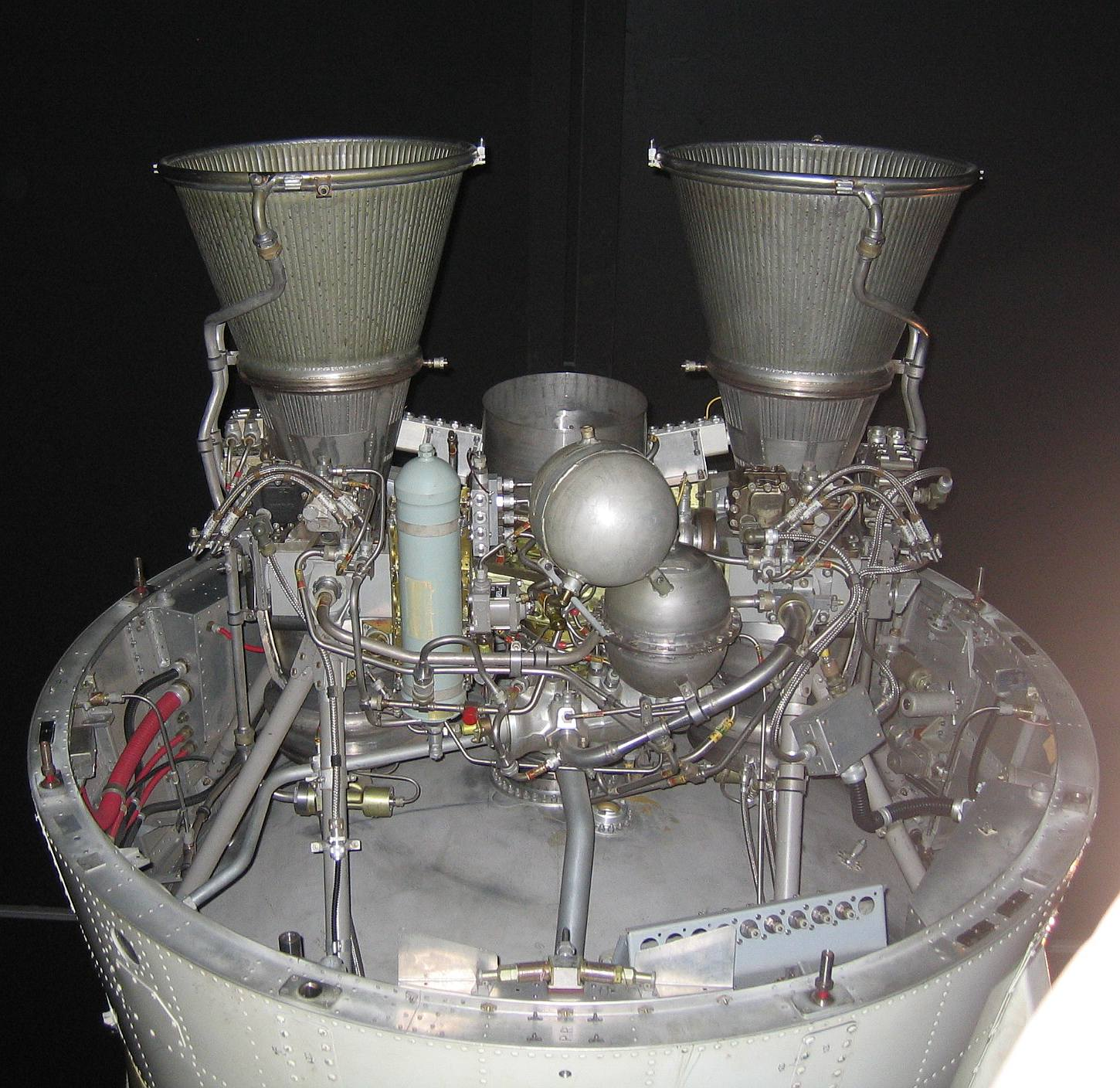
- Gamma 2 rocket engine, used for the second stage
- Application: 2nd stage
- Predecessor: Gamma 301
- Successor: Larch (rocket engine)

Liquid-fuel engine
- Propellant: Hydrogen peroxide / kerosene
- Cycle: Gas-generator

Configuration
- Chamber: 2, extended

Performance
- Thrust, vacuum: 68.2 kN (15,300 lbf)
- Thrust, sea-level: 64.60 kN (14,520 lbf)
- Burn time: 113 seconds

Gamma 8
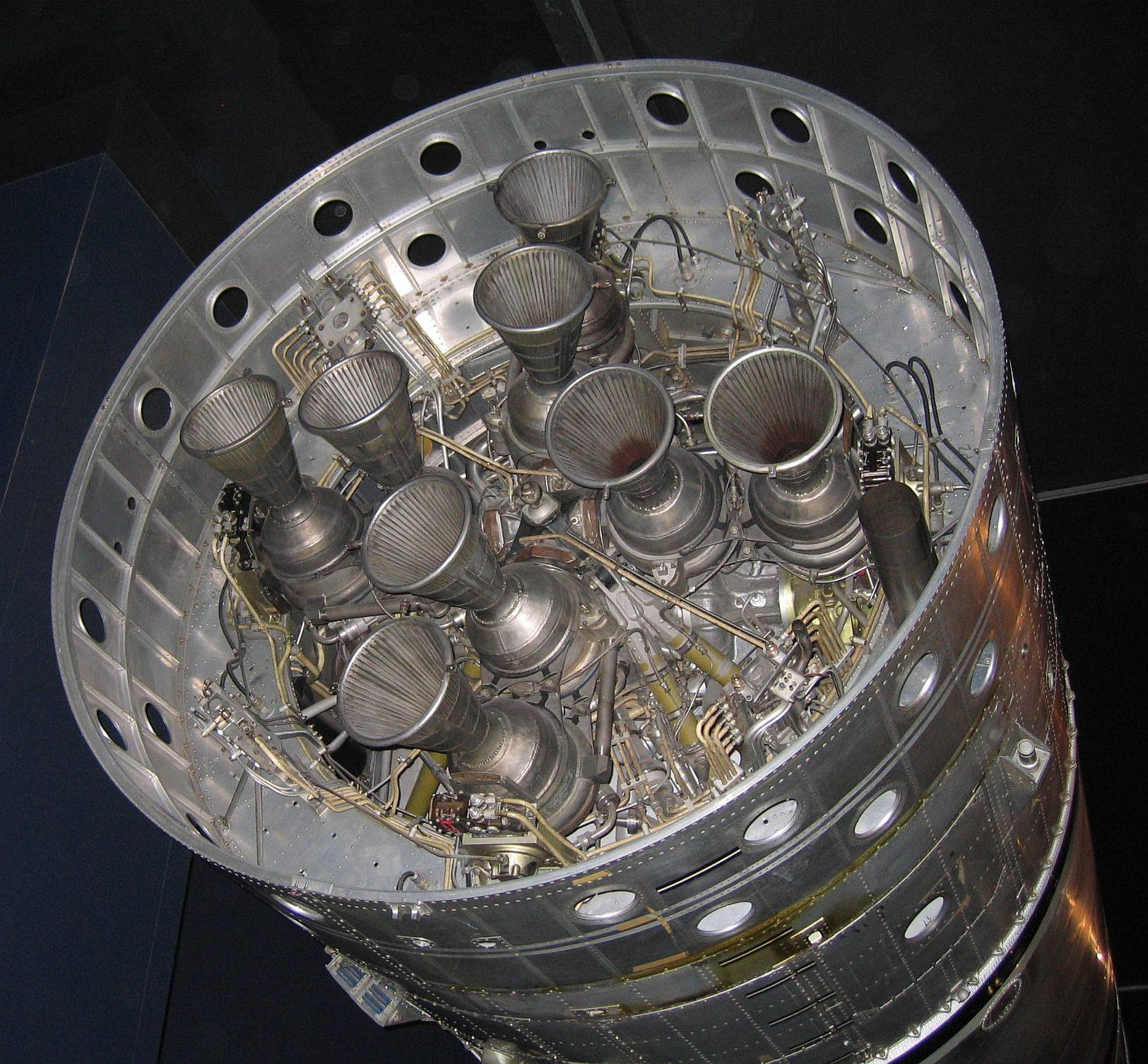
- Gamma 8 rocket engine on Black Arrow 1st stage
- Application: 1st stage booster
- Predecessor: Gamma 301

Liquid-fuel engine
- Propellant: Hydrogen peroxide / kerosene
- Cycle: Gas-generator

Configuration
- Chamber: 8, gimballed in pairs

Performance
- Thrust, sea-level: 52,785 lbf (234.80 kN)
- Burn time: 125 seconds

The Armstrong Siddeley, later Bristol Siddeley Gamma was a family of rocket engines used in British rocketry, including the Black Knight and Black Arrow launch vehicles. They burned kerosene fuel and hydrogen peroxide. Their construction was based on a common combustion chamber design, used either singly or in clusters of up to eight.

They were developed by Armstrong Siddeley in Coventry, which later became Bristol Siddeley in 1959, and finally Rolls-Royce in 1966.

Engine static testing was carried out at High Down Rocket Test Site, near The Needles on the Isle of Wight (50°39′38.90″N 1°34′38.25″W). (Spadeadam in Cumbria wasn't used for testing until Blue Streak, after Gamma).

== Advantages of kerosene / peroxide engines ==
Use of kerosene / hydrogen peroxide engines has been a particularly British trait in rocket development, there being few comparable engines (such as the LR-40 and AR2) from the US.

The combustion of kerosene with hydrogen peroxide is given by the formula

CH_{2} + 3H_{2}O_{2} → CO_{2} + 4H_{2}O

where CH_{2} is the approximate formula of kerosene (see RP-1 for a discussion of kerosene rocket fuels). This compares with the combustion of kerosene and liquid oxygen (LOX)

CH_{2} + 1.5O_{2} → CO_{2} + H_{2}O

showing that the exhaust from kerosene / peroxide is predominantly water. This results in a very clean exhaust (second only to cryogenic LO_{2}/LH_{2}) and a distinctive clear flame. The low molecular mass of water also helps to increase rocket thrust performance.

The oxidiser used with Gamma was 85% high-test peroxide (HTP), H_{2}O_{2}. Gamma used a silver-plated on nickel-gauze catalyst to first decompose the peroxide. For higher concentrations of H_{2}O_{2} another catalyst would have been required, such as platinum. No ignition source was required since the very hot decomposed H_{2}O_{2} is hypergolic (will spontaneously combust) with kerosene. Due to the high ratio (8:1) of the mass of H_{2}O_{2} used compared to the kerosene, and also its superior heat characteristics, the H_{2}O_{2} may also be used to regeneratively cool the engine nozzle before combustion. In closed cycle engines the pre-combustion chamber used to power any pump turbines needs only to decompose H_{2}O_{2} to provide energy. This gives the efficiency advantages of closed cycle operation, without its usual major engineering problems. The Gamma, being a gas generator cycle engine however did not take advantage of this.

All of these characteristics lead to kerosene / hydrogen peroxide engines being simpler and more reliable to construct than other liquid propellant chemistries. Gamma had a remarkably reliable service record for a rocket engine. Of the 22 Black Knight and 4 Black Arrow launchers, involving 128 Gamma engines, there were no engine failures.

== Stentor ==
The Gamma was adapted as the smaller cruise chamber of the two-chamber Stentor rocket engine produced by Armstrong Siddeley for the Blue Steel stand-off missile.

== Gamma 201 ==
Bristol-Siddeley developed this stand-alone four-chamber engine from 1955 to 1957 for the Black Knight test vehicles. Gamma 201 was used for the first twelve Black Knight launches (14 in total), Gamma 301 for most of the later flights.

The initial Black Knight vehicles were single-stage rockets designed to test prototype re-entry heads for the proposed Blue Streak strategic ballistic missile. Testing of the Black Knight began at Woomera, Australia in 1958, but the Blue Streak project was cancelled in 1960. The rockets continued to be tested until 1965, as part of a planned two-stage space launcher, using the Gamma 201 for the first stage until August 1962, when it was replaced by the more powerful Gamma 301.

== Gamma 301 ==
This was basically the same as the Gamma 201, but had automatic mixture-ratio control for improved thrust. There were nine initial test firings of the Gamma 301 engine at High Down from 16 April to 31 May 1957, all of which were largely successful. Black Knight launches BK16 and BK18 used the Gamma 301. These two were the beginning of the Project Dazzle high-speed re-entry vehicle trials, where a solid fuel Cuckoo was mounted pointing downwards in the second stage, so as to increase re-entry speeds. Eight Gamma 301 launches were made in total.

== Gamma 2 / Double Gamma ==
A two chamber version of Gamma, used for the second stage of the Black Arrow satellite launch vehicle. As the only Gamma not required to operate at sea level, the nozzles were extended to allow better expansion.

== Gamma 8 ==
This was an 8 chamber development of Gamma, used for the first stage of the Black Arrow satellite launch vehicle. Gamma thrust chambers were mounted in pairs radially, each pair on a one-axis tangential gimbal. Collective movement gave roll control, differential movement pitch.

== Gallery ==
Bristol Siddeley Gamma rocket engines

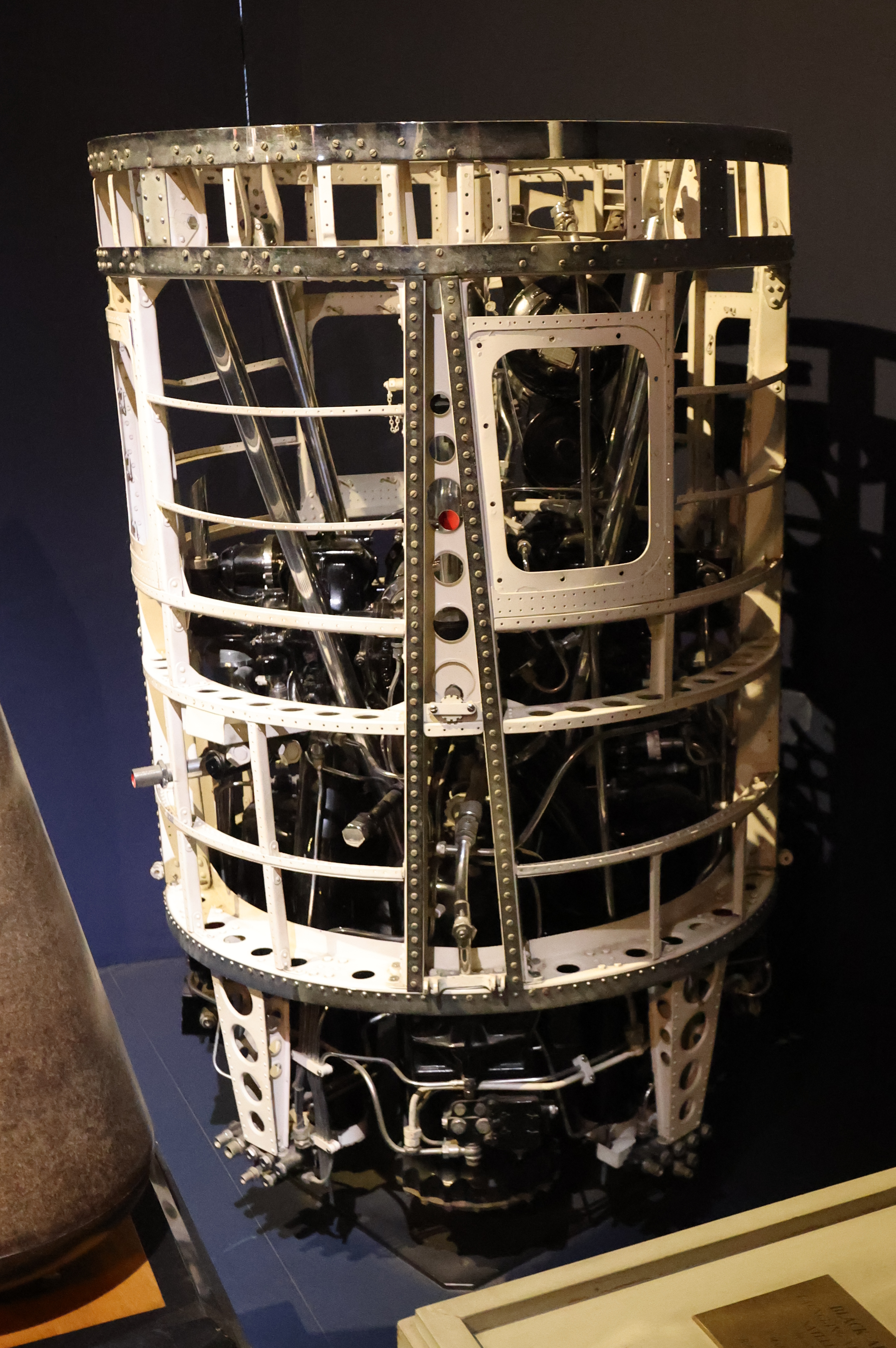
Gamma 201 engine

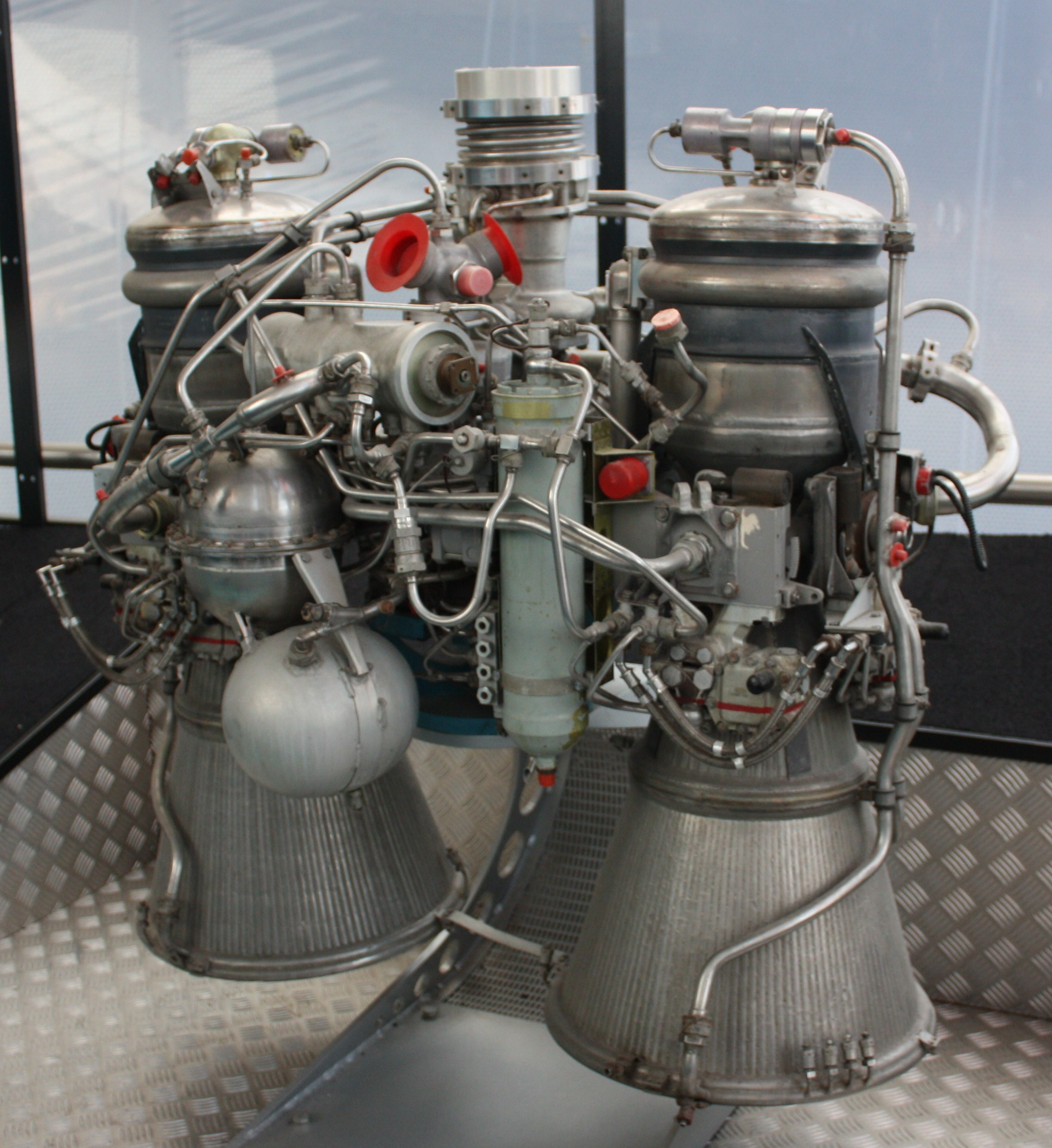
Gamma 2 rocket engine, used on the Black Arrow 2nd stage

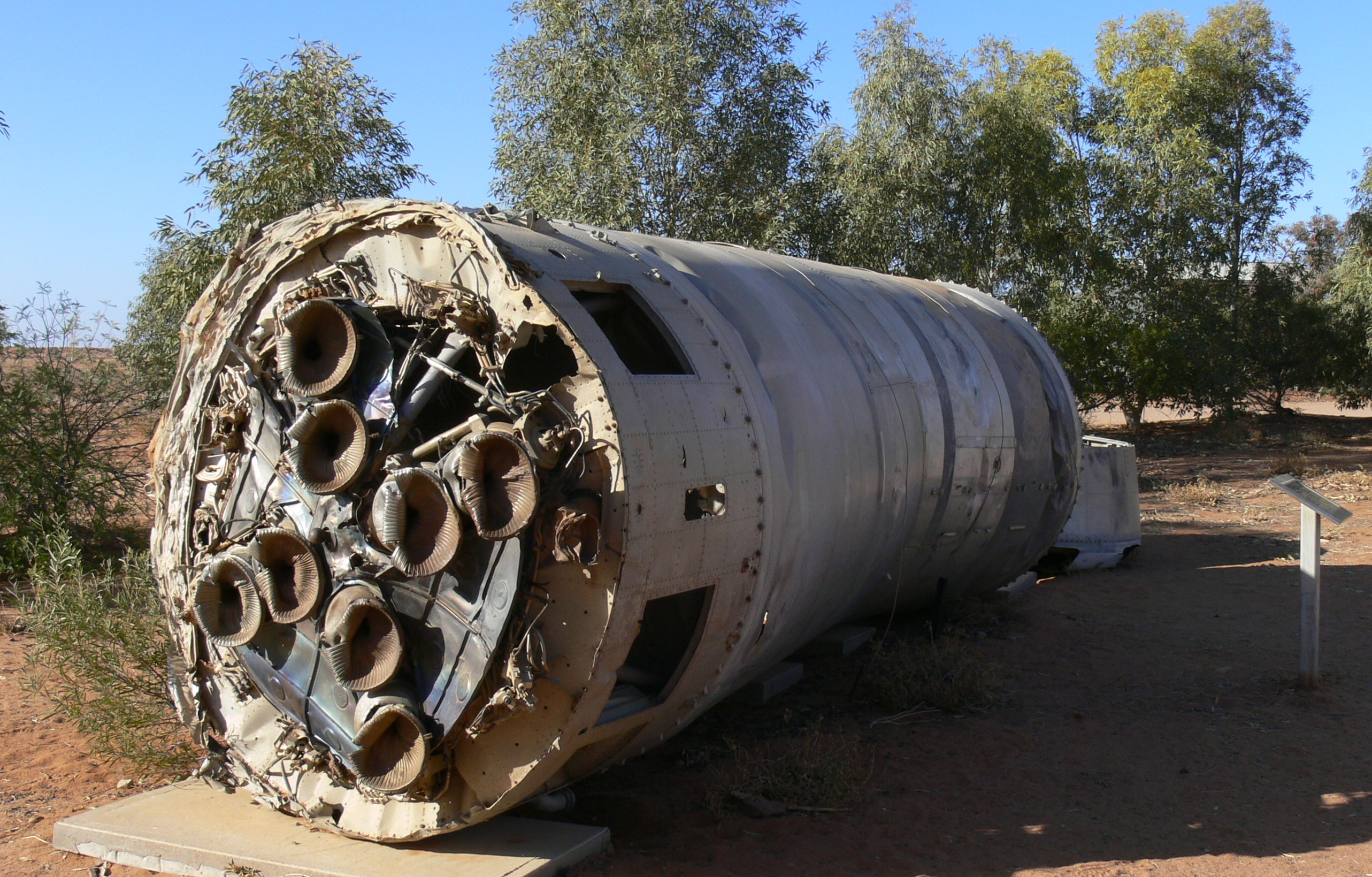
The recovered remains of Stage 1 of the Black Arrow R3 rocket, successfully launched from the Woomera Rocket Range in October 1971.
