= Rocketdyne AR2 =

1950s American aircraft rocket engine

AR2
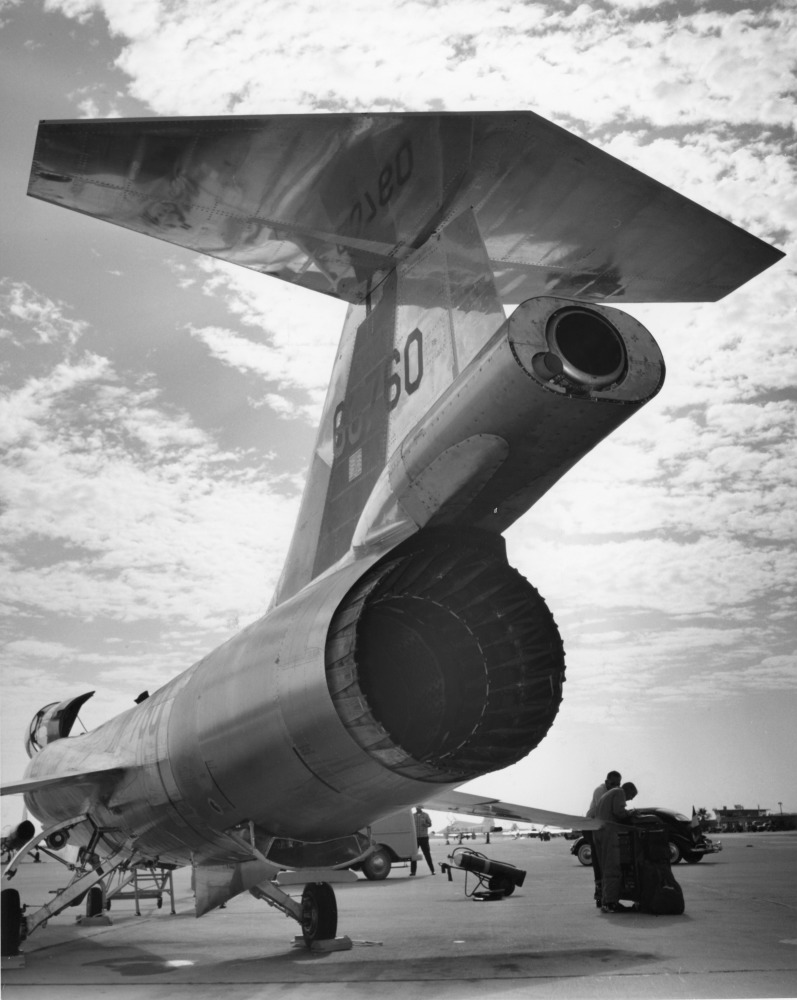
- AR2 installation of the Lockheed NF-104A
- Type: liquid-fuelled rocket engine
- National origin: United States
- Manufacturer: Rocketdyne
- First run: 1950s
- Major applications: Lockheed NF-104A; North American F-86F(R)

The Rocketdyne AR2, also known by the military designation LR42, was a family of liquid-fuelled rocket engines designed and produced in the United States (US) during the 1950s and 1960s.

== Design and development ==
The Rocketdyne division of North American Aviation developed a relatively small liquid-fuelled rocket engine for thrust augmentation of manned aircraft during the late 1950s. The AR2 is a single-chamber rocket engine burning kerosene (JP-4 or JP-5) jet fuel, oxidised with 90% High Test Peroxide (H_{2}O_{2} / HTP), allowing the engine to use the same fuel as an aircraft fuel system. The variable-thrust AR2 is a direct development of the fixed thrust AR1, which was given the military designation LR36.

The AR2-3 had variable-thrust and single lever throttle control, regulating flow of oxidiser to the turbo-pump gas-generator and thus flow of propellants to the combustion chamber.

== Operational history ==
Initial flight trials were carried out attached to the belly of North American F-86F-30-NA Sabre (52-4608 / FU-608) re-designated F-86F(R), boosting performance to a top speed of M1.22 at 60,000 ft (18,288 m).

The AR2-3 was evaluated in 1999 as part of the Future-X Demonstrator Engine project, for possible use in the Boeing X-37 Reusable Upper Stage Vehicle at a thrust of 6,600 lbf (29.34 kN), with a specific impulse of 245 seconds.

== Variants ==
AR-1
(YLR36-NA-2) Initial fixed-thrust variant.
AR2-1
(YLR42-NA-2) prototype, test and development variable-thrust engines.
AR2-2
test and development engines.
AR2-3
Production engines for research and development projects like the NF-104A.

== Applications ==
- North American F-86F(R)
- Lockheed NF-104A

== Specifications (AR2-3) ==
Data from Astronautix : AR2-3 and Aircraft engines of the World 1964/65.

=== General characteristics ===
- Type: liquid-fuelled rocket engine
- Length:
- Diameter:
- Dry weight:
- Fuel: Kerosene (JP-4 / JP-5)
- Oxidiser: High-test peroxide (H_{2}O_{2})

=== Components ===
- Pumps: turbopumps driven by High-test peroxide (H_{2}O_{2}) decomposed by a catalyst

=== Performance ===
- Thrust: 3,000 lbf (13.34 kN) to 6,000 lbf (26.69 kN)
  - Combustion chamber temperature: 4,600 °F (2,811 K; 2,538 °C)
  - Combustion chamber pressure: 560 psi (3,861 kPa)
  - Specific impulse: 245 seconds
- Burn time:
