= Rolls-Royce RZ.2 =

Rocket engine design

RZ.2
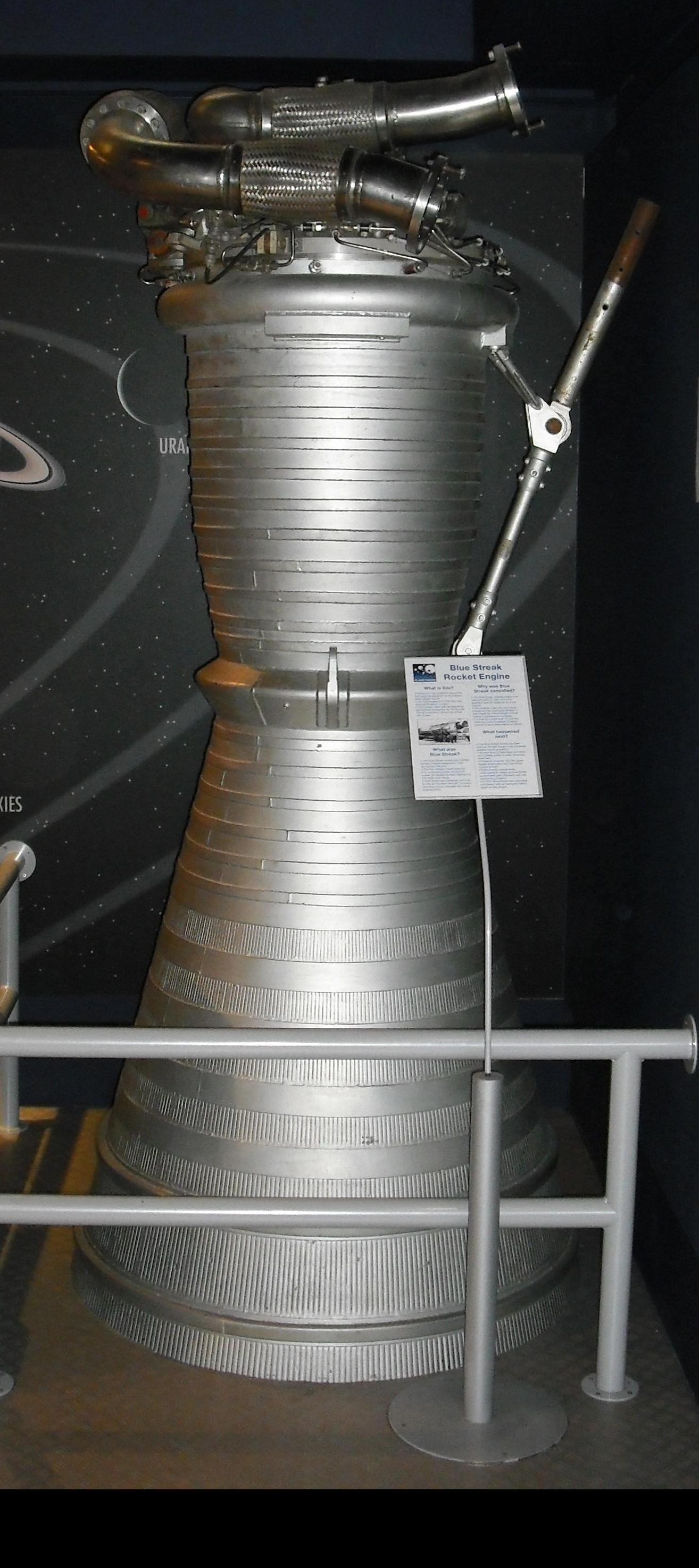
- Country of origin: United Kingdom
- Application: 1st stage booster

Liquid-fuel engine
- Propellant: LOX / kerosene

Performance
- Thrust, sea-level: 137,000 lbf (610 kN)

The RZ.2 was a British design for a liquid oxygen (LOX) / kerosene-fuelled rocket engine to power the Blue Streak (missile).

The design was a development of the Rolls-Royce RZ.1 rocket engine, which had in turn been a development by Rolls-Royce of the Rocketdyne S-3D. Rolls-Royce, Ansty was the design authority.

Two variants of this engine were developed: the first provided a static thrust of 137,000 lbf (610 kN) and the second (intended for the three-stage satellite launch vehicle) 150,000 lbf (670 kN). The engines could be vectored by seven degrees in flight for guidance.

Some disconnected facts for arrangement:

The Efflux chamber of the engine was made of nickel tubes brazed together, through which flowed kerosene down one tube and back up the adjacent tube via a manifold at the mouth of the chamber. After static firings, these chambers were checked by climbing inside the engine from beneath. The mouth was 6 feet (1.8 m) in diameter, but that of the throat was smaller, which restricted access to the inspector. In addition, during firing, the inside of the chamber became coated with fine carbon, making inspection a filthy procedure. However, the chamber required careful inspection because firing would occasionally create small holes in the walls.

At the head of the chamber was the injector plate with concentric circles of LOX and kerosene injectors arranged in such a way that the liquid jets hit one another, like on like. The outer ring of kerosene injectors helped cool the tubes that formed the chamber walls. From memory, the LOX pressure was 720 psi (5.0 MPa) and the kerosene 450 psi (3.1 MPa). The start sequence was as follows: -10 secs The start tanks were pressurized. -7.5 secs The blade valves opened to allow fuel and oxidant to flow to the gas generator and on to the pump turbines. These turbines accelerated from 0 to 30,000 rpm in 32 ms and drove pumps through a 6-to-1 reduction gearbox, which forced the propellants into the engines. -4 s main engine burn commenced. -2.5 s Full thrust was achieved. 0 s Vehicle release.

Lift off was required to be at 1.3 g to enable the ground equipment to be cleared. Bearing in mind the nature of the autopilot, the vehicle tended to rotate about its long axis and move laterally at release as a result of small corrections implemented through the vectoring of the engines. With the RZ2 Mk 3 developing 150,000 lbf (670,000 N) of thrust, this meant that the all-up weight of the vehicle at lift-off was about 230,000 lbf (1,000,000 N). Because of the limited gain change abilities of the autopilot, as the weight of the vehicle fell, the corrections applied by vectoring the engines were more vigorous; at lighter weights and even on ground tests the engines were seen not to be entirely rigid as the mouth of the chamber moved slightly after the corrections were applied by the hydraulic rams. These rams were fed by hydraulic fluid at about 3,000 psi (21 MPa).

The dynamic pressure at the chamber mouth was about 6 psi (41 kPa).

== Display examples ==
- Solway Aviation Museum, Carlisle Airport, Cumbria, UK
- Alongside the Blue Streak at the National Space Centre in Leicester
- Armagh Planetarium
- The Euro Space Center in Redu, Belgium.
- Imperial War Museum Duxford, Cambridgeshire.
- The Woomera Missile Park in South Australia (recovered after flight)
