= Val Cleaver =

British rocket engineer (1917–1977)

- Born: 14 February 1917; Horspath, Oxfordshire, England
- Died: 16 September 1977 (aged 60)
- Occupation: aerospace engineer

Arthur Valentine Cleaver OBE FRAeS (14 February 1917 – 16 September 1977) was a distinguished British rocket engineer. He co-authored a paper which discussed the possibilities and problems of nuclear rocket engines in 1948. After the Second World War he developed de Havilland's Sprite and Spectre rocket engines. He moved to Rolls-Royce in 1957 and in 1960 he became general manager and chief engineer of the Rolls-Royce's rocket departments, where he was responsible for the engines which powered the Blue Streak missile and Black Arrow launch vehicle. While the ELDO vehicle was ultimately unsuccessful and abandoned, the Blue Streak vehicle and its engines worked perfectly on every launch, and Cleaver was awarded the OBE for his part in developing them.

== Early life ==
He was born at Conway in Wales to Percy and Mildred Cleaver. From the age of 11 he became fascinated by space. For three years from 1931 he attended Acton Technical College. He joined the British Interplanetary Society (BIS) in 1937, aged 20.

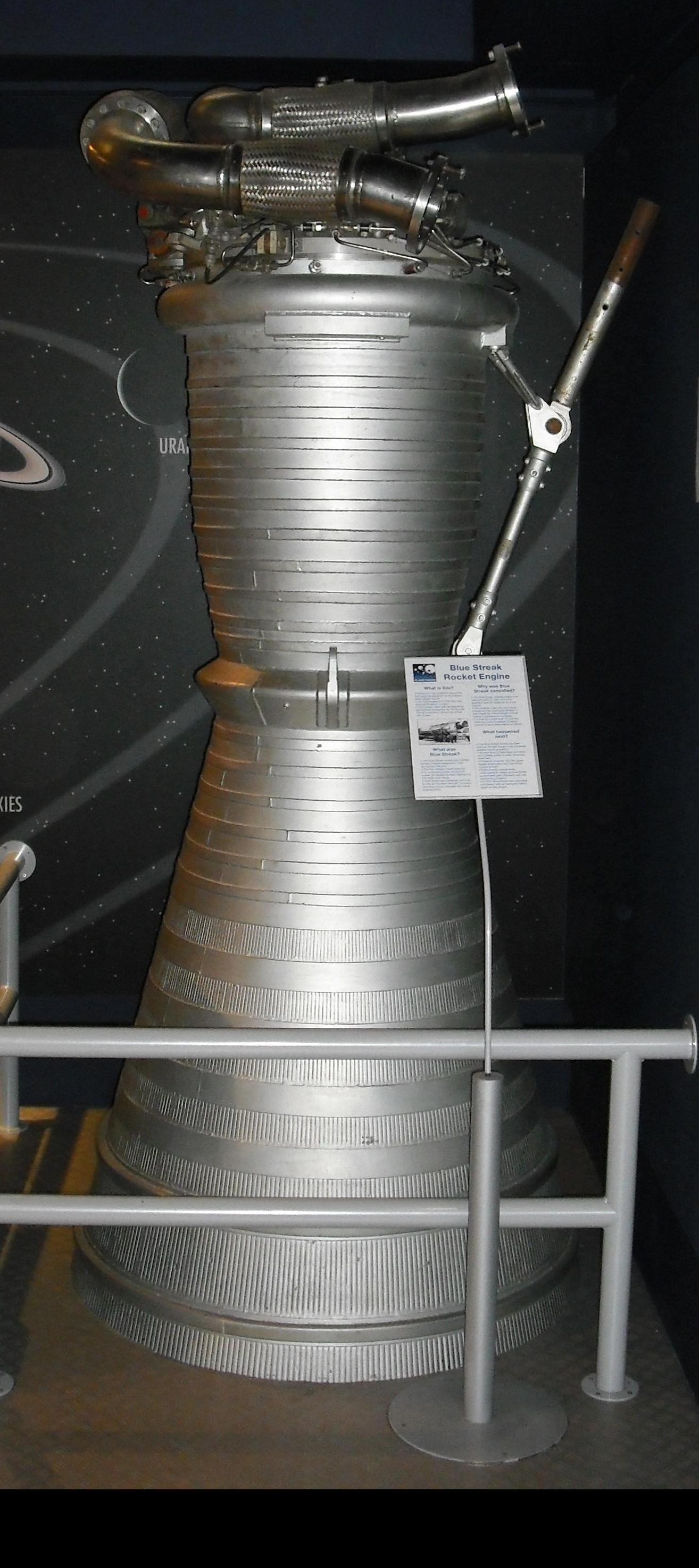
Rolls-Royce RZ.2, which he was responsible for

== Career ==
=== de Havilland ===
In 1935, aged 18, he joined the Propeller Division of de Havilland, where he later became Chief Project Engineer of the de Havilland Propeller Company. He moved back to de Havilland where Frank Halford was Technical Director of their engine company. He was commissioned by Frank Halford to conduct a study into rocket engines, and their (unknown) capabilities. He began his studies in April 1946 forming a rocket team at de Havilland Engine Company.

In the 1950s he oversaw the development of the Sprite and Spectre rocket engines, developed for rocket-assisted takeoff and mixed power plant installations for military aircraft. During this period he became friends with Maurice Brennan, the Chief Designer at Saunders-Roe, who designed the SR.53 mixed power interceptor; this was the first rocket-powered British aircraft.

=== Rolls-Royce ===
In 1956 he handed in his notice at de Havilland and became Chief Rocket Propulsion Engineer of Rolls-Royce's new rocket engine division. Under his guidance the RZ.2 rocket engine was developed, an advanced engine for its time. For the work on this engine he was awarded the OBE.

He worked with Rocketdyne.

== Personal life ==
In 1955 he argued that photographs taken from space of the Earth would transform people's psychological outlook. In 1957 at the International Congress of Astronautics he said that, in aviation, predictions ran behind actual events.

Val was best friends with the science fiction writer Arthur C. Clarke and their correspondence was voluminous. It is available in the Arthur C. Clarke Collection of Sri Lanka housed at the Smithsonian's National Air and Space Museum.

He died aged 60. His funeral was held on 6 October 1977 in Enfield.
