= Blue Streak (missile) =

British ballistic missile

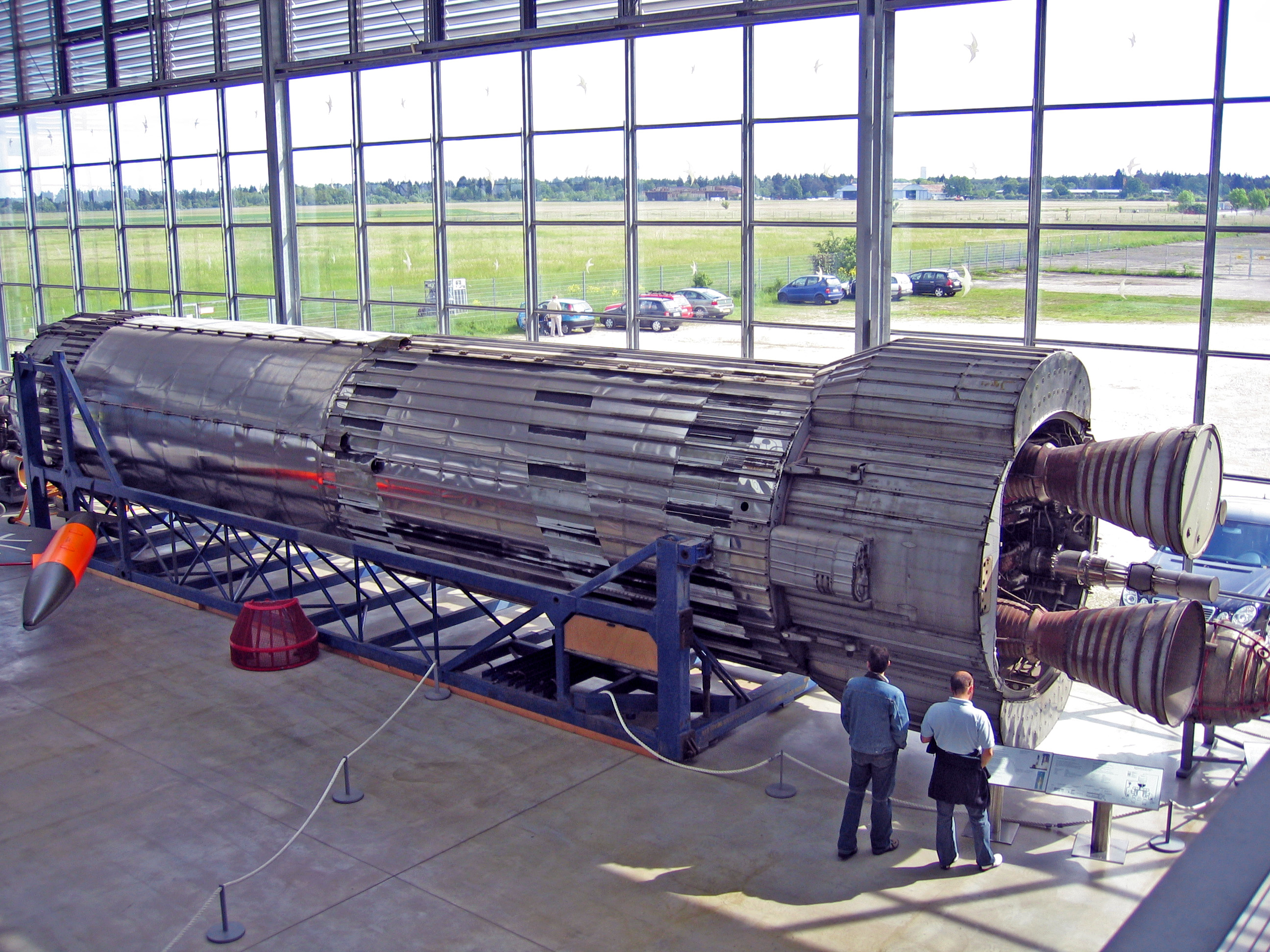
- Blue Streak at the Deutsches Museum, Schleissheim, Munich
- Function: Nuclear strike, satellite vehicle
- Manufacturer: de Havilland Propellers, Hawker Siddeley Dynamics , Raytheon, Hallicrafters (maintenance and technical support)
- Country of origin: United Kingdom

Size
- Height: 80 ft (24.38 m)

Capacity

Payload to LEO

Launch history
- Status: Retired since 1971
- Launch sites: Woomera Test Range; Guiana Space Centre
- First flight: 5 June 1964
- Last flight: 5 November 1971

stage
- Powered by: Rolls-Royce RZ.2
- Propellant: liquid oxygen/kerosene

The de Havilland Propellers Blue Streak was a British Intermediate-range ballistic missile (IRBM), and later the first stage of the Europa satellite launch vehicle. Blue Streak was cancelled without entering full production.

The project was intended to maintain an independent British nuclear deterrent, replacing the V bomber fleet which would become obsolete by 1965. The operational requirement for the missile was issued in 1955 and the design was complete by 1957. During development, it became clear that the missile system was too expensive and too vulnerable to a surprise attack. The missile project was cancelled in 1960, with US-led Skybolt the preferred replacement.

After Blue Streak's cancellation as a weapon system, the Macmillan government considered using the redundant rocket system for space launch purposes. Studies had examined the feasibility of using Blue Streak as the first stage of a British satellite launch vehicle, usually with a derivative of Black Knight as the second stage, but this option was considered impractical and too expensive. Millard writes that, by offering Blue Streak and associated British infrastructure and expertise for a European launcher programme, Harold Macmillan recovered some of the political ground lost after the missile's cancellation and demonstrated Britain's credentials as a prospective member of the European Common Market. This led to the creation of the European Launcher Development Organisation (ELDO), whose Europa launcher used Blue Streak as its first stage.

Europa was tested at the Woomera Test Range in Australia and later at Kourou in French Guiana. After repeated launch failures, the programme was wound down: the European Space Conference agreed in December 1972 to back the French L3S project, which became Ariane, and to cancel Europa 3, and the ELDO Council decided in April 1973 to close the Europa 2 programme.

== Background ==
Post-war Britain's nuclear weapons armament was initially based on free-fall bombs delivered by the V bomber force. It soon became clear that if Britain wanted to have a credible nuclear deterrent threat, a ballistic missile was essential. There was a political need for an independent deterrent, so that Britain could remain a major world power. Britain was unable to purchase American weapons wholesale due to the restrictions of the Atomic Energy Act of 1946.

In April 1954 the Americans proposed a joint development programme for ballistic missiles. The United States would develop an intercontinental ballistic missile (ICBM) of 5,000 nautical miles (9,300 km) range (SM-65 Atlas), while the United Kingdom with United States support would develop an Intermediate-range ballistic missile (IRBM) of 2,000 nautical miles (3,700 km) range. The proposal was accepted as part of the Wilson-Sandys Agreement of August 1954, which provided for collaboration, exchange of information, and mutual planning of development programmes. The decision to develop was influenced by what could be learnt about missile design and development in the US. Initial requirements for the booster were made by the Royal Aircraft Establishment at Farnborough with input on the rocket engine design from the Rocket Propulsion Establishment at Westcott. Operational Requirement 1139 demanded a rocket of at least 1,500 nautical miles (2,800 km) range and the initially proposed rocket would have just reached that threshold.

== Development ==
The de Havilland Propellers company won the contract to build the missile, which was to be powered by an uprated liquid-fuelled Rocketdyne S-3D engine, developed by Rolls-Royce, called RZ.2. Two variants of this engine were developed: the first provided a static thrust of 137,000 lbf (610 kN) and the second (intended for the three-stage satellite launch vehicle) 150,000 lbf (670 kN). The engines could be vectored by seven degrees in flight and were used to guide the missile. This configuration, however, put considerable pressure on the autopilot which had to cope with the problem of a vehicle whose weight was diminishing rapidly and that was steered by large engines whose thrust remained more or less constant. Vibration was also a problem, particularly at engine cut-off, and the later development of the autopilot for the satellite launcher was, in itself, a considerable achievement.

Subcontractors included the Sperry Gyroscope Company who produced the missile guidance system whilst the nuclear warhead was designed by the Atomic Weapons Research Establishment at Aldermaston.

The missiles used liquid oxygen and kerosene propellants. Whilst the vehicle could be left fully laden with over 20 tonnes of kerosene, the 60 tonnes of liquid oxygen had to be loaded immediately before launch or icing became a problem. Due to this, fuelling the rocket took 4.5 minutes, which would have made it useless as a rapid response to an attack. The missile was vulnerable to a pre-emptive nuclear strike, launched without warning or in the absence of any heightening of tension sufficient to warrant readying the missile. To negate this problem de Havilland created a stand-by feature. A missile could be held at 30 seconds' notice to launch for ten hours. As the missiles were to be deployed in pairs and it took ten hours for one missile to be prepared for stand-by, one of the two missiles could always be ready for rapid launch.

To protect the missiles against a pre-emptive strike while being fuelled, the idea of sitting the missiles in underground launchers was developed. These would have been designed to withstand a one megaton blast at a distance of one-half mile (800 m) and were a British innovation, subsequently exported to the United States. Finding sites for these silos proved extremely difficult. RAF Spadeadam in Cumberland (now Cumbria) was the only site where construction was started on a full scale underground launcher, although test borings were undertaken at a number of other locations. The remains of this test silo, known as U1, were rediscovered by tree felling at Spadeadam in 2004. This was also the site where the RZ.2 rocket engines and also the complete Blue Streak missile were tested. The best sites for silo construction were the more stable rock strata in parts of southern and north-east England and eastern Scotland, but the construction of many underground silos in the countryside carried enormous economic, social, and political costs. Development of the underground launchers presented a major technical challenge. 1/60- and 1/6-scale models based on a U-shaped design were constructed and tested at RPE Westcott. Three alternative designs were drawn up with one chosen as the prototype, designated K11. RAF Upavon would appear to have been the preferred location for the prototype operational launcher with the former RNAS at Crail as the likely first operational site.

In 1955–1956, the rocket motors were test-fired at High Down Rocket Test Site on the Isle of Wight. As no site in Britain provided enough space for test flights, a test site was established at Woomera, South Australia.

Blue Streak launches from Woomera
Flight No.	Launch date	Result
F1	5 June 1964	uncontrollable oscillations during final phase of burn due to fuel sloshing in tanks
F2	21 October 1964	Successful flight
F3	23 March 1965	Successful flight

== Cancellation as a military project ==
Doubts about the programme grew as development lagged behind American missile projects: while the American Thor and Atlas rockets were ready for testing by 1957, Blue Streak was still at an early design stage, and by 1959 Britain had not yet built a prototype. The programme's cost had also risen substantially, with the National Space Centre stating that it had escalated by about 600% compared with the original estimate.

Estimates within the Civil Service for completion of the project ranged from a total spend of £550 million to £1.3 billion, as different ministers were set on either abandoning or continuing the project.

The project was unexpectedly cancelled in April 1960. Whitehall opposition grew, and it was cancelled on the ostensible grounds that it would be too vulnerable to a first-strike attack. Admiral of the Fleet Lord Mountbatten had spent considerable effort arguing that the project should be cancelled at once in favour of the Navy being armed with nuclear weapons, capable of pre-emptive strike.

The cancellation also affected Australia's role in the programme, since the Woomera range had been established as an Anglo-Australian project and the Australian Government had, according to the British government, carried the "lion's share" of the cost of establishing the range. Later in 1960, British and Australian ministers discussed the possible use of Woomera and Blue Streak for satellite launches.

The British military transferred its hopes for a strategic nuclear delivery system to the Anglo-American Skybolt missile, before the project's cancellation by the United States as its ICBM programme reached maturity. The British instead purchased the Polaris system from the Americans, carried in British-built submarines.

== Civilian programmes – Black Prince and ELDO ==
After the cancellation as a military project, there was reluctance to cancel the project because of the huge cost incurred. Blue Streak would have become the first stage of a projected all British satellite launcher known as "Black Prince": the second stage was derived from the Black Knight test vehicle, and the orbital injection stage was a small hydrogen peroxide/kerosene motor.

Black Prince proved too expensive for the UK, and the European Launcher Development Organisation (ELDO) was set up. This used Blue Streak as the first stage, with French and German second and third stages. The Blue Streak first stage was successfully tested three times at the Woomera test range in Australia as part of the ELDO programme.

=== Black Prince ===
In 1959, a year before the cancellation of the Blue Streak as a missile, the government requested that the RAE and Saunders-Roe design a carrier rocket based on Blue Streak and Black Knight. This design used Blue Streak as a first stage and a 54-inch (1.37-metre) second stage based on the Black Knight. Several different third stages would be available, depending on the required payload and orbit.

The cost of developing Black Prince was estimated to be £35 million.

It was planned that Black Prince would be a Commonwealth project. As the government of John Diefenbaker in Canada was already spending more money than publicly acknowledged on Alouette satellite and Australia was not interested in the project, these two countries were unwilling to contribute. South Africa was no longer a member of the Commonwealth. New Zealand was only likely to make "modest" contributions.

=== European Launcher Development Organisation ===
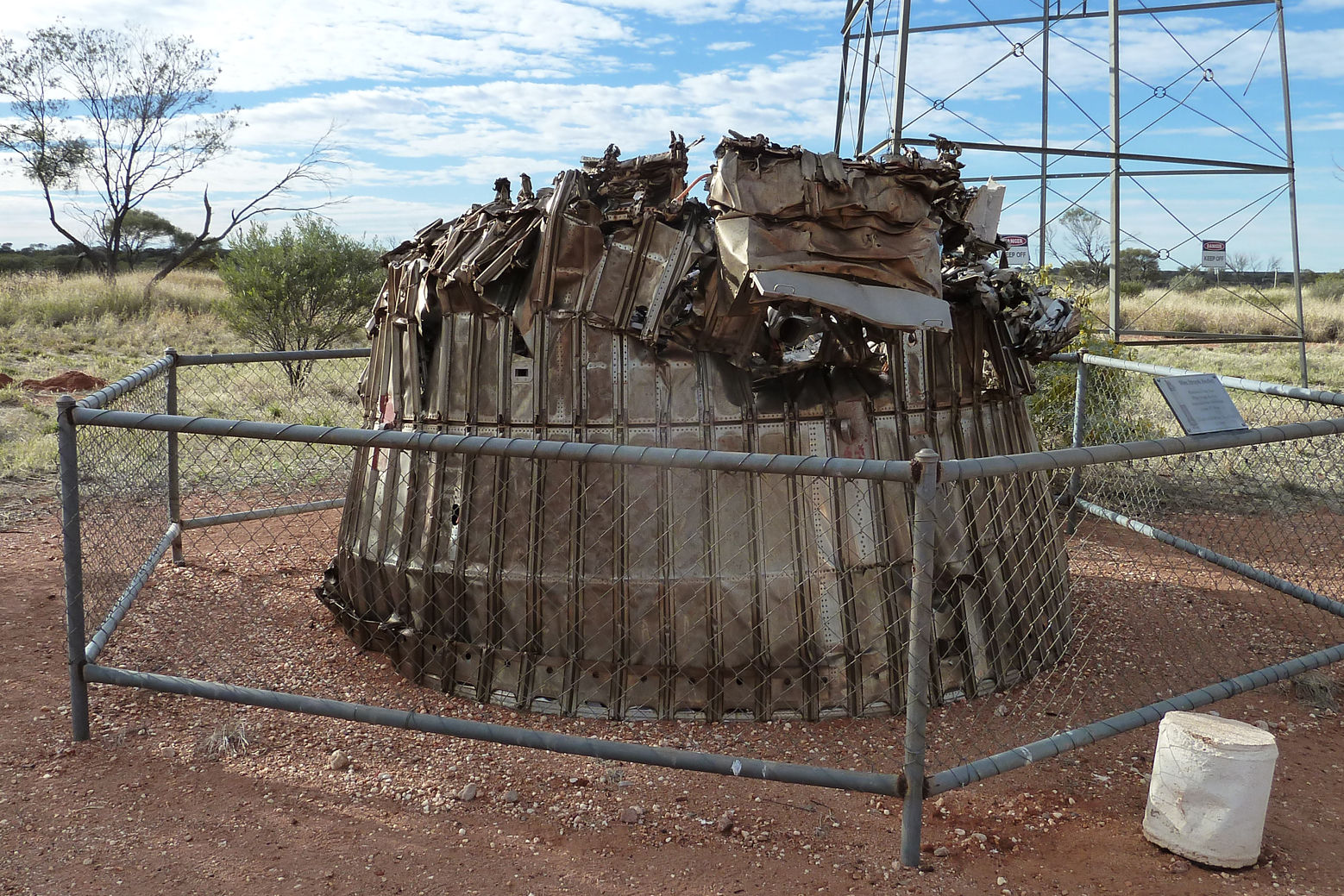
The placard reads: "Remains of the first Blue Streak rocket launched from Woomera 5 June 1964. Discovered 50 km SE of Giles in 1980."

The UK instead proposed a collaboration with other European countries to build a three-stage launcher capable of placing a one-ton payload into low Earth orbit. The European Launcher Development Organisation consisted of Belgium, Britain, France, West Germany, Italy and the Netherlands, with Australia as an associate member.

Preliminary work began in 1962 and ELDO was formally signed into existence in 1964.

With Blue Streak, the UK became the first stage of the European launch vehicle with France providing the Coralie second stage and Germany the third. Italy worked on the satellite project, the Netherlands and Belgium concentrated on tracking and telemetry systems and Australia supplied the launch site.

The combined launcher was named Europa.

After ten test launches, the Woomera launch site was not suitable for putting satellites into geosynchronous orbit, and in 1966 it was decided to move to the French site of Kourou in South America. F11 was fired from here in November 1971, but the failure of the autopilot caused the vehicle to break up. The launch of F12 was postponed whilst a project review was carried out, which led to the decision to abandon the Europa design.

ELDO was merged with the European Space Research Organisation to form the European Space Agency.

List of Blue Streak launches as part of ELDO
Flight No.	Launch date	Version	First stage (Blue Streak)	Second stage (Corali)	Third stage (Astris)	Payload	Result
F4	24 May 1966	Europa-1	successful	untested	untested	untested	Successful flight
F5	15 November 1966	Europa-1	successful	untested	untested	untested	Successful flight
F6.1	4 June 1967	Europa-1	successful	failed	untested	untested	2nd stage failed to ignite
F6.2	6 December 1967	Europa-1	successful	failed	failed	failed	2nd stage failed to separate
F7	29 November 1968	Europa-1	successful	successful	failed	failed	3rd stage failure after separation
F8	3 July 1969	Europa-1	successful	successful	failed	failed	3rd stage failure after separation
F9	24 June 1970	Europa-1	successful	successful	successful	failed	Fairing failed to separate
F11	5 November 1971	Europa-2	successful	successful	successful	failed	Guidance system failed
F12	n/a			untested	untested	untested	Delivered to French Guiana
F13	n/a			untested	untested	untested	Delivered to National Museum of Flight, near Edinburgh
F14	n/a			untested	untested	untested	Delivered to Deutsches Museum, Munich
F15	n/a			untested	untested	untested	Delivered to Euro Space Center, Redu, Belgium
F16	n/a			untested	untested	untested	On display at NSC Leicester, on loan from Liverpool Museums
F17	n/a			n/a	n/a	n/a	Parts only completed
F18	n/a			n/a	n/a	n/a	Parts only completed

== Related projects ==
Aside from Black Prince, a range of other proposals was made between 1959 and 1972 for a carrier rocket based on Blue Streak, but none of these were ever built in full and today only exist in design.

=== De Havilland/British Interplanetary Society proposal ===
In 1959 de Havilland suggested solving the problem of the Blue Streak/Black Knight geometry by compressing the 10 by 1 metre (30 by 3-foot) Black Knight into a 10-foot-diameter (3.0 m) sphere. Although this seemed logical, the development costs proved to be too high for the limited budget of the programme.

=== Westland Helicopters Black Arrow ===
Following its merger with Saunders Roe, Westland Helicopters developed the three-stage Black Arrow satellite carrier rocket, derived from the Black Knight test vehicle. The first stage of Black Arrow was given the same diameter as the French Coralie (the second stage of Europa) to make it compatible with Blue Streak. Using Blue Streak as an additional stage would have increased Black Arrow's payload capacity. To maintain this compatibility, the first stage diameter was given in metres, although the rest of the rocket was defined in imperial units.

Black Arrow carried out four test launches (without an additional Blue Streak stage) from Woomera between 1969 and 1971, with the final launch carrying the satellite Prospero X-3 into orbit. The United Kingdom remains the only country to have developed and then abandoned a satellite launch capability.

=== Hawker Siddeley Dynamics proposal ===
In 1972, Hawker Siddeley Dynamics ltd produced a brochure for a design using Blue Streak as the first stage of a two-stage to orbit rocket, with an American Centaur upper stage. The Centaur second stage would have either been built in the UK under licence or imported directly from the USA. Both the Centaur and Blue Streak had proved to be very reliable up to this point, and since they were both already designed development costs would have been low. Furthermore, it had a payload of 870–920 kg to a geosynchronous orbit with, and 650–700 kg without the use of additional booster rockets.

== Blue Streak today ==
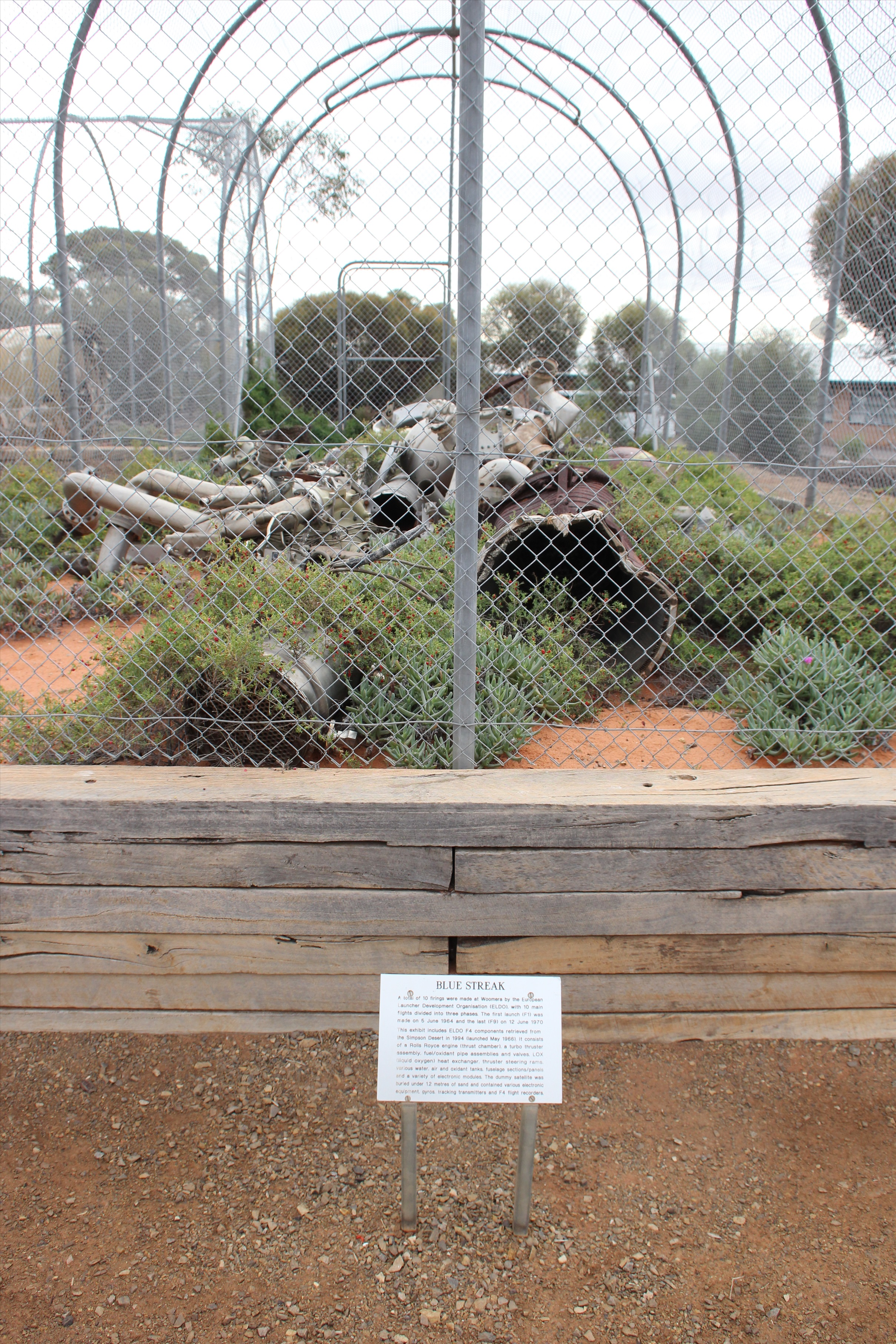
Blue Streak F4 rocket remains

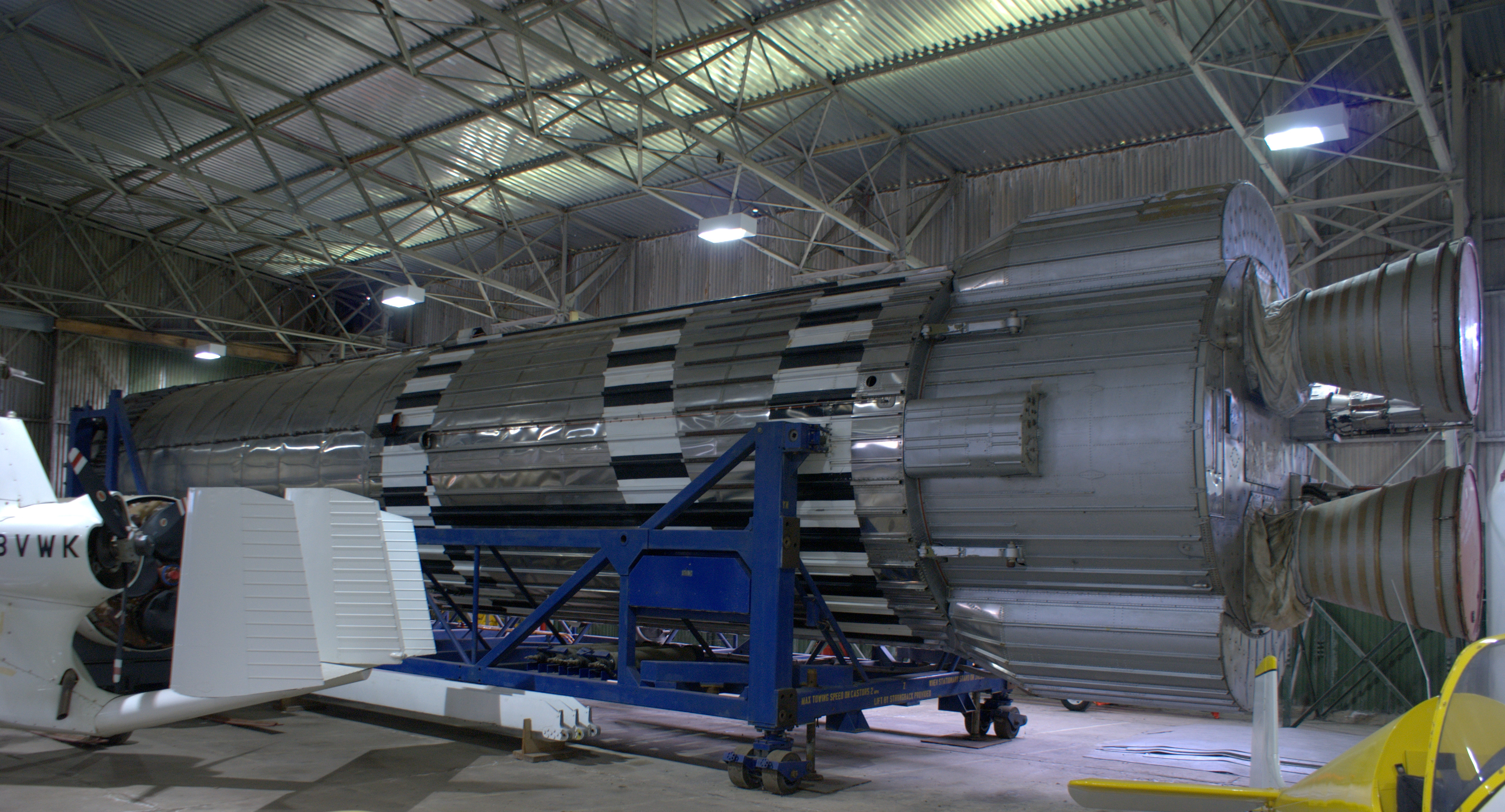
Europa F13 at the National Museum of Flight in East Fortune, Scotland.

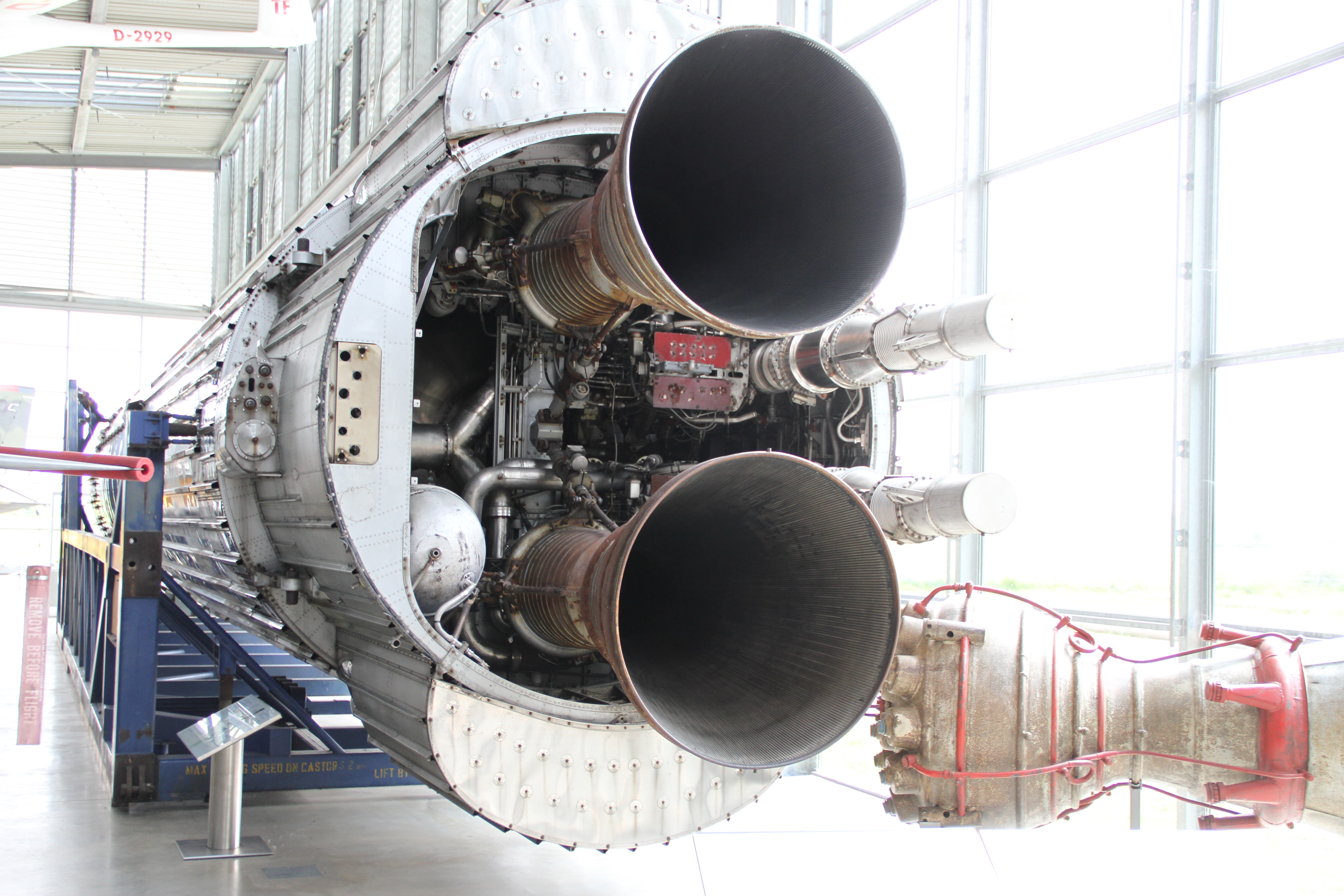
Europa F14, at the Deutsches Museum, Munich.

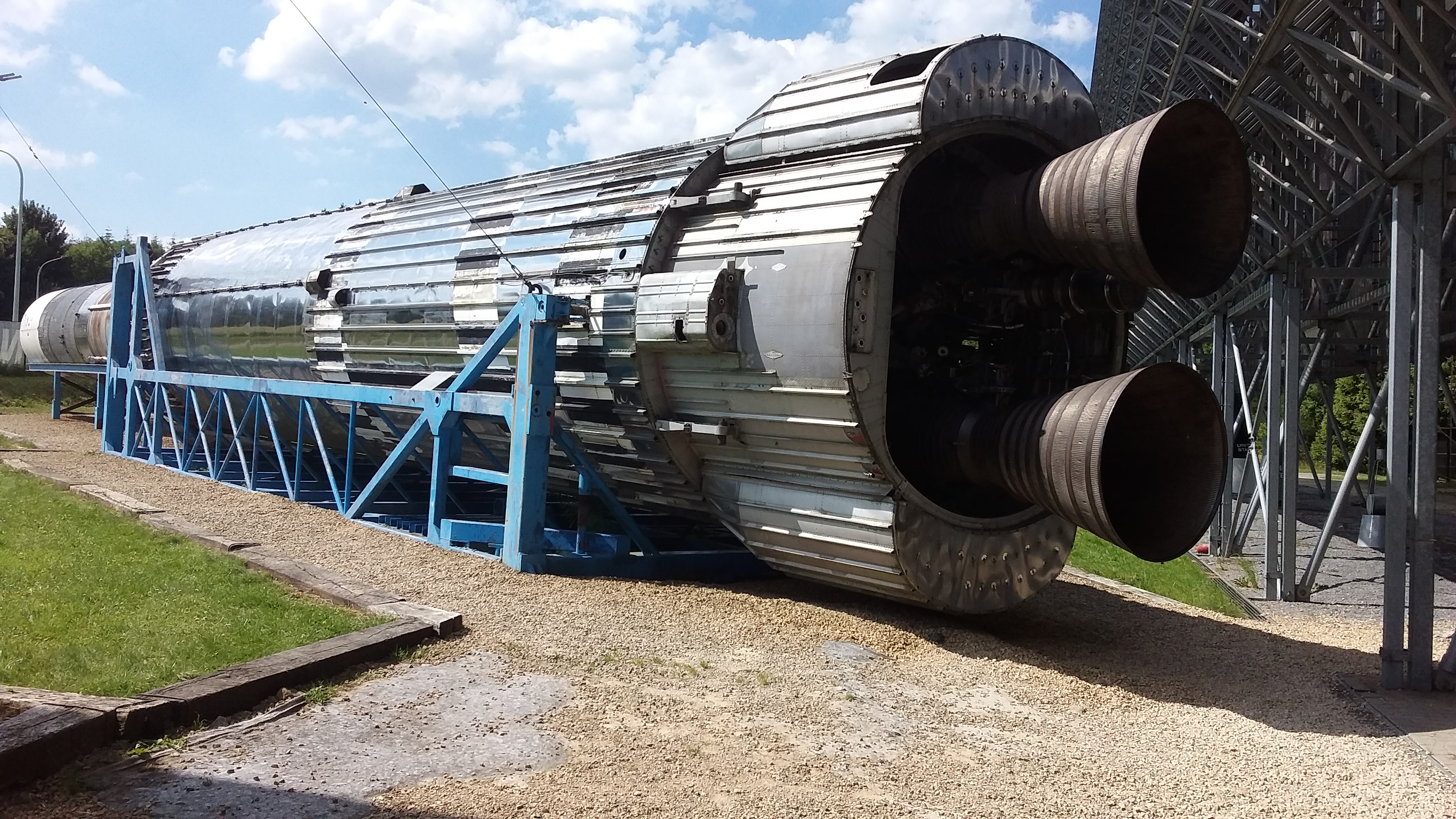
Europa F15, at the Euro Space Center in Redu, Belgium.

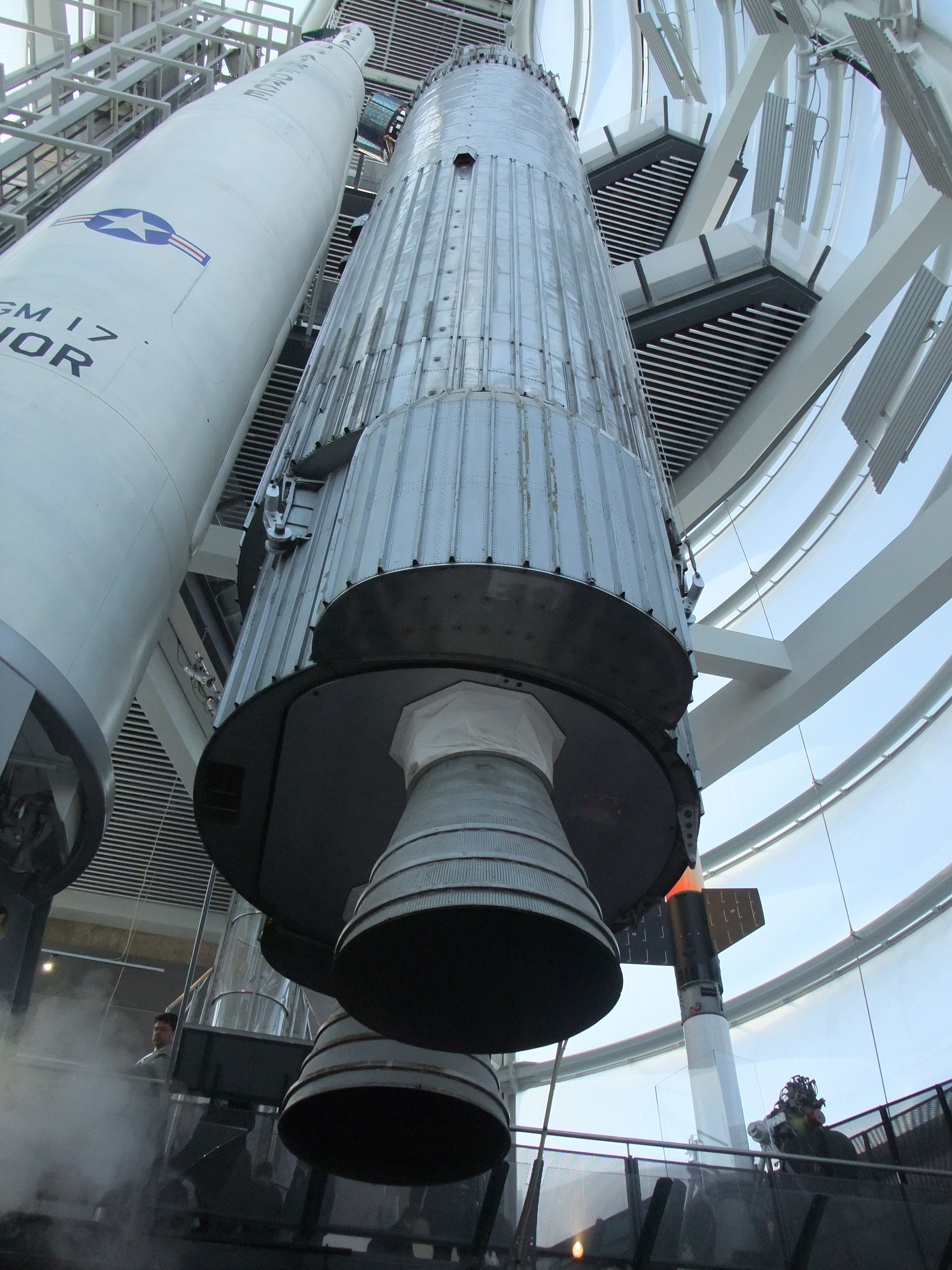
Europa F16, at the National Space Centre in Leicester, England.

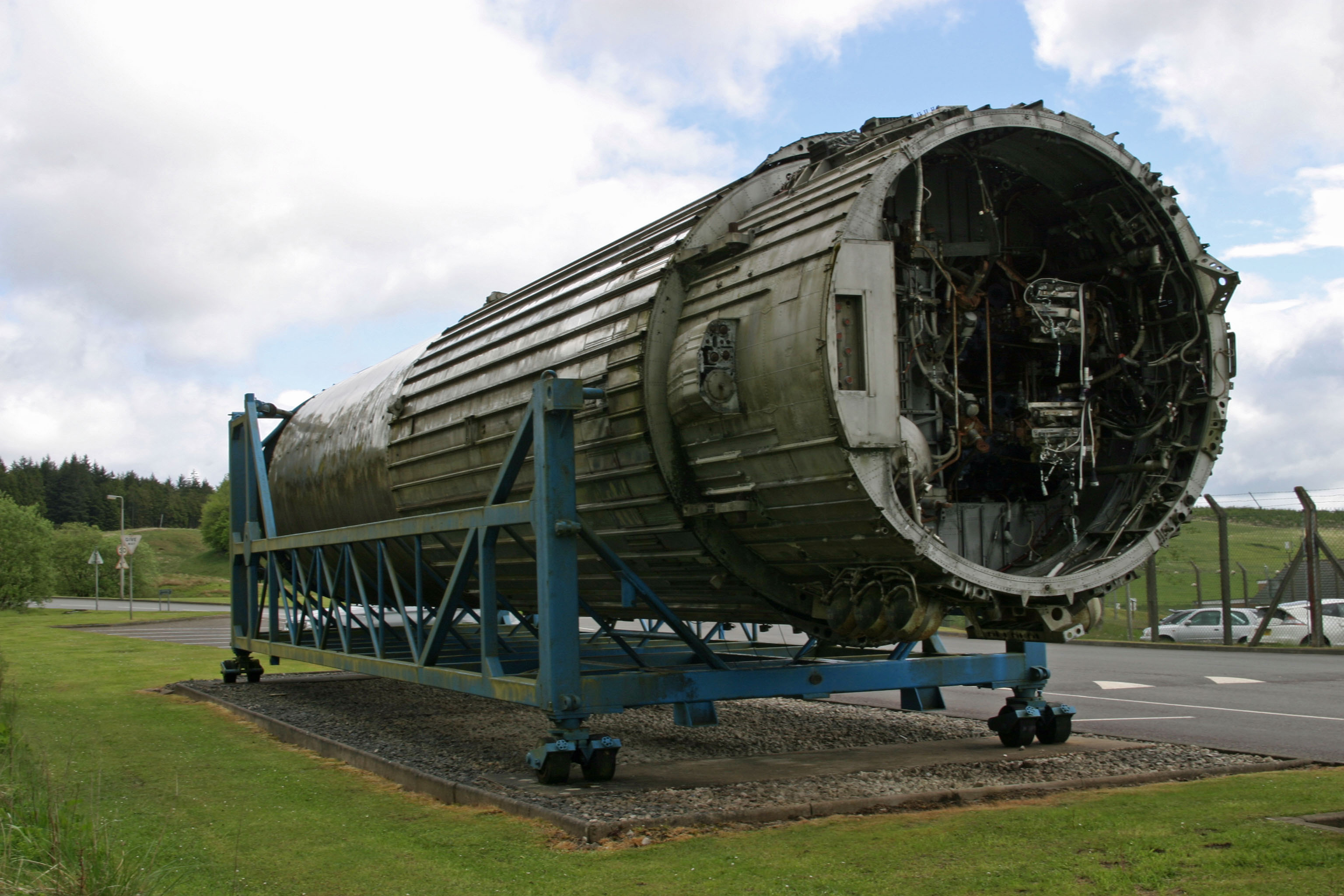
Mid-section outer shell, at the RAF Spadeadam near Brampton, England.

Following the cancellation of the Blue Streak project some of the remaining rockets were preserved at:

- Europa F13, at the National Museum of Flight in East Fortune, Scotland.
- Europa F14, at the Deutsches Museum, Munich.
- Europa F15, at the Euro Space Center in Redu, Belgium.
- Europa F16, at the National Space Centre in Leicester, England.
- Mid-section outer shell and launch sites, at the RAF Spadeadam near Brampton, England.

A section of the propulsion bay, engines and equipment can be found at the Solway Aviation Museum, Carlisle Lake District Airport. Only a few miles from the Spadeadam testing site, the museum carries many exhibits, photographs and models of the Blue Streak programme, having inherited the original Spadeadam collection that used to be displayed on site.

RZ.2 engines are on display at National Space Centre – a pair on cradles alongside the Blue Streak rocket – and at the Armagh Planetarium in Northern Ireland and The Euro Space Center in Redu, Belgium.

Blue Streak enthusiast Robin Joseph from the United Kingdom has a collection of parts including start systems and combustion chambers amongst other things. He can often be seen displaying his collection at space days in the West Midlands.

A part of the Blue Streak F1 rocket launched on 5 June 1964 from Woomera, Australia, found 50 km SE of Giles in 1980 (c.1000 km) is on display at Giles Weather Station. The titanium structure of a German third stage was, for some time, sited on the edge of a gravel pit in Gloucestershire.

Remains of Blue Streak F4, launched on 24 May 1965, are on display at Woomera.

Footage from the Blue Streak launch was briefly incorporated into The Prisoner's final episode, "Fall Out". It was also used in the Doctor Who serial "The Tenth Planet", treated within the story as the launch of the Zeus IV spacecraft. Images of the Blue Streak 1 are incorporated in the 1997 film Contact.

== See also ==
- List of missiles
- Nuclear weapons and the United Kingdom
- Rainbow Codes
- Black Arrow – (United Kingdom)
- Black Knight – (United Kingdom)
- Skylark – (United Kingdom)
- Silbervogel – (Nazi Germany)
- Martu
- Len Beadell
- Beatrice Shilling
- Roy Dommett
