= Redu Station =

Radio antenna station

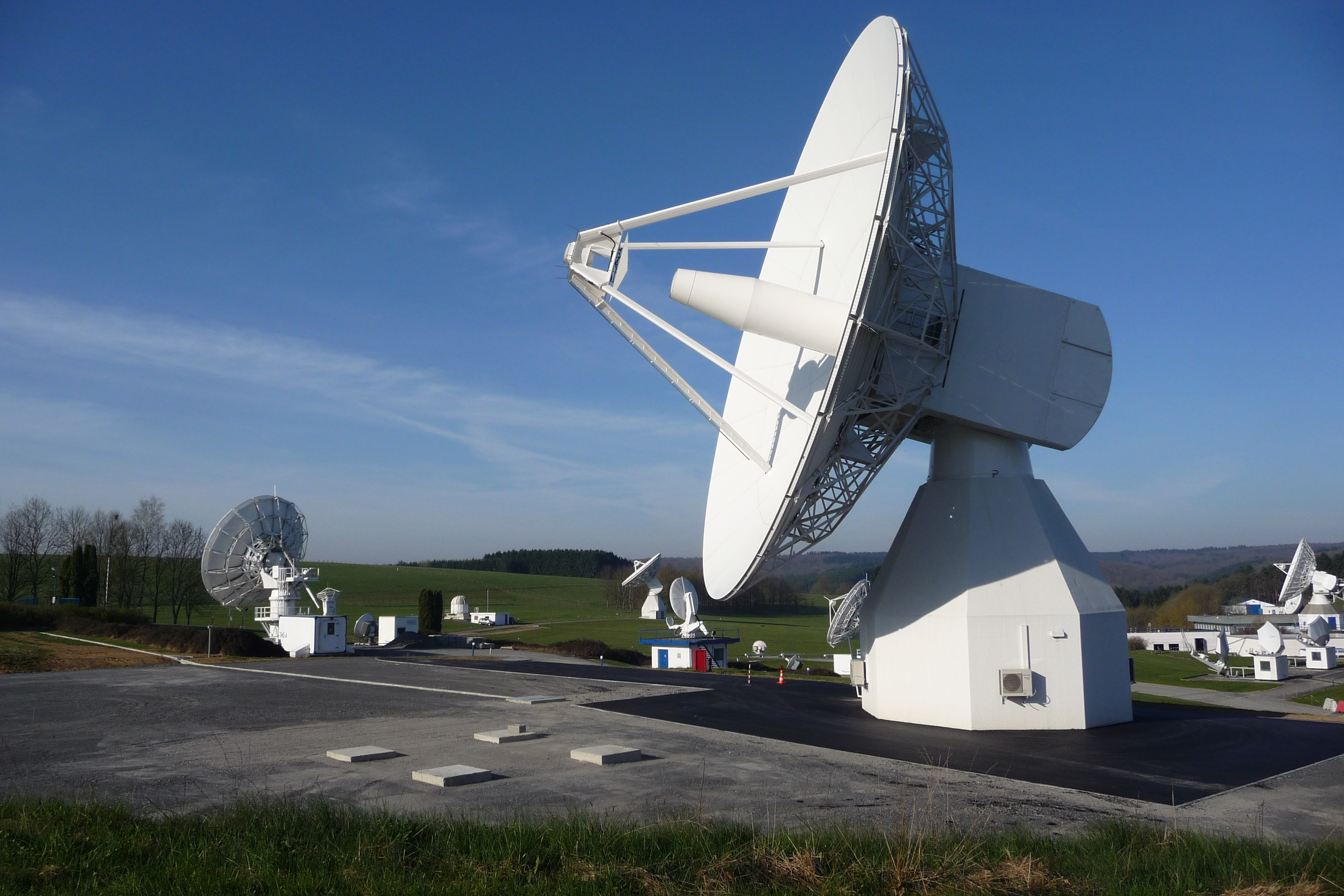
- Part of: European Space Security and Education Centre
- Location(s): Redu, Libin, Arrondissement of Neufchâteau, Luxembourg, Wallonia, Belgium
- Coordinates: 50°00′07″N 5°08′48″E
- Altitude: 387 m (1,270 ft)
- Diameter: 15 m (49 ft 3 in)
- Website: www.esa.int/Our_Activities/Operations/Estrack/Redu_station
- Location of Redu Station
- Related media on Commons

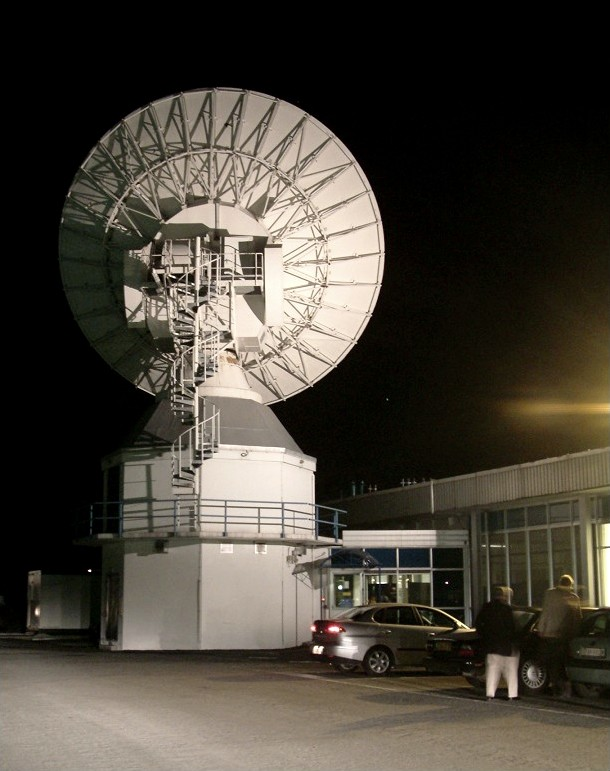
ESTRACK station in Redu, Belgium

Redu Station is an ESTRACK radio antenna station for communication with spacecraft. The station is located in Wallonia, about one kilometer away from the village of Redu, Belgium, where it has been tracking satellites since 1968. The ground terminals provide tracking capabilities in C band, L-band, S-band, K_{u} band, and K_{a} band as well as provide in-orbit tests of telecommunication satellites.

Redu Station was recognized and fully integrated as an ESA Centre in 2009.
