= Armagh Observatory =

Astronomical research institute in Armagh, Northern Ireland

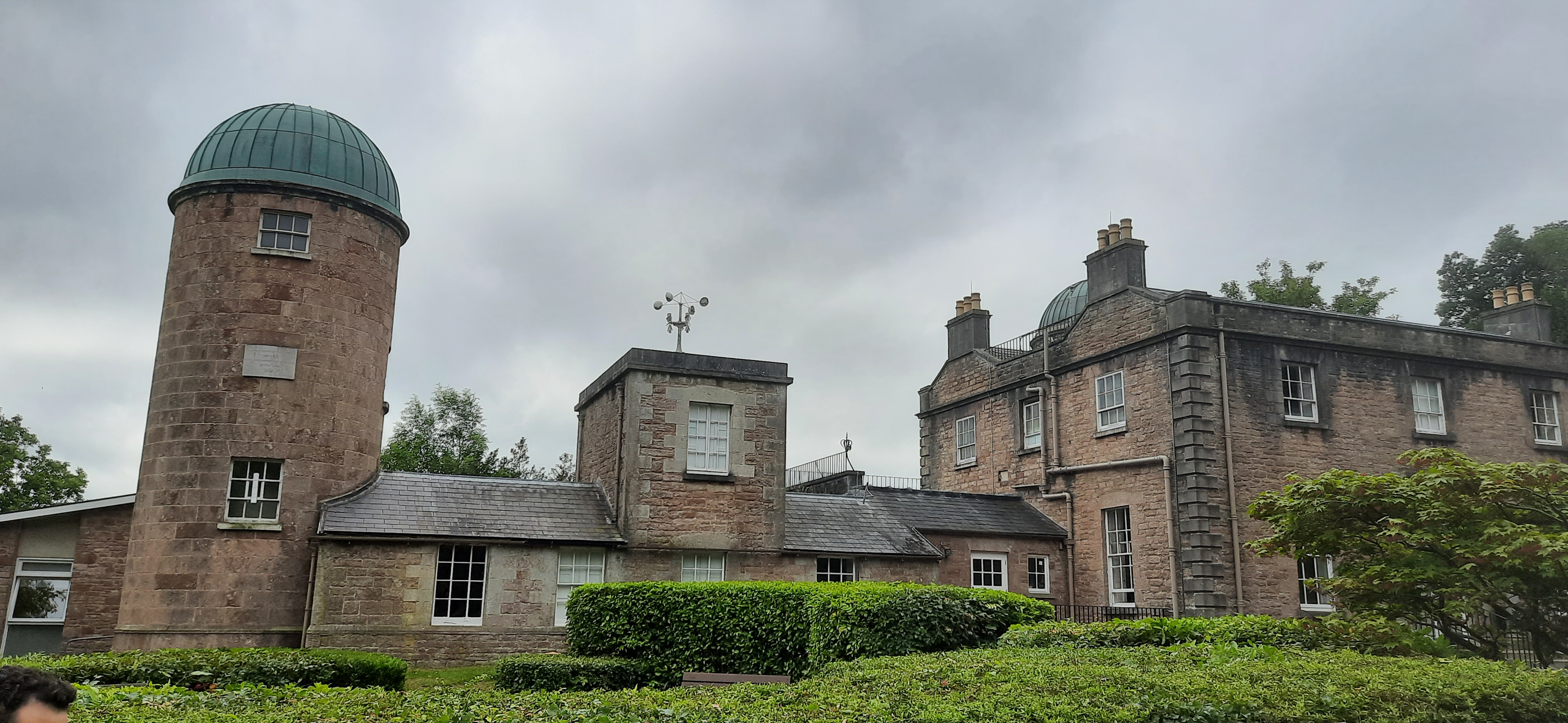
- Alternative names: Armagh Observatory & Planetarium
- Observatory code: 981
- Location: Armagh, Armagh City, Banbridge and Craigavon, Northern Ireland
- Coordinates: 54°21′11″N 6°39′00″W
- Established: 1789
- Website: www.armagh.space
- Location of Armagh Observatory
- Related media on Commons

Armagh Observatory is an astronomical research institute in Armagh, Northern Ireland. Around 25 astronomers are based at the observatory, studying stellar astrophysics, the Sun, Solar System astronomy and Earth's climate.

In 2018, Armagh Observatory was recognised for having 224 years of unbroken weather records.

== History ==
The Observatory is located close to the centre of the city of Armagh, adjacent to the Armagh Planetarium in approximately 14 acres (57,000 m^{2}) of landscaped grounds known as the Armagh Astropark. It was founded in 1789 by The Most Rev. and Rt Hon. The 1st Baron Rokeby, Church of Ireland Lord Primate of All Ireland and Lord Archbishop of Armagh.

From 1795 to 1797 Solar observations were made at Armagh, including measurements of sunspots.

The Estonian exile Ernst Öpik was based here for over 30 years and among his many contributions to astrophysics he wrote of the dangers of an asteroid impacting on the Earth.

One of the observatory's directors, Thomas Romney Robinson invented the cup anemometer, a device for measuring wind speed.

A plan was announced in 1949 to establish an Armagh Planetarium. After many years work the Planetarium opened in 1968, its first director was Patrick Moore. It celebrated its 50th anniversary in 2018.

In 2018, the observatory was given an award by Centennial Weather Station Award from the World Meteorological Organisation for 224 years of unbroken weather recordings. The records go back to 1794 and are also made available on the internet in the early 21st century.

In modern times the Observatory along with the nearby Planetarium and 14-acre Astropark are noted tourist attraction and education centre. The gardens, historical telescopes, and various astronomically related devices such as sundials are among some of the exhibits for visitors.

In 2025, the Irish Historic Astronomical Observatories, consisting of Dunsink Observatory, Birr Castle and Armagh Observatory, were added to the World Heritage Tentative List, a step towards becoming a UNESCO World Heritage Site.

== Facilities ==
There are scale models of the Solar System and the Universe, two sundials and historic telescopes, as well as telescope domes and other outdoor exhibits. The Human Orrery, launched in 2004, is located close to the main Observatory building. The Observatory's specialist library and archives, and collections of scientific instruments and artefacts associated with the development of modern astronomy, represent one of the leading collections of its kind in the British Isles.

== Instruments ==
A 2½ inch aperture refracting telescope by J & E Troughton was installed in a dome in 1795. The telescope was manufactured in London, and is noted for its late 18th century brass metal work. It is also known the Troughton Equatorial Telescope, for having an equatorial mounting.

The observatory has an Earnshaw Regulator. It is an accurate type of clock invented in 1791 by Thomas Earnshaw. Earnshaw travelled with it to Armagh to set it up in the new Observatory.

In the early 1800s it was reported to have a mural circle instrument. Another instrument at the observatory is a sunshine recorder.

In the 1830s the observatory bought a 15-inch reflecting telescope from the Grubb Telescope Company. The telescope used a speculum metal mirror mounted on an equatorial mount with clockwork-drive.

In 1885, a ten-inch aperture refracting telescope was installed, also by Grubb. This was installed in the Robinson dome.

Meridian marks can be found in the vicinity of the observatory, these look like stone arches, but were used to mark the location of the north-south line for the astronomical instruments. There is also another one in the form of an iron obelisk. The first meridian mark was built in 1793, and is in Tullyard, and it was used with the transit instrument.

In 2005, two wide-angle cameras for a meteor detection systems were installed.

== Research ==
The records of temperature take at Armagh Observatory between 1844 and 2004 were analyzed in 2006 research paper.

== List of directors ==
Directors of Armagh Observatory
| James Archibald Hamilton | 1790 - 1815 |
| William Davenport | 1815 - 1823 |
| Thomas Romney Robinson | 1823 - 1882 |
| John Louis Emil Dreyer | 1882 - 1916 |
| Joseph A. Hardcastle | 1917 |
| WFA Ellison | 1918 - 1936 |
| Eric Mervyn Lindsay | 1937 - 1974 |
| Mart de Groot | 1976 - 1994 |
| Mark E. Bailey | 1995 - 2016 |

Directors of Armagh Observatory and Planetarium
| Michael G. Burton | 2016 - |

== See also ==
- Royal Astronomical Society
- Markree Observatory (Irish observatory 1830s-1900, discovered the asteroid 9 Metis)
- List of astronomical observatories
- List of largest optical telescopes in the British Isles
