= Lindsay (crater) =

Small lunar impact crater in the central highlands of the Moon

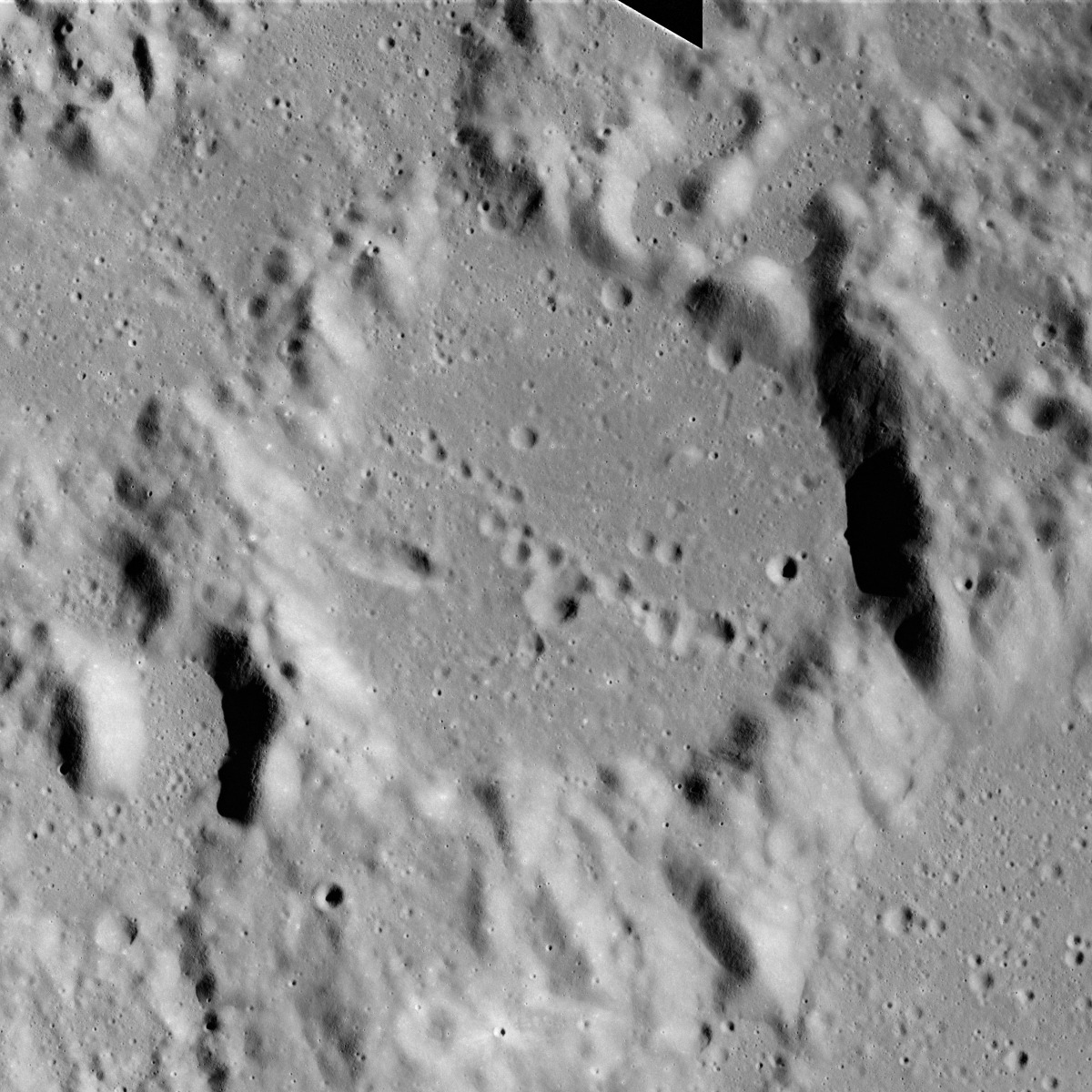
- Apollo 16 image
- Coordinates: 7.0°S 13.0°E
- Diameter: 32 km
- Depth: 1.6 km
- Colongitude: 347° at sunrise
- Eponym: Eric M. Lindsay

Lindsay is a small lunar impact crater in the central highlands of the Moon. It was named after the Irish astronomer Eric Mervyn Lindsay. It lies in the irregular terrain to the northwest of the landing site of the Apollo 16 mission. To the south is the crater Anděl, and Taylor is to the east-northeast.

E. J. Öpik stated that this crater was likely formed by the impact of an asteroid about 1 mile (1.6 km) in diameter. The outer rim of this crater is worn and irregular, with incisions along the northern and southern inner walls. There is a cleft in the southeastern rim that links with the slightly larger Dollond B. The interior floor is level and is crossed by a crater chain and a slender cleft at the west end.

This crater was designated Dollond C before being given its current name by the IAU. Dollond itself is located to the south-southeast, due east of Anděl.
