= Dollond (crater) =

Crater on the Moon

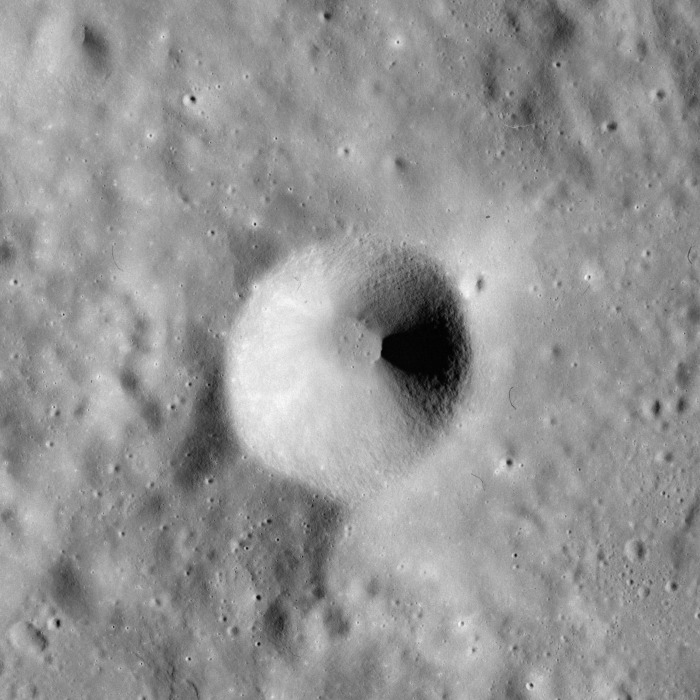
- Apollo 16 image
- Coordinates: 10.4°S 14.4°E
- Diameter: 11.04 km (6.86 mi)
- Depth: 2.04 km (1.27 mi)
- Colongitude: 346° at sunrise
- Eponym: John Dollond

Dollond is a small lunar impact crater that is located in the central region of the Moon, to the north of the crater Abulfeda. Due west of Dollond is Anděl. Dollond is circular and cone shaped, with a tiny floor at the midpoint of the sloping interior walls.

About 50 kilometers to the northeast of this crater was the landing site of the Apollo 16 mission, the next-to-last of the Apollo expeditions to the Moon.

This formation is named after British optician John Dollond (1706-1761). Its designation was formally adopted by the International Astronomical Union in 1935.

== Satellite craters ==
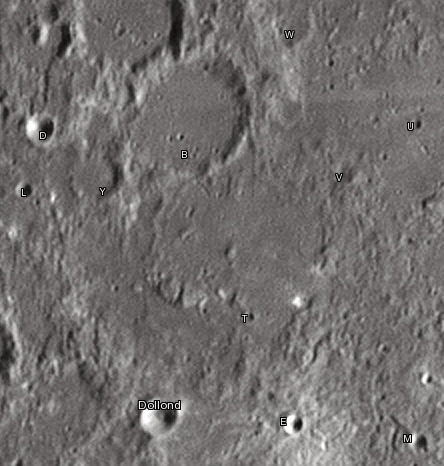
Dollond crater and its satellite features as seen from Earth

By convention these features are identified on lunar maps by placing the letter on the side of the crater midpoint that is closest to Dollond.

| Dollond | Latitude | Longitude | Diameter |
|---|---|---|---|
| B | 7.7° S | 13.8° E | 37 km |
| D | 8.2° S | 12.5° E | 9 km |
| E | 10.2° S | 15.7° E | 6 km |
| L | 8.7° S | 12.5° E | 5 km |
| M | 10.1° S | 16.9° E | 6 km |
| T | 9.4° S | 15.0° E | 3 km |
| U | 7.3° S | 16.0° E | 3 km |
| V | 7.9° S | 15.5° E | 6 km |
| W | 6.7° S | 14.6° E | 11 km |
| Y | 8.4° S | 13.2° E | 14 km |

The following crater has been renamed by the IAU.

- Dolland C — See Lindsay.

Dollond E is a fresh, bowl-shaped crater to the west of Mare Nectaris. Dollond T is the closest named feature to the Apollo 16 landing site, other than the features that were named by the astronauts (such as North Ray and South Ray craters).

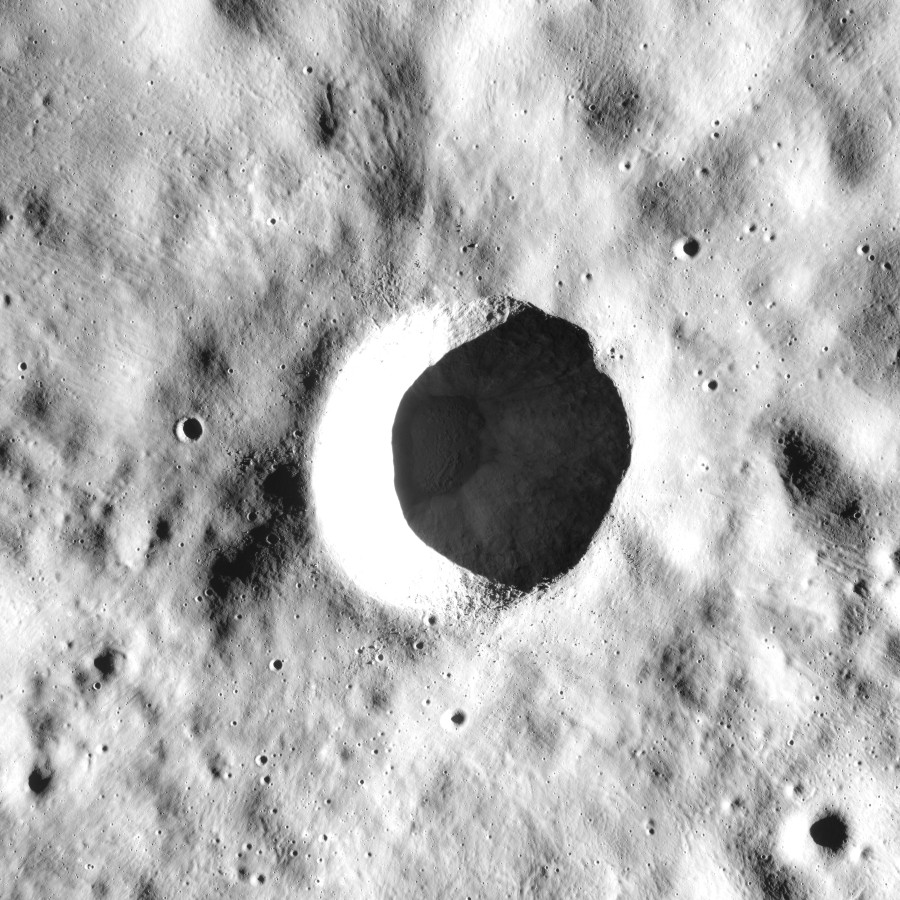
Dollond E

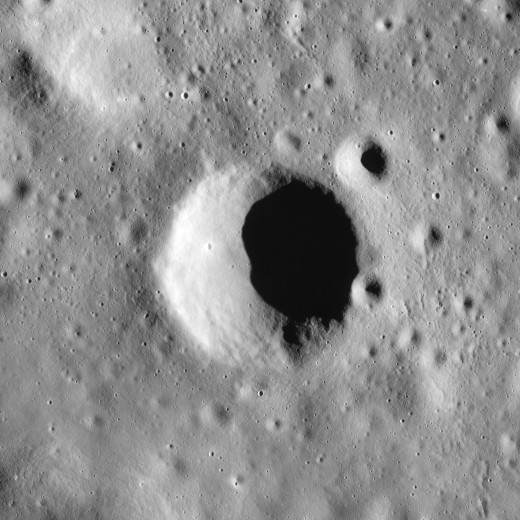
Dollond T
