= List of protected heritage sites in Libin =

This table shows an overview of the protected heritage sites in the Walloon town Libin. This list is part of Belgium's national heritage.

Object	Year/architect	Town/section	Address	Coordinates	Number^{?}	Image
Chapel Notre-Dame de Walcourt and the ensemble of the chapel and its surroundings, including oak trees, ash tree, the lime and the cedar wood ^{(nl)} ^{(fr)}		Libin		49.993731°N 5.153296°E	84035-CLT-0002-01 Info	Kapel Notre-Dame de Walcourt en het ensemble van de kapel en diens omgeving, waaronder de eik, de es, de lindes en het voorhangsel van cederhout More images
The Grand-Moulin of Villance, specifically: the facades and roofs of the main building including the mill and the mill building, the interior of machinery, and the interior of the shed. The land portion of the property include the pond ^{(nl)} ^{(fr)}		Libin		49.963389°N 5.201919°E	84035-CLT-0004-01 Info	De Grand-Moulin van Villance, specifiek: de gevels en daken van het hoofdgebouw met inbegrip van de molen en het molengebouw, het interieur van machines, het interieur van de schuur. De terreinen deel van het onroerend goed omvatten de vijver en ervoor. More images
Marie-Thérèse bridge west of the mill of Wes-el-Vaux and the ensemble of the bridge and its surroundings ^{(nl)} ^{(fr)}		Libin		49.973953°N 5.188851°E	84035-CLT-0006-01 Info	Brug Marie-Thérèse ten westen van de molen van Wes-el-Vaux en het ensemble van de brug en diens omgeving More images
Pont de la Justice or "Pont Vieux" and the ensemble of the bridge and its surroundings ^{(nl)} ^{(fr)}		Libin		49.966404°N 5.193831°E	84035-CLT-0007-01 Info	Pont de la Justice of "Vieux Pont" en het ensemble van de brug en diens omgeving More images

== See also ==
- List of protected heritage sites in Luxembourg (Belgium)
