= Redu =

Village in Luxembourg, Belgium

Coordinates: 50°00′N 5°10′E

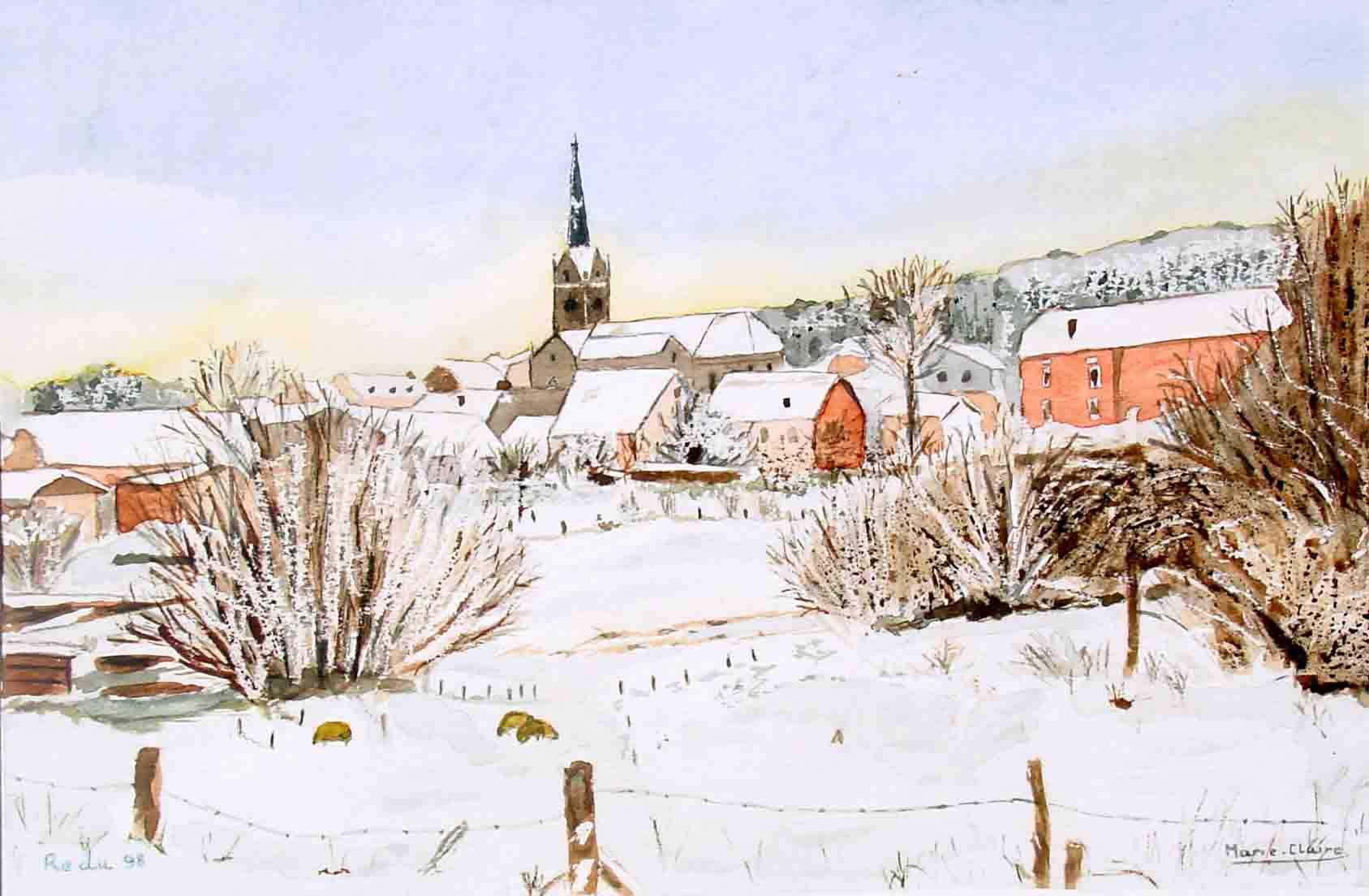
Painting of the village in the winter.

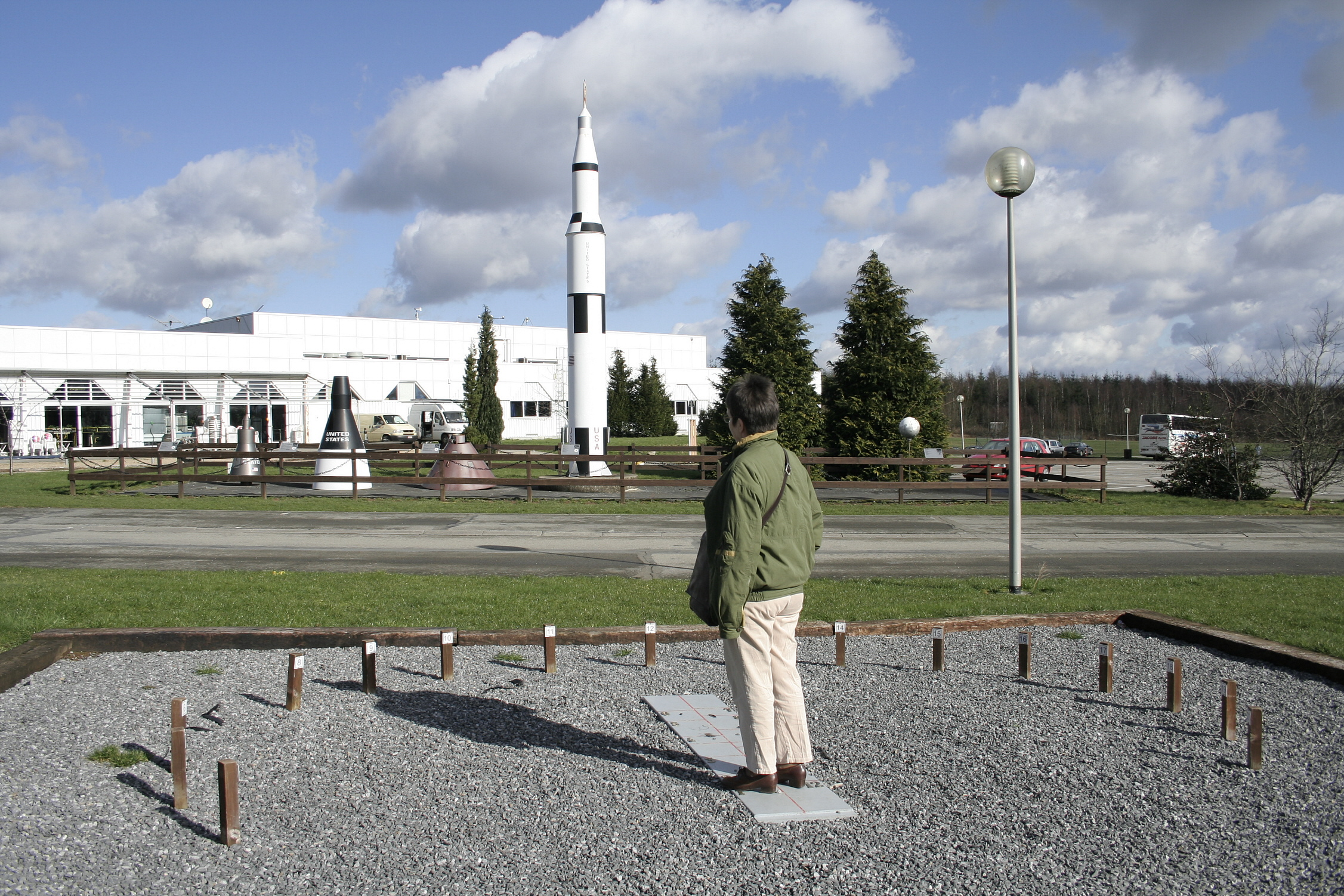
The Euro Space Center.

Redu (Walloon: Ridû) is a village of Wallonia and district of the municipality of Libin, located in the province of Luxembourg, Belgium.

The village is twinned with Hay-on-Wye in the United Kingdom and was one of the first book towns. The village was given new life by the development of the book trade in the 1980s but now faces an uncertain future with the decline in the brick-and-mortar book stores. Several of the book shops have closed and most of the others are having trouble.

The ESTRACK Redu Station for the European Space Agency is located about a kilometre away.

It has also a theme park in the nearby village of Transinne, one of the few in Europe devoted to space and astronautics, Euro Space Center.
