= Eric Mervyn Lindsay =

Irish astronomer

Eric Mervyn Lindsay FRAS (26 January 1907 – 27 July 1974) was an Irish astronomer.

He was born at The Grange near Portadown, County Armagh to Richard and Susan Lindsay. He was educated in Dublin at the King's Hospital School, then attended Queen's University, Belfast where he earned his BSc in 1928 and a MSc in 1929. He later went to Harvard University and was awarded a PhD in 1934.

He then went to South Africa for a post-graduate astronomy studies, and on 20 May 1935 was married to Sylvia Mussells in Cape Town. He returned to Ireland in 1937 to become director of the Armagh Observatory. He remained the director of the observatory until his death of a sudden heart attack in 1974.

He is more noted for his political influence in favour of astronomy than for important astronomical discoveries. For example, he was responsible for persuading the Irish government and Harvard University to found a telescope at Boyden Station in South Africa for the purpose of charting the southern skies. Dr. Lindsay was also instrumental in the founding of Armagh Planetarium.

Lindsay and his wife Sylvia had one son, Derek Michael Lindsay, who was born in 1944. Derek became a professor of chemistry in New York City, and died six months before his Mother Sylvia in 1999.

== Awards and honours ==
- The Most Excellent Order of the British Empire, 1963.
- Member of the Royal Irish Academy, 1939.
- The crater Lindsay on the Moon is named after him.
