= Armagh Planetarium =

Planetarium in Armagh, Northern Ireland

Coordinates: 54.352°N 6.649°W

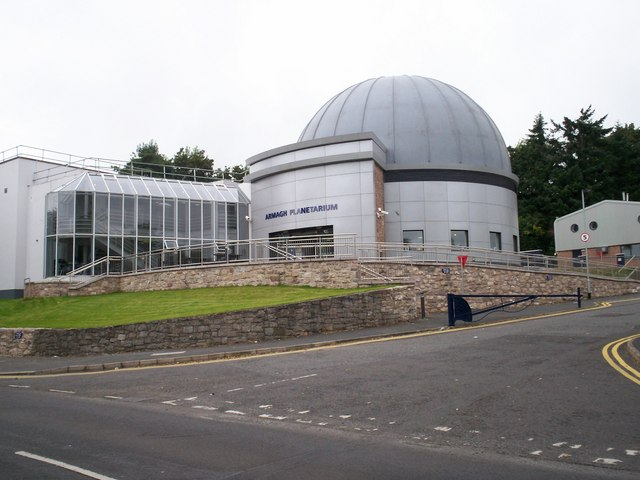
Armagh Planetarium

Armagh Planetarium is a planetarium in Armagh, Northern Ireland. It is located close to the city centre and neighbouring Armagh Observatory in approximately fourteen acres of landscaped grounds known as the Armagh Astropark.

== History ==
Armagh Planetarium was established by the seventh director of Armagh Observatory, Dr. Eric Mervyn Lindsay, who, after twenty-five years of effort, secured funding from local councils and the Ministry of Commerce of Northern Ireland in 1965. In the same year, Patrick Moore was appointed as director of the planetarium to oversee its construction. The planetarium cost £120,000 to build (included in this was £12,000 for the planetarium's first projector) and was officially opened on 1 May 1968, although it had been open to the public for some months before that. Since then it has undergone a number of alterations: the main building was extended in 1974 to incorporate the Lindsay Hall of astronomy, and a dome was created to house a 16 in (410 mm) reflecting telescope for public use, currently the largest public telescope in Ireland. In addition, in 1994 a new exhibition hall, the Eartharium, was added due to increased interest in Earth Science. The Armagh Astropark, which opened in 1994, is a scale model of the Solar System and the universe contained in the grounds of the Armagh Observatory, with scale-sized stainless steel models of the Sun and planets.

The planetarium, which was founded in 1968, it celebrated its 50th anniversary in 2018.

== Technology ==
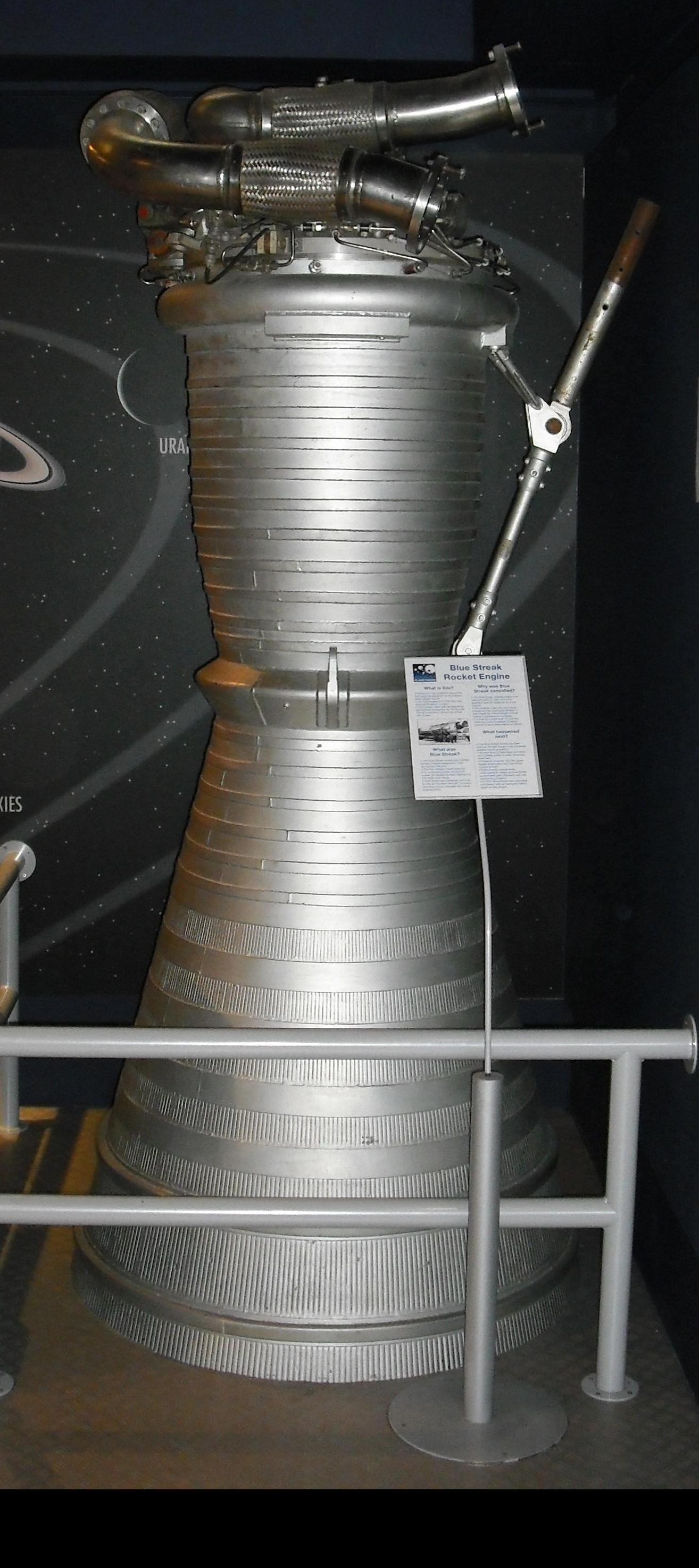
Rolls-Royce rocket engine exhibit

Under the directorship of Terence Murtagh in the 1970s, Armagh Planetarium introduced several new technologies. Murtagh recognised the possibility of exploiting the new technology of video projectors to provide the show's special effects, eliminating the need for dozens of slide projectors. Video tape recorders were new and rare at this time and this research was ambitious with many technical hurdles standing in the way. Off-the-shelf video projectors had to be optically and electronically modified to present natural-looking images of celestial bodies on the dome. The system he introduced remained in place until computer controlled laserdisc players replaced the videotape players in the 1980s. This development meant that Armagh Planetarium was the first planetarium in the world to project video on its dome. Other planetaria around the world followed this lead.

Armagh Planetarium also pioneered the introduction of an electronic audience participation system. This allowed the audience to control the show themselves. Each seat was fitted with a small keypad, using this device the audience could use their buttons to respond to multiple-choice quizzes in the show, be polled on their preferences and even steer the direction of the show by selecting the topics. Space Odyssey, created in Armagh in the 1980s and scripted by Ian Ridpath, was the world's first ever completely interactive planetarium show. This innovation has also since spread to other planetaria.

== Refurbishment ==
Before reopening on 31 July 2006, Armagh Planetarium underwent a major refurbishment. The building was totally refurbished to make it "more comfortable and environmentally friendly". These improvements saw the complete rebuilding of the digital theatre to accommodate 93 visitors and the installation of a new Bose Corporation stereo sound system, an updated LED lighting suite and a Digistar 3 fulldome video projection system.

Armagh Planetarium maintains an outreach programme. Planetarium staff travel to venues such as schools and science festivals to deliver presentations on astronomy and other sciences. A thirty-seat inflatable planetarium is used for most of these visits.

On 7 December 2006, the Armagh Planetarium building was dedicated to the memory of Eric Lindsay in a ceremony led by Archbishop Robin Eames.

== Projectors ==
Armagh Planetarium has used a series of projectors of increasing sophistication and capability. The first projector was the Goto Mars (1968–1977). It included individual lamps to project images of the Sun, Moon and planets. This was followed by a Viewlex-Minolta Roman IIb (1977–1994), which is still in use in its current home at South Downs Planetarium in England. The first digital projector installed in Armagh was an Evans and Sutherland Digistar 1 (1994–1995). Armagh was the first planetarium in the UK to use this new technology but it was soon replaced by the more advanced Digistar 2 (1995–2006). The latest Digistar 7 is a "state-of-the-art" computer system projecting full-colour fulldome video across the entire dome.

== List of directors ==
Directors of Armagh Planetarium
Patrick Moore	1965–1968
Thomas Rackham	1968–1971
Terence Murtagh	1971–1989
Ian Griffin	1990–1995
Tom Mason	1996–2015

Directors of Armagh Observatory and Planetarium
Michael G. Burton	2016 –

== See also ==
- List of science centers#Europe
