= Libin, Belgium =

Municipality in Wallonia, Belgium

Libin
- Municipality
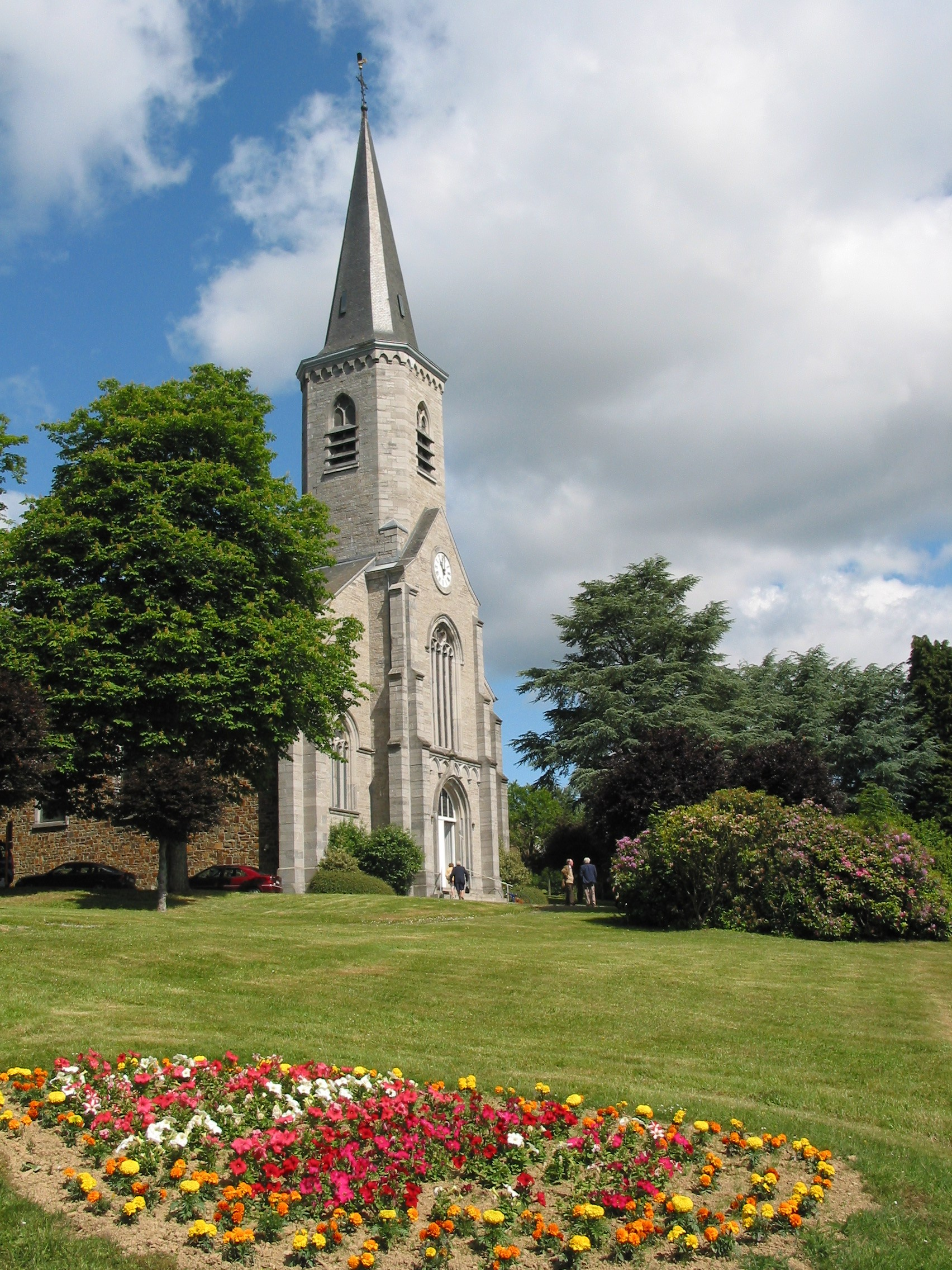
- Libin: the church of Our Lady of Mount Carmel

- Flag Coat of arms

- Location of Libin in Luxembourg province
- Interactive map of Libin
- Location in Belgium
- Coordinates: 49°59′N 05°15′E
- Country: Belgium
- Community: French Community
- Region: Wallonia
- Province: Luxembourg
- Arrondissement: Neufchâteau

Government
  - Mayor: Anne Laffut
  - Governing party: HORIZON 2024

Area
  - Total: 140.58 km^{2} (54.28 sq mi)

Population (2018-01-01)
  - Total: 5,164
  - Density: 36.73/km^{2} (95.14/sq mi)
- Postal codes: 6890
- NIS code: 84035
- Area codes: 061
- Website: www.libin.be

Libin (French pronunciation: [libɛ̃]) is a municipality of Wallonia located in the province of Luxembourg, Belgium.

On 1 January 2019 the municipality, which covers 140.5 km^{2}, had 5,223 inhabitants, giving a population density of 37.2 inhabitants per km^{2}.

The municipality consists of the following districts: Anloy, Libin, Ochamps, Redu, Smuid, Transinne, and Villance. Other population centers include: Glaireuse, Hamaide, Lesse, Libin-Bas, Libin-Haut, and Sèchery.

Redu is famous for its bookshops, and for hosting a large European Space Agency ground station. Also in the municipality is the Euro Space Center tourist attraction, close to Transinne. Sèchery is known as a popular location for marriages and company seminars (e.g. Antwerp Management School,...).

== See also ==
- List of protected heritage sites in Libin
