= Transinne =

Village of Wallonia in Belgium

Coordinates: 50°00′N 5°12′E

Transinne (Walloon: Transene) is a village of Wallonia and a district of the municipality of Libin, located in the province of Luxembourg, Belgium.

It is home to the Euro Space Centre. There is also a theme park in the village.
