= Michael Burton (astronomer) =

Northern Irish astronomer

Michael G. Burton is an astronomer who is director of the Armagh Observatory and Planetarium. He was previously director of teaching at the School of Physics, University of New South Wales. He is a member of the International Astronomical Union.

Burton is Australian. He received his tertiary education at the University of Cambridge and at the University of Edinburgh.

Burton is a fellow of Astronomical Society of Australia (FASA), Australian Institute of Physics (FAIP), and the Royal Society of New South Wales (FRSN).
