= Euro Space Center =

Science museum and educational tourist attraction in Libin, Belgium

Coordinates: 50°00′30″N 5°13′10″E

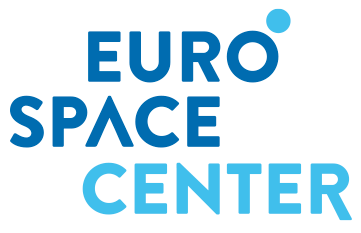
Logo of Euro Space Center.

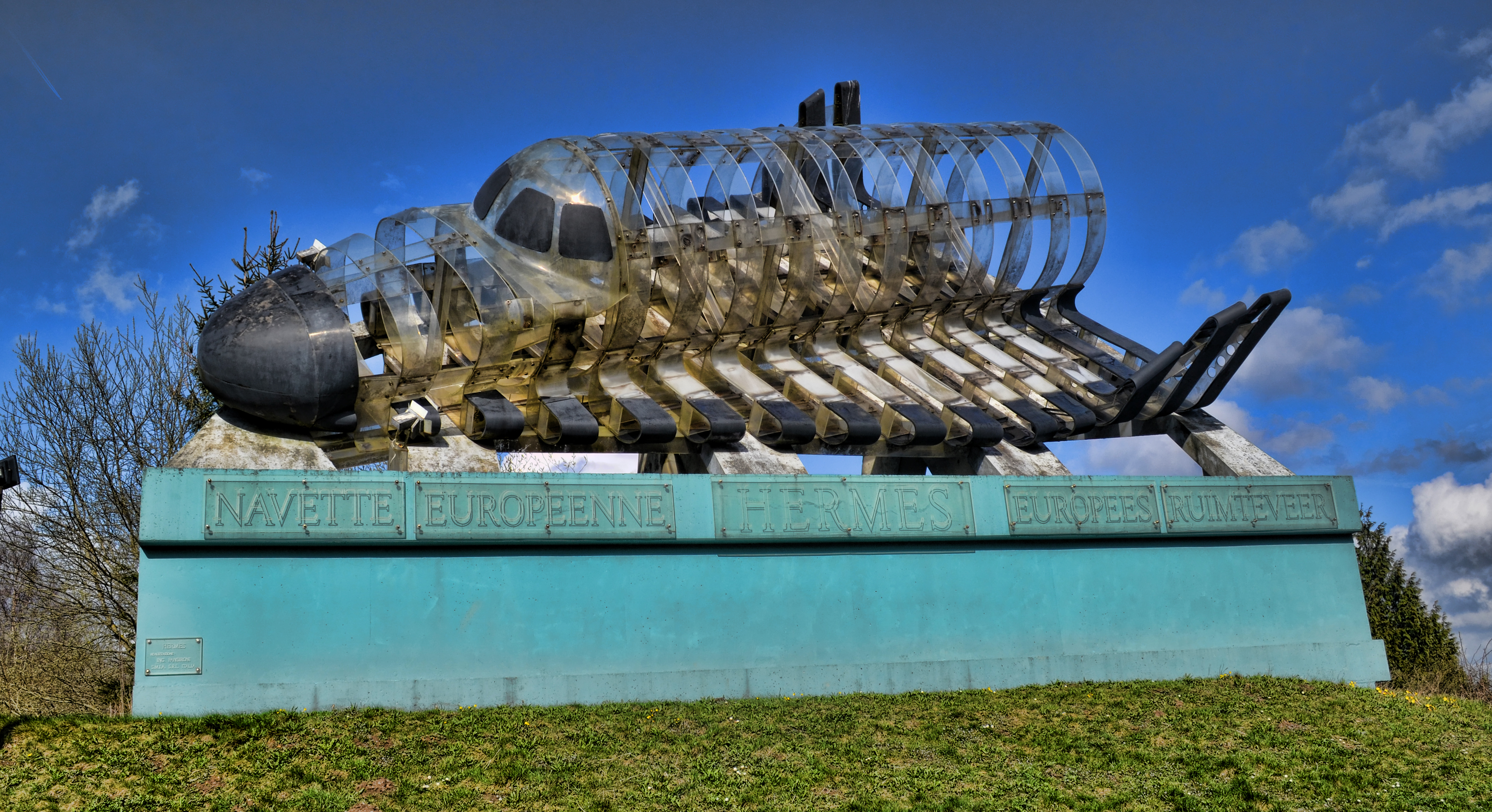
Monument at Euro Space Center in Redu (Belgium), depicting the proposed Hermes shuttle

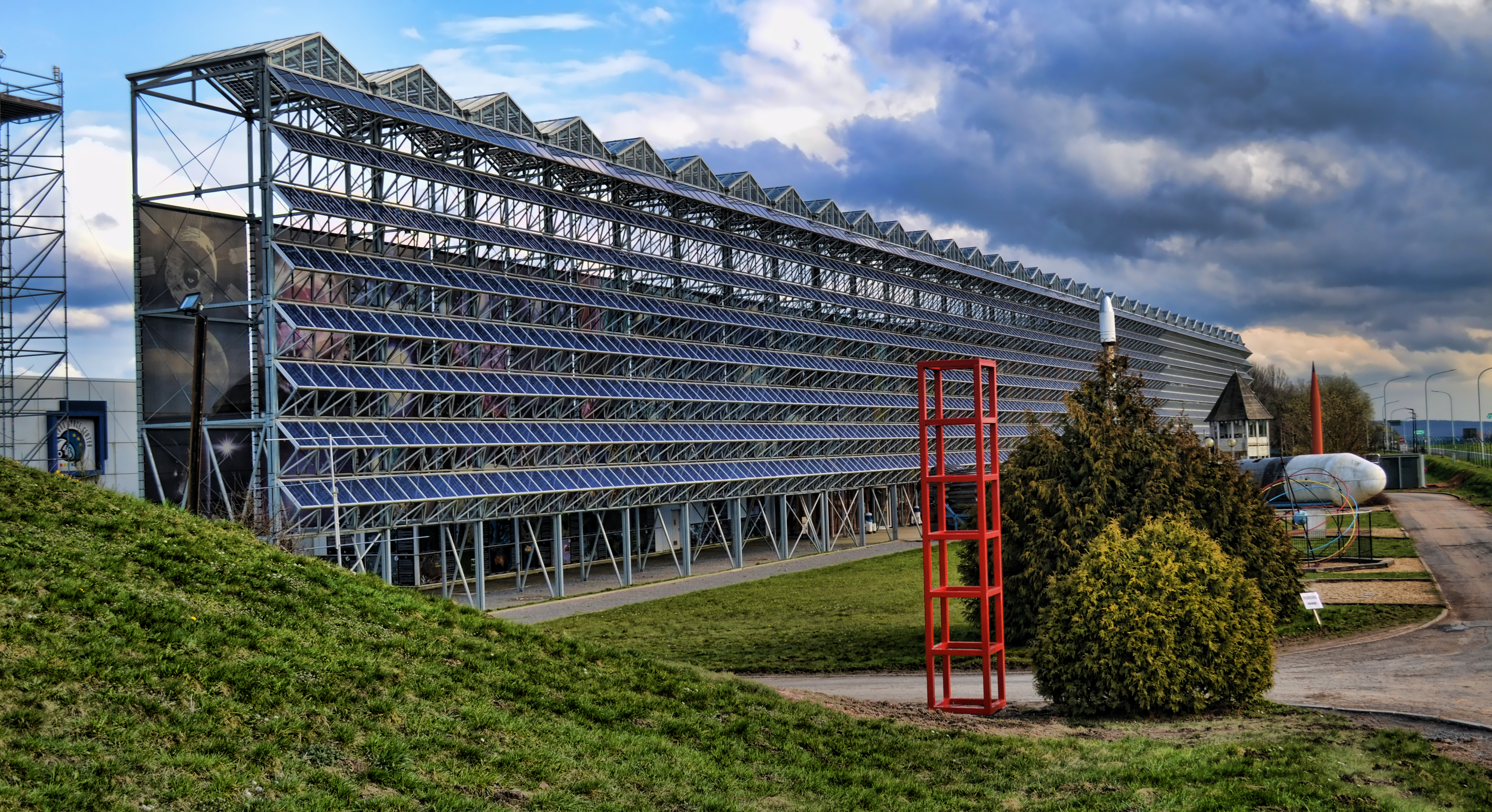
Main Building at Euro Space Center in Redu (Belgium)

Euro Space Center is a science museum and educational tourist attraction located in Wallonia in the village of Transinne, municipality of Libin, Belgium. It is devoted to space science and astronautics.

The centre includes simulators of space flight and micro-gravity. It is the home of the only full-scale mock-up of a U.S. Space Shuttle existing in Europe, named Amicitia.

== Gallery ==
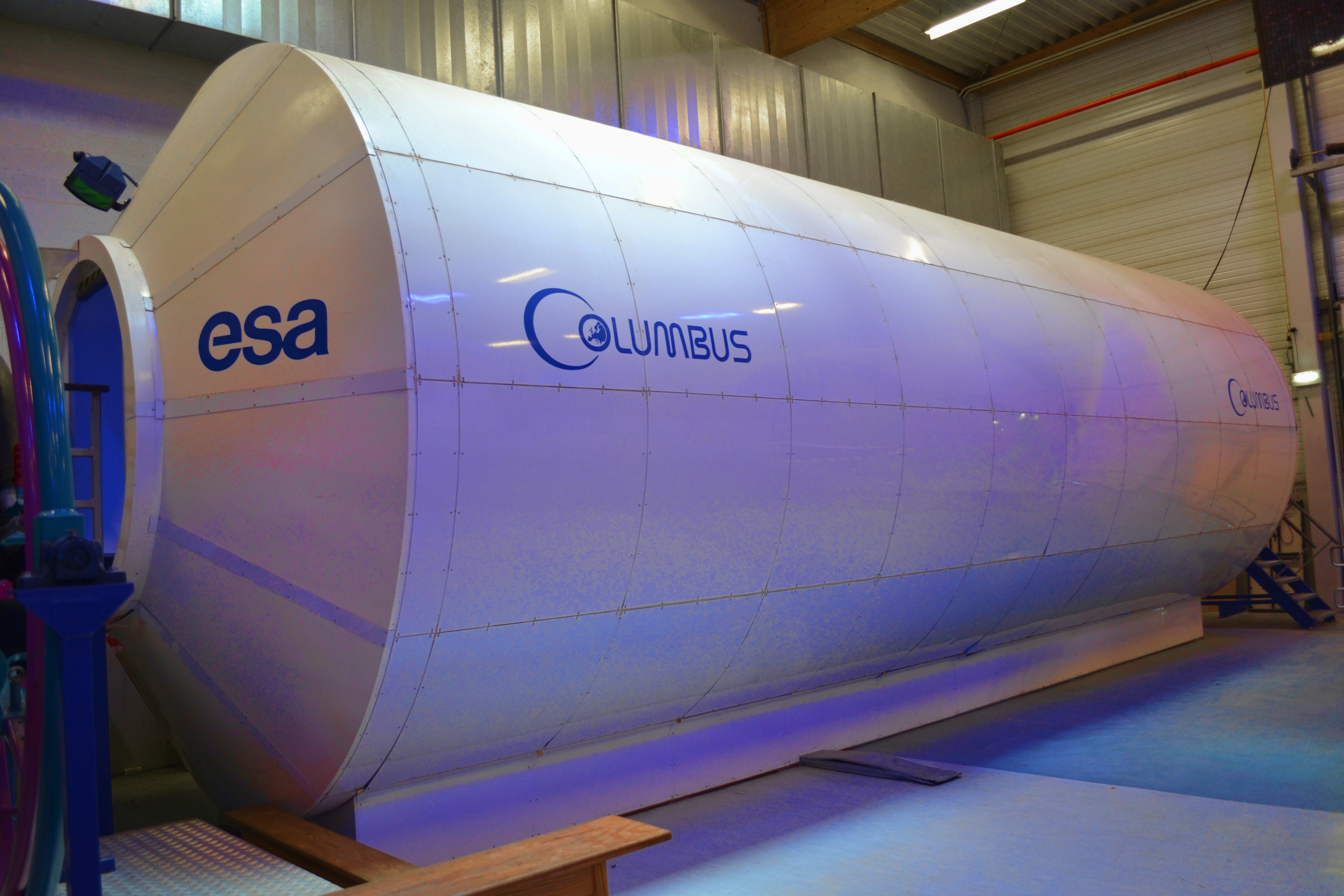
Life size replica of the European Columbus space laboratory

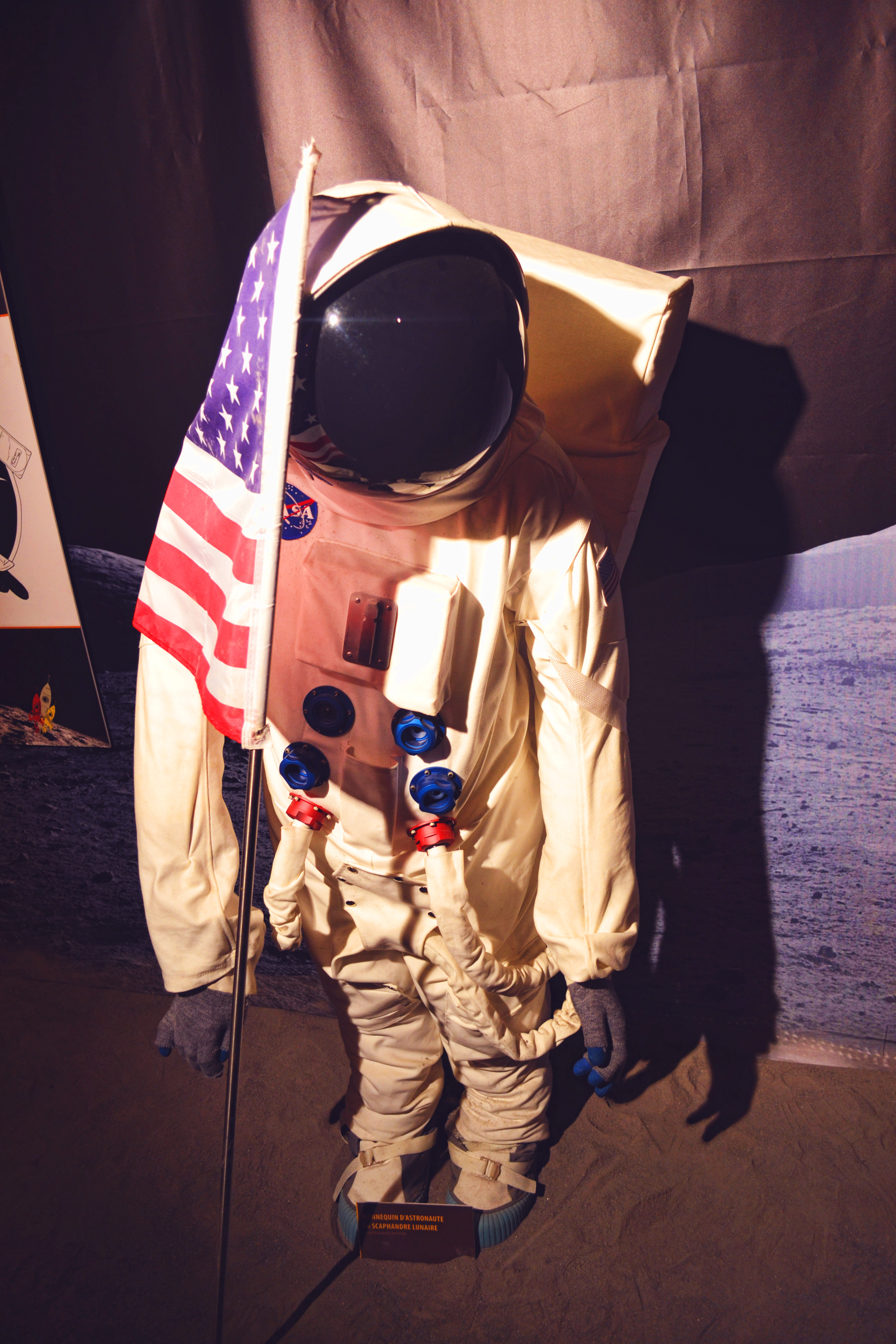
EVA and Moon suit Replica

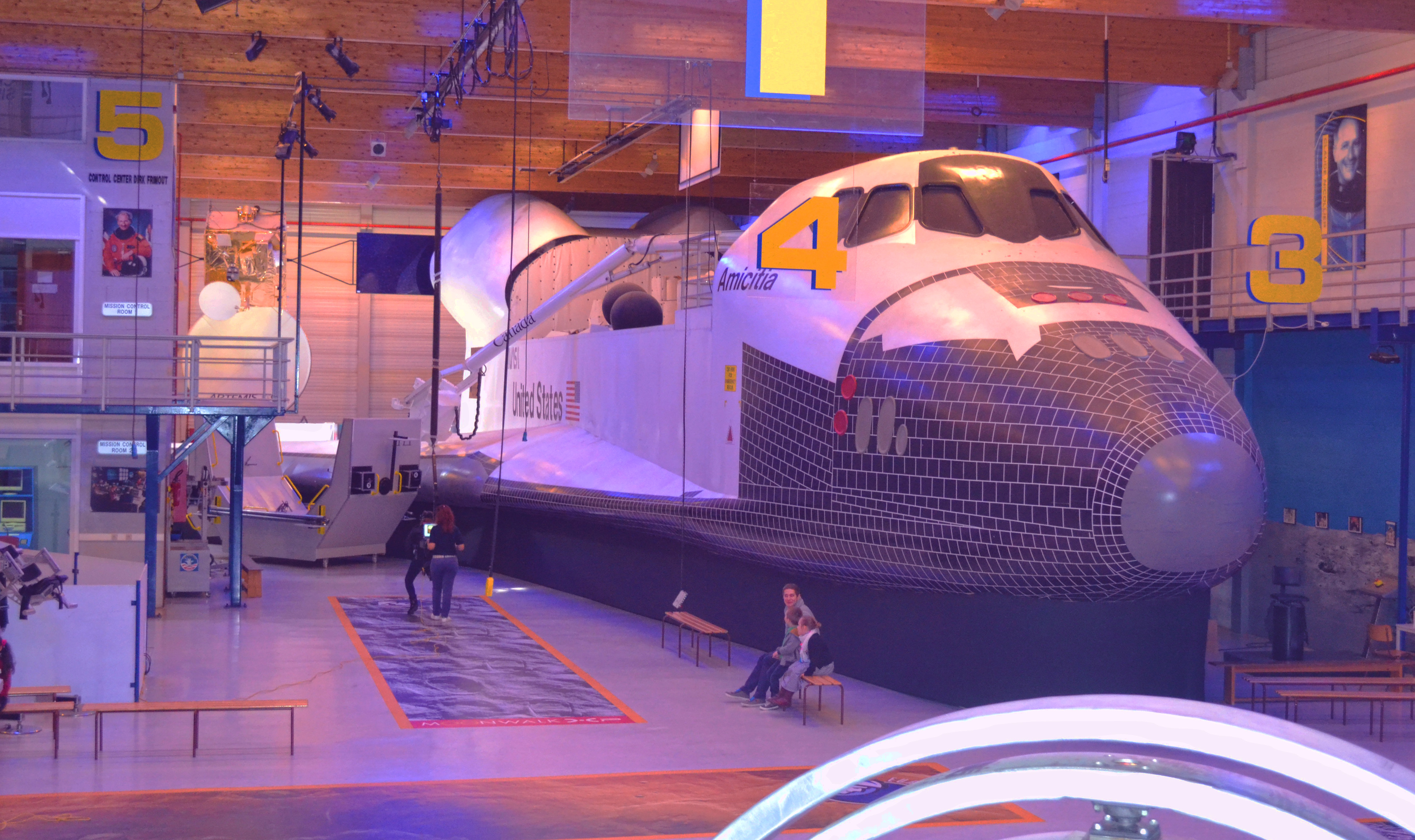
Life size replica of the NASA Space Shuttle

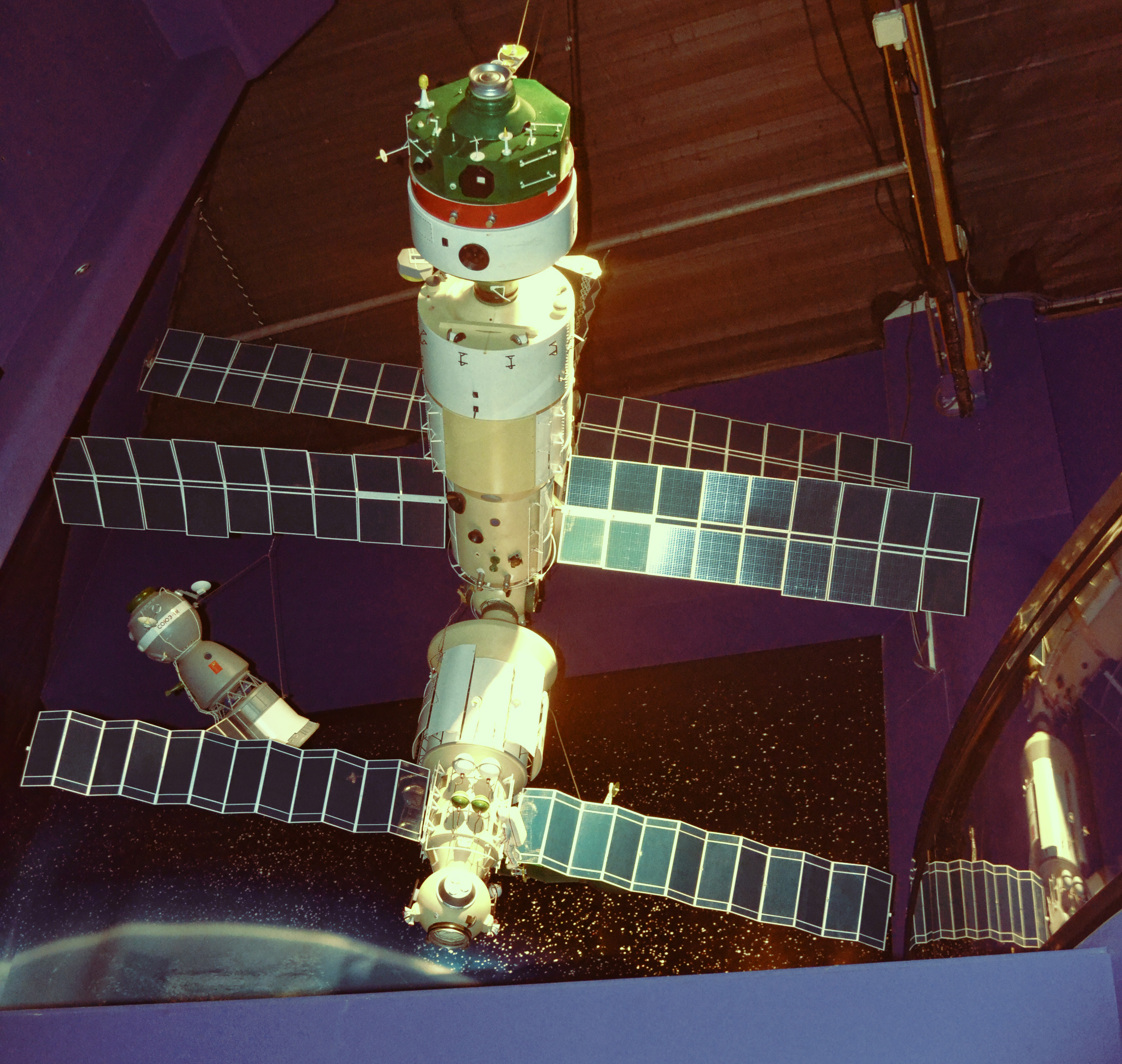
Scale model of the MIR Space Station

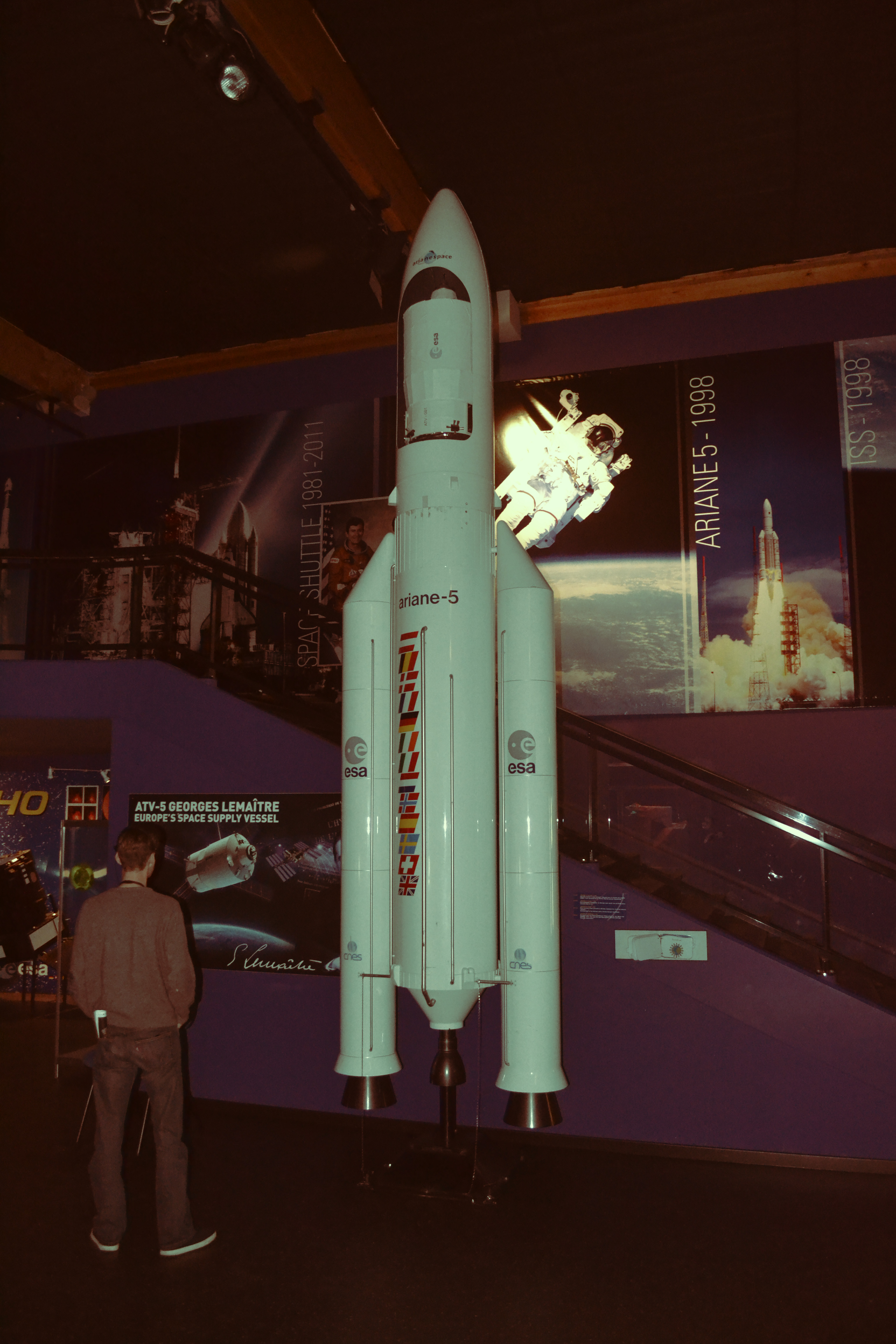
Scale model replica of the Ariane 5 European heavy-lift launch vehicle

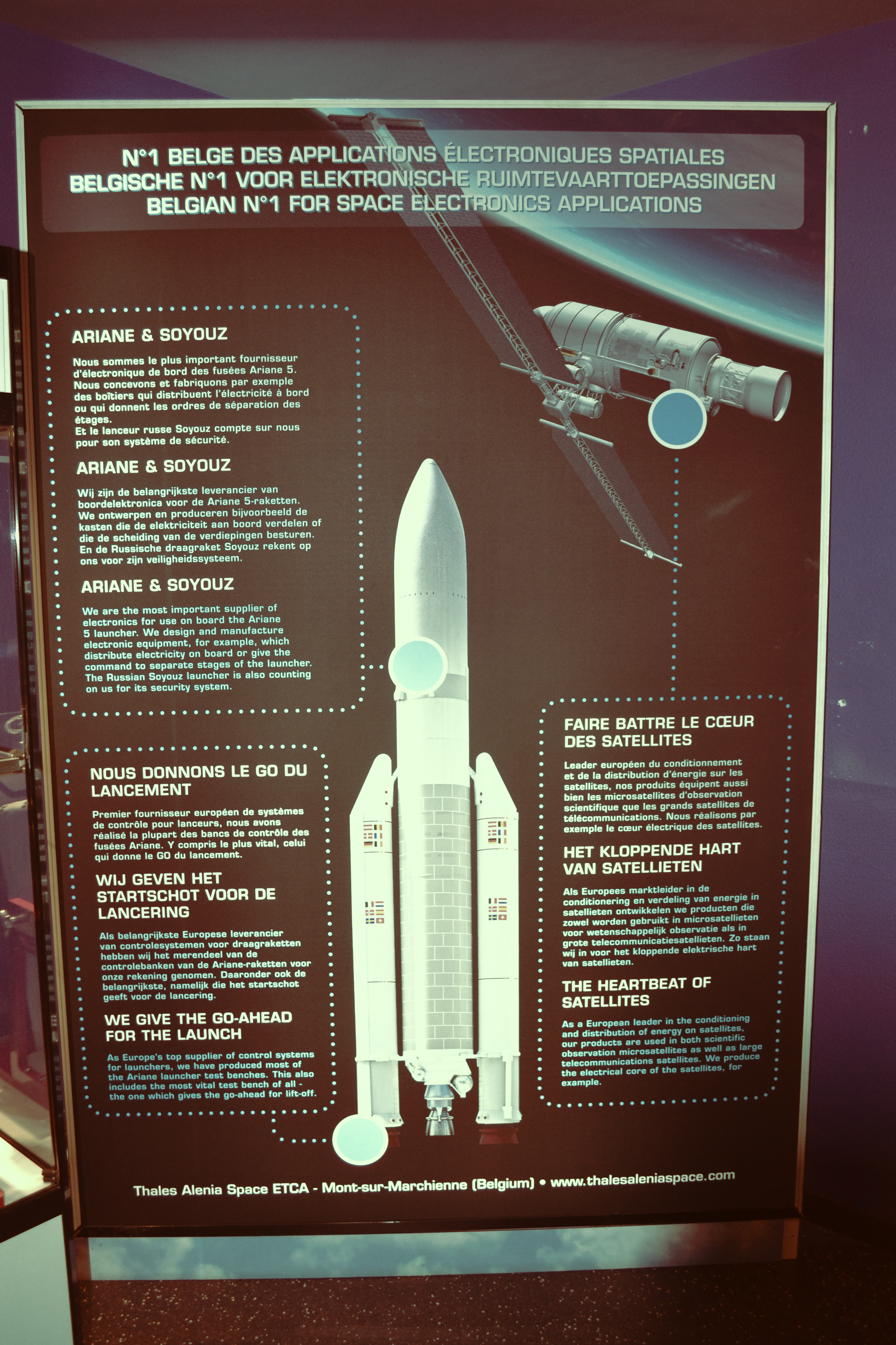
Belgian components for the Ariane 5 rocket

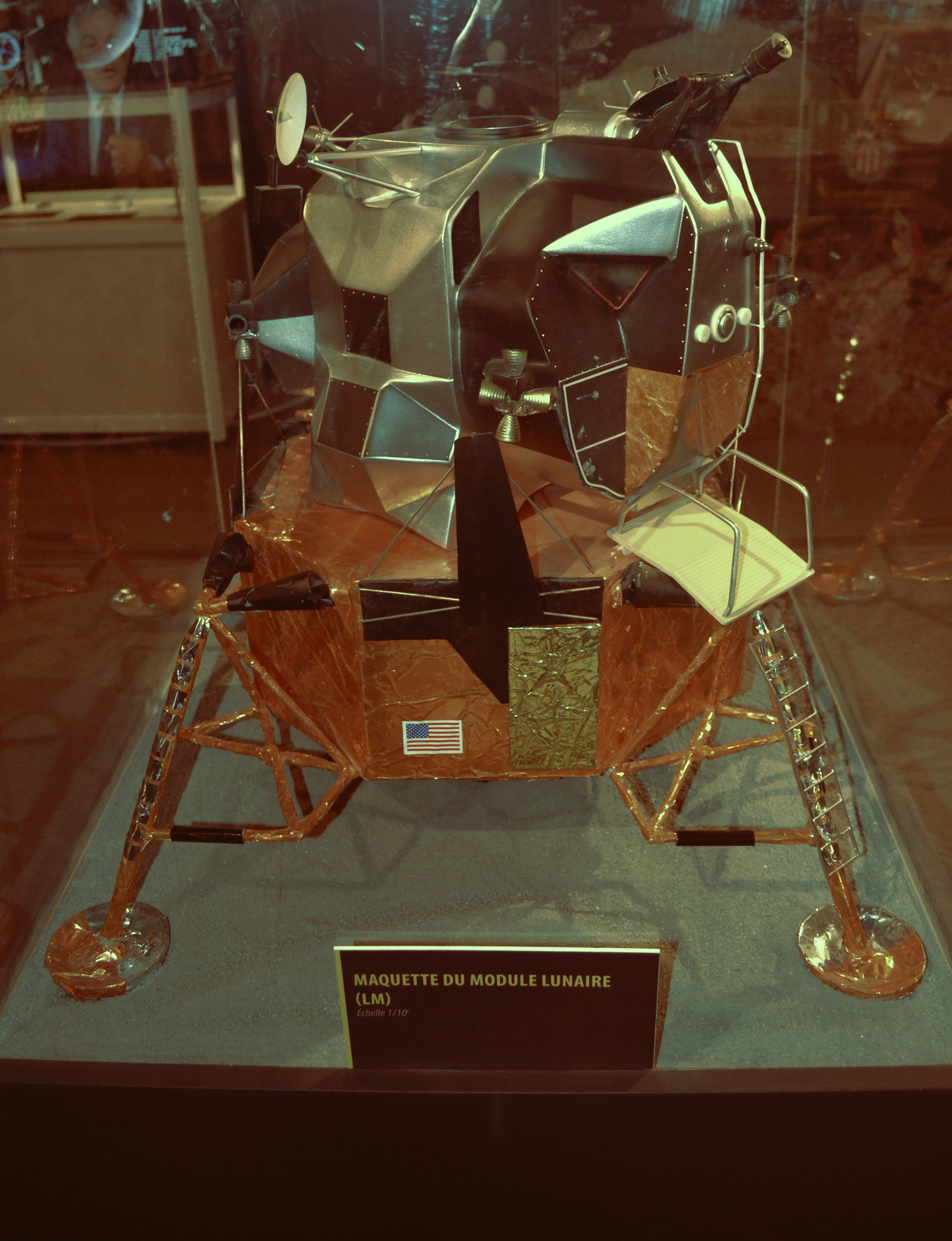
Scale model of Apollo Lunar Module

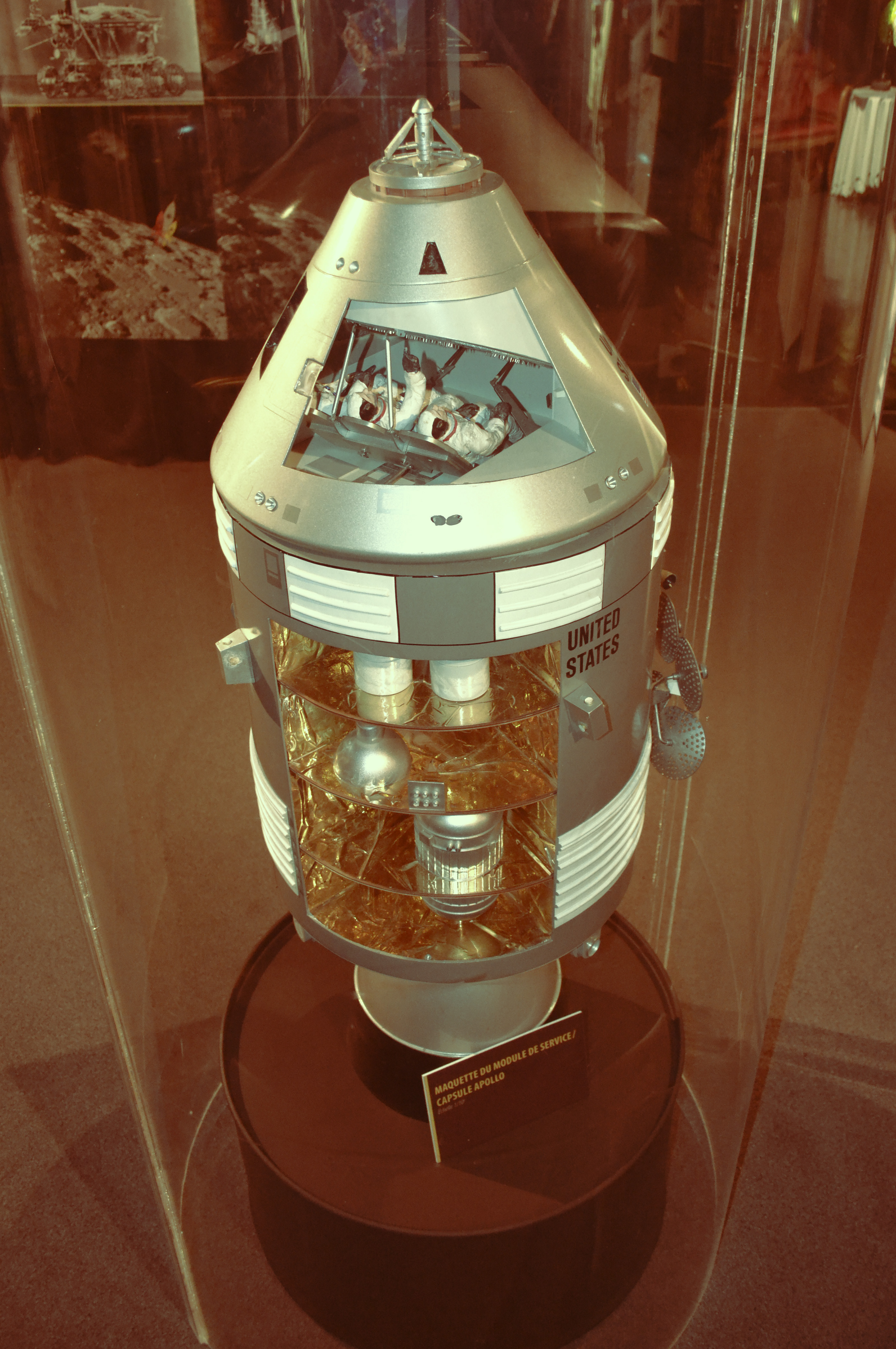
Scale model of Apollo Command and Service Module

== See also ==
- Belgian Federal Science Policy Office (BELSPO)
- Belgian Institute for Space Aeronomy
- European Space Agency
- Space Center
