= Cora (rocket) =

French experimental rocket

- Cora rocket diagram

Size
- Height: 11.5 m
- Diameter: 2.01 m
- Mass: 16.5 tonnes
- Stages: 2

Launch history
- Status: Retired

First stage – Coralie
- Height: 5.5 m
- Diameter: 2.01 m
- Gross mass: 9.85 tonnes
- Powered by: 4 Vexin A
- Maximum thrust: 220 kN
- Specific impulse: 280 s
- Propellant: UDMH / N_{2}O_{4}

Second stage – Astris
- Height: 3.36 m (11.0 ft)
- Diameter: 2 m (79 in)
- Empty mass: 610 kg (1,340 lb)
- Gross mass: 3,370 kg (7,430 lb)
- Propellant mass: 2,760 kg (6,080 lb)
- Powered by: 1 Astris
- Maximum thrust: 23.3 kN (5,200 lb_{f})
- Specific impulse: 310 s
- Burn time: 330 s
- Propellant: Aerozine 50 / N_{2}O_{4}

Cora was a French experimental rocket. It was the largest rocket ever launched in Western Europe. It was primarily used for testing the second (Coralie) and third stages (Astris) of the multinational Europa Rocket, which was developed and produced by the European Launcher Development Organisation, the predecessor to the present day European Space Agency.

For the Cora 1 only the French Coralie first stage was active. For the Cora 2 version the second German Astris stage was active. The Italian made Europa nose fairing was also tested.

== Configuration ==
The entire rocket had a length of 11.5 metres, a diameter of 2.01 m and a takeoff weight of 16.5 tonnes. Total thrust was 220.00 kN, with the rocket capable of reaching an apogee of 55 km.

The Coralie first stage was 5.5 metres long and had a diameter of 2 metres; when fully fuelled, it weighed 9.85 tonnes; the propellant was a mixture of nitrogen tetroxide and unsymmetrical dimethylhydrazine (UDMH). It was powered by a four-nozzle engine that produced 220 KN of thrust and had a specific impulse (in vacuum) of 280 seconds. A cylindrical black ring supporting four fins was attached to the rocket's base.

The Astris second stage was 3.36 meters long with a diameter of 2 meters; when fully fuelled, it weighed 3.370 tonnes; the propellant was a mixture of nitrogen tetroxide and Aerozine-50. It was powered by an engine that produced 23.33 kN of thrust and had a specific impulse (in vacuum) of 310 seconds.

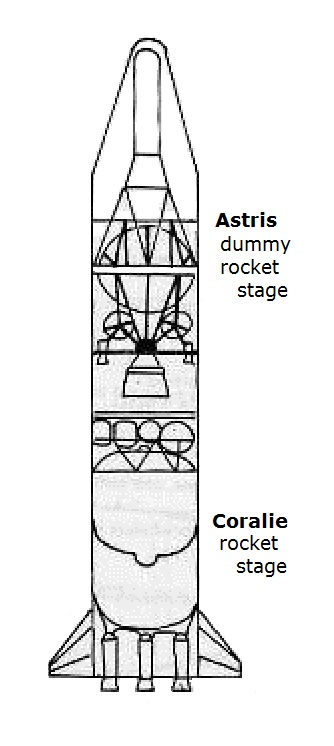
Cora 1 stages diagram

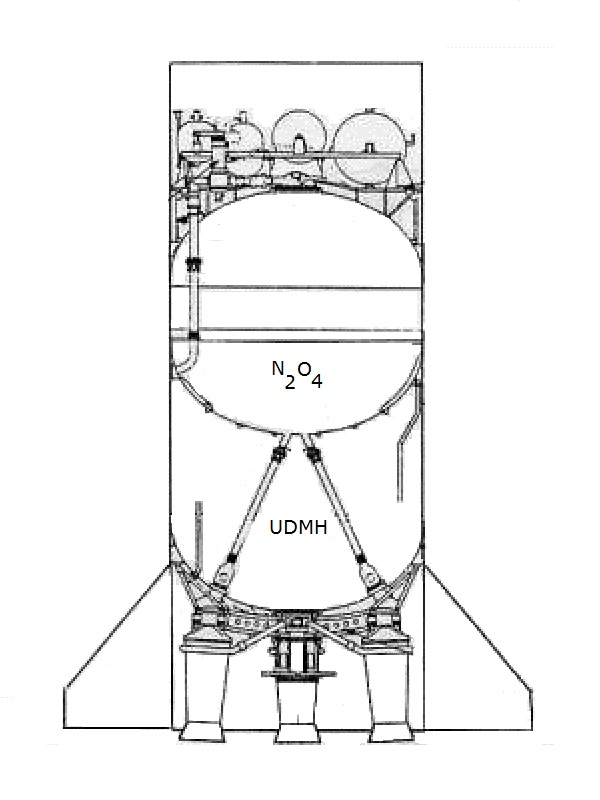
Coralie 1st stage diagram

== Launch history ==
Six Cora launches were planned, the first four using the Cora 1 configuration and the last two using the Cora 2. Only the three first launches took place, with the Cora 2 configuration never being tested:

- On 27 November 1966, a first launch was conducted at the CIEES missile range and launch facility at Hammaguir, French Algeria. Guidance was lost at T+62s, with the rocket reaching an apogee of 10 km. It was considered a half success.
- On 18 December 1966, a second launch took place. It reached an apogee of 55 km and was considered successful.
- On 25 October 1967, Core was launched from Biscarrosse, Nouvelle-Aquitaine. Reaching an apogee of 10 km if failed due to a cabling issue.

The following planned flights were cancelled and replaced by tests of the Europa rocket (Europa 1 F7, Europa 1 F6/1 and Europa 1 F6/2).

== See also ==
- Europa Rocket
