= Black Prince (rocket) =

Proposed British-led satellite expendable launch system

Black Prince was a proposed British-led satellite expendable launch system. It would have made heavy use of the preceding Blue Streak missile and the Black Knight test rocket development programmes, as well as some new elements, to produce a British-built launcher capable of deploying medium-sized payloads into orbit. Popularly known as the Black Prince due to its assigned rainbow code, in official documentation, the platform was referred to as the Blue Streak Satellite Launch Vehicle (BSSLV).

The Black Prince originated from various ballistic missile programmes that were being conducted by the United Kingdom during the 1950s. As envisioned, it was to have been a multistage rocket, the first stage being the Blue Streak and the second stage being the Black Knight. This would have been mated to a variety of different interchangeable third stages, differing based upon the individual intended mission profile. According to performance projections, the Black Prince would have been capable of delivering a 960 kg (2,117 lb) payload to a 740 km (400 nmi) orbit.

The Black Prince gained several supporters, including official government backing following the termination of military involvement in the Blue Streak programme during early 1960. It was seen as a viable means of reusing existing development work, but one that would still involve significant costs. The British government promoted the concept to other potential partners across Europe and the Commonwealth of Nations, however it became clear that the necessary backing would not be forthcoming. Work on the Black Prince launcher came to an effective halt shortly after the formation of the European Launcher Development Organisation (ELDO) working group and a government decision to proceed with British participation in the multinational Europa launcher programme instead. During the late 1960s, it was proposed that elements of the Black Knight could be combined with the later Black Arrow launcher.

== Development ==
=== Background ===
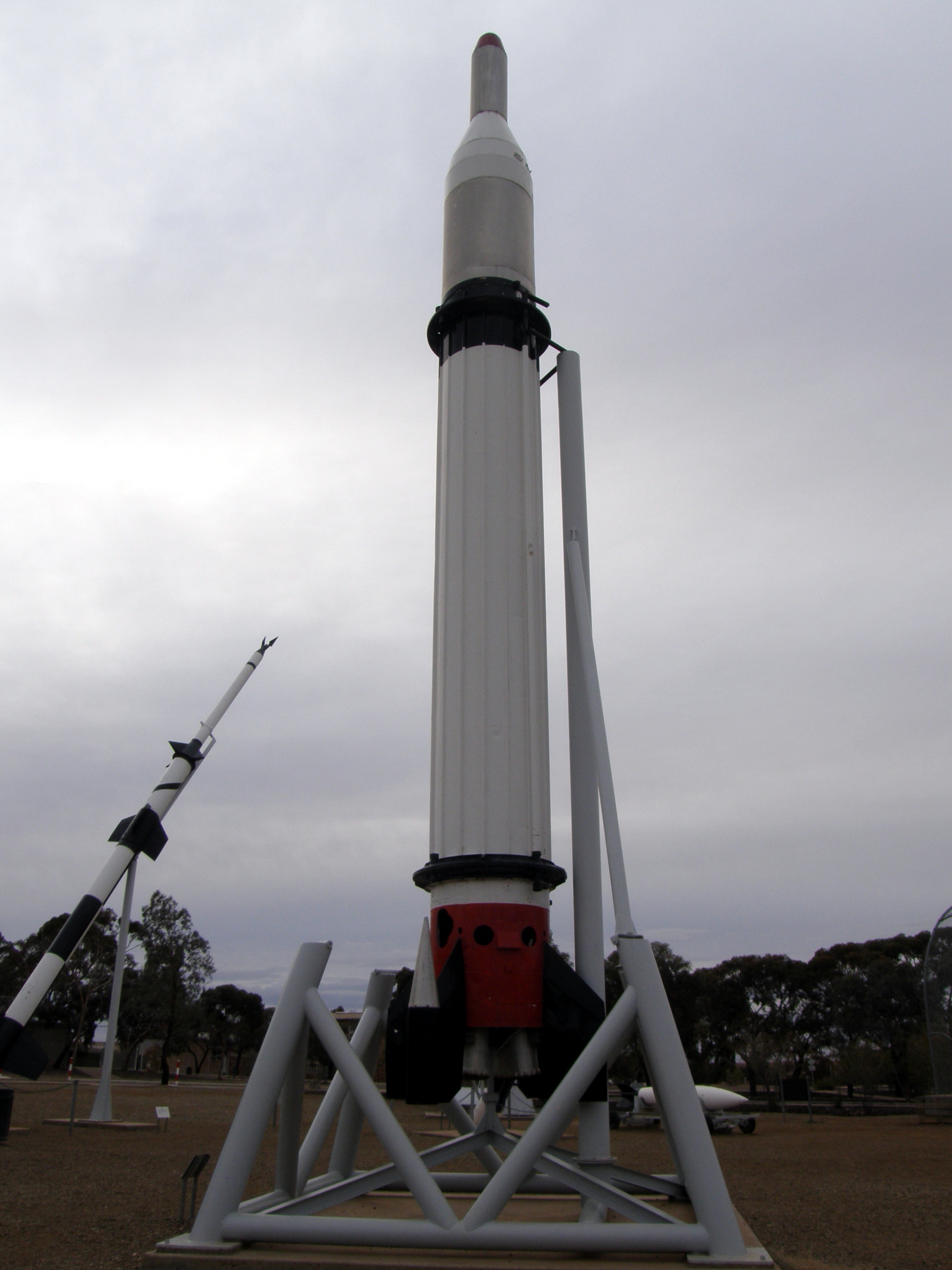
A Black Knight rocket – the intended second stage for the Black Prince launcher

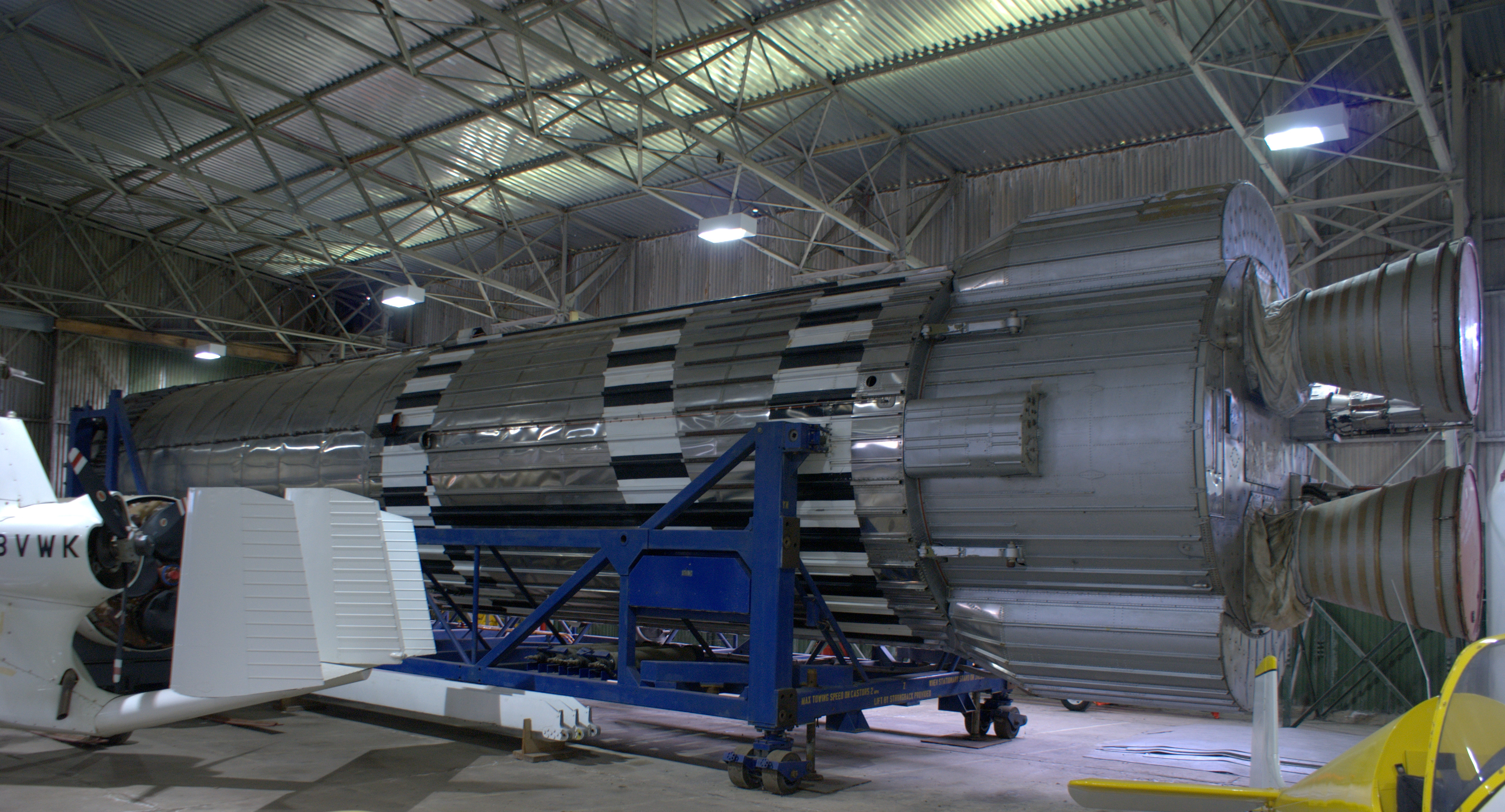
A preserved Blue Streak missile – the intended first stage for the Black Prince launcher

During the early 1950s, the British government had identified the need to develop its own series of ballistic missiles due to advances being made in this field, particularly by the Soviet Union and the United States. A British programme to develop such a missile, named Blue Streak, was promptly initiated; however, there were key questions over the then-relatively unknown scenario of what such a vehicle would encounter when attempting re-entry to the atmosphere, there were fears that such a vehicle might simply burn up like a meteor and therefore be unachievable.

At the same time, Britain had also never previously developed a ballistic missile before, the field being relatively new and with few participants, thus there was significant value in developing and constructing a research ballistic missile in order to gain experience and data on how to design and build such vehicles, develop launch techniques, and general handling. Accordingly, during 1955, the Black Knight research rocket programme was commenced for this purpose. Following several launches, the Black Knight came to be regarded as a successful programme, having produced a relatively low cost and reliable rocket, and thus there was impetus present to proceed with further development of the platform.

The Black Prince itself has its origins in a proposed design that was put forward by Desmond King-Hele and Doreen Gilmour of the Royal Aircraft Establishment (RAE) during 1957. As envisioned by this proposal, an expendable launch system could be developed using a mix of preexisting and in-development assets; the multi-stage launcher was to be formed of a Blue Streak first stage, a Black Knight (or Black Arrow) second stage, and a military solid rocket as a third stage. The proposal, which subsequently became widely known as the Black Prince, quickly attracted the attention of a key supporter in Dr Geoffrey Pardoe, the project manager for the Blue Streak missile programme.

=== Space launcher ===
On 13 April 1960, the Defence Minister Harold Watkinson announced the cancellation of Blue Streak as a military programme, and went on to state that: "the Government will now consider with the firms and other interests concerned, as a matter of urgency, whether the Blue Streak programme could be adapted for the development of a launcher for space satellites." While development of the Blue Streak missile continued with the view of using it as a capable satellite launcher, the rate of work was substantially slowed. Aerospace author C.N Hill wrote that this declaration had been made: "Mainly, I suspect, to minimise the political damage that ensued from the [Blue Streak] decision".

The 1957 concept design for a combined Blue Streak-Black Knight launcher was put forward once again, and this time received a favourable appraisal; the project was assigned the rainbow code of Black Prince. In official documentation, the platform was referred to as the Blue Streak Satellite Launch Vehicle (BSSLV). The development of Black Prince was driven by the conjunction of the RAE and two private firms, aerospace manufacturer Saunders Roe and engine firm Bristol Siddeley.

It was quickly recognised that the programme's cost would be a major issue, one estimate of the total development costs would have been equal of half of the Britain's university budget. At the same point, it was becoming clear that, due to British military satellites already being delivered by American launchers and the domestic science community being perceived as lacking the funding to conduct multiple major research satellite programmes at once, that domestic demand for such a launcher was not guaranteed. Accordingly, it was decided that it would be preferable for other nations to be involved in the programme in order to share the burden of the costs and to be predisposed to making use of the launcher.

The Black Prince programme underwent several major changes during development. In March 1961, the RAE informed Saunders Roe that it had decided to adopt a French-built second stage for the launcher in place of the Black Knight. During the mid-1960s, the deployment of some form of combination of the Black Knight with the later Black Arrow launcher was also under consideration.

=== Cancellation ===
By late 1960, it was clear that no British Government department was prepared to provide full financing for the programme, and that neither would any of Britain's allies across the Commonwealth of Nations be prepared to make major contributions in order to meet the shortfall. Most Commonwealth members either lacked the resources to spare in order to participate, or lacked interest in doing so. Canada was already overcommitted to its existing space-related scientific commitments, while Australia reportedly lacked interest in the programme beyond supporting operations at Woomera; accordingly, the prospects for a joint programme to develop and operate the Black Knight were very dim.

Britain had also made diplomatic approaches to various European nations, the most significant of these being to France. An overture to the French Government by the Aviation Minister Peter Thorneycroft led to the formation of the European European Launcher Development Organisation (ELDO) group. In response to this initiative, work on the Black Prince launcher by the RAE and Saunders Roe soon came to a halt as attention from the British government waned and European negotiations continued. Instead, British participation in the multinational Europa launcher programme had gradually taken precedence.

In several respects, the Europa launcher was relatively similar to the Black Prince; notably, both launchers used the Blue Streak as their first stage, albeit with some improvements being made by the time of the later Europa launches taking place. Europa combined the British-built Blue Streak with sections built by other nations, such as the French-built second stage and Italian-built payload fairing. However, being roughly the same size and payload capacity as the Black Prince, Europa suffered the same key problem of customer demand: it remained too expensive for scientific missions, but incapable of carrying the larger payloads sought by the commercial sector.

Ultimately, none of the ELDO members showed particular enthusiasm for the Europa launcher, which, according to Hill, was often regarded as being unnecessary and having been based on 'old technology', leading to the programme being both a political and technical failure. While the performance of Europa proved disappointing and below expectations, following further restructuring, it was succeeded by the commercially viable and successful Ariane family of launchers.

== Design ==
The Black Prince was an expendable launch system that comprised a combination of preexisting and in-development assets; the multi-stage launcher was to be formed of a Blue Streak first stage, a Black Knight (or Black Arrow) second stage, and a military solid rocket as a third stage. Several different third stages would be available, depending on the required payload and orbit. Examples of orbits suggested by Saunders Roe and the RAE were a 556 km (300 nmi) orbit for 'experiments in stellar UV spectroscopy', a 556–1,296 km (300-700 nmi (1,300 km)i) orbit for 'enabling investigations of the Earth's radiation belts,' and a 556–185,200 km (300-100,000 nmi (190,000 km)i) orbit for a 'Space probe.' According to Hill, the failure to tailor the Black Prince to perform a specific mission or to clearly identify and promote the launcher as a platform for a given mission type had been a major failing of the overall programme.

There were some problems with the design, however. The relative power of the rocket reduced with altitude. The solution requested by the government and provided by Saunders Roe was to use a high-energy cryogenic upper stage which would increase the payload to 408 kg (900 lb) to a 9,260 km (5,0 nmi (0 km)i) orbit, and 272 kg (600 lb) to a 16,670 km (9,0 nmi (0 km)i) orbit. The cost of developing the upper stage was estimated to be £5–7 million.

Payloads were estimated to be around 1,034 kg (2,280 lb) to a 370 km (200 nmi) orbit and 960 kg (2,117 lb) to a 740 km (400 nmi) orbit. However, the design was considered to be inefficient and difficult because of the large differences in the diameters of the 3 metre (10 ft) wide Blue Streak and the metre-wide (3 ft) Black Knight. Fitting satellites into a three-foot payload fairing could also have been a challenge. Nevertheless, these difficulties were also encountered with successful American rockets including the Thor and Atlas.
