= Europa (rocket) =

Rocket family

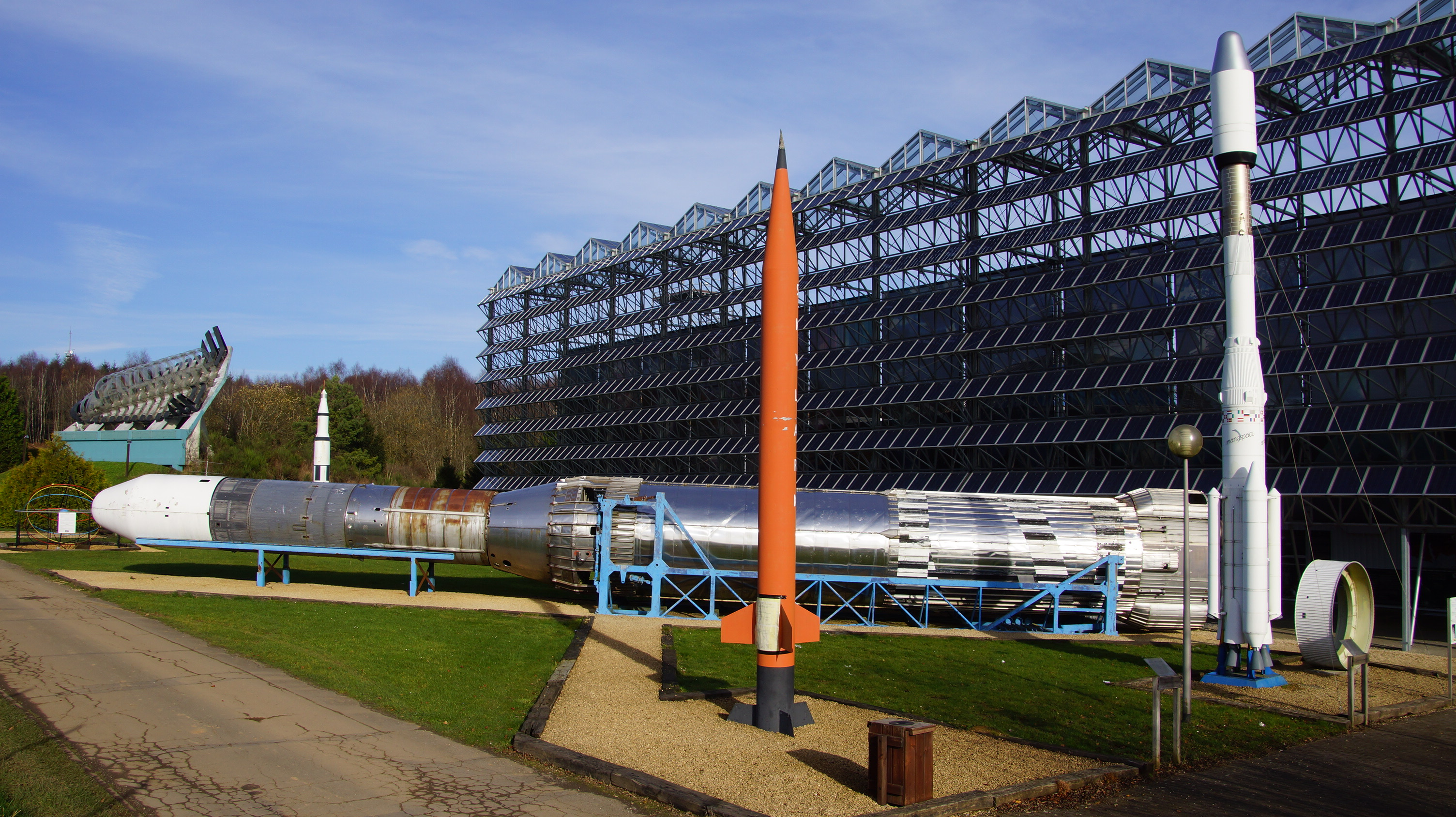
- Europa II rocket(larger horizontal rocket in the background. Front center-left is the Skylark sounding rocket, and a model of the Ariane 4 orbital rocket to the right) at Euro Space Center
- Function: Orbital carrier rocket
- Manufacturer: ELDO

Size
- Height: 33 m (108 ft)
- Diameter: 3.05 m (10.0 ft)
- Mass: 105,000 kg (231,000 lb)
- Stages: 3–4

Capacity

Payload to geostationary transfer orbit
- Mass: Europa I: 200 kg (440 lb); Europa II: 360 kg (790 lb)

Launch history
- Status: Retired
- Launch sites: Woomera, LA-6; Guiana, BEC
- Total launches: 11: 5 Blue Streak; 2 Blue Streak/Coralie; 3 Europa I; 1 Europa II
- Success(es): 4 (all Blue Streak)
- Failure(s): 7: 1 Blue Streak; 2 Blue Streak/Coralie; 3 Europa I; 1 Europa II
- First flight: Blue Streak: 4 June 1964; Coralie: 4 August 1967; Europa I: 29 November 1968; Europa II: 5 November 1971
- Last flight: Blue Streak: 14 November 1966; Coralie: 4 December 1967; Europa I: 12 November 1970; Europa II: 5 November 1971

First stage – Blue Streak
- Powered by: 2 × Rolls-Royce RZ.2
- Maximum thrust: 1,673 kN (376,000 lb_{f})
- Specific impulse: 282 s (2.77 km/s)
- Burn time: 156 seconds
- Propellant: RP-1 / LOX

Second stage – Coralie
- Powered by: 4 × LRBA Vexin-A
- Maximum thrust: 270 kN (61,000 lb_{f})
- Specific impulse: 277 s (2.72 km/s)
- Burn time: 96 seconds
- Propellant: UDMH / N_{2}O_{4}

Third stage – Astris
- Powered by: 1 × Astris
- Maximum thrust: 23.3 kN (5,200 lb_{f})
- Specific impulse: 310 s (3.0 km/s)
- Burn time: 330 seconds
- Propellant: Aerozine 50 / N_{2}O_{4}

Fourth stage (Europa II) – P068

The Europa rocket was an early expendable launch system of the European Launcher Development Organisation (ELDO), which was the precursor to the European Space Agency (ESA). It was developed with the aim to delivering space access technology, and more specifically to facilitate the deployment of European-wide telecommunication and meteorological satellites into orbit.

The program ultimately traces its history to the British Blue Streak missile, which was cancelled in 1960. Blue Streak was then used as the basis of the Black Prince expendable launch system and several other concepts. Looking for partners to share development costs, ELDO was formed and began development of the Europa using the Blue Streak first stage along with the French-built Coralie second stage and German Astris upper stage.

The programme proceeded to perform multiple test launches but these frequently resulted in partial failures. In addition, Britain decided to pull out of the ELDO organisation, and thus Europa, to focus on the rival all-British Black Arrow launcher instead. Confidence in the programme had diminished due to the poor reliability figures, and this led to its termination.

Although the UK left the programme, the other ELDO partners were still interested in a launcher. They re-formed as the European Space Agency (ESA) in 1974 and proceeded to develop the Ariane family of launchers, which would prove to be a commercial success with hundreds of launches performed.

== Development ==
=== Background ===
During the early 1950s, the British government had identified the need to develop its own series of ballistic missiles due to advances being made in this field, particularly by the Soviet Union and the United States. A British programme to develop such a missile, named Blue Streak, was promptly initiated; however, there were key questions over the then-relatively unknown scenario of what such a vehicle would encounter when attempting re-entry to the atmosphere, there were fears that such a vehicle might simply burn up like a meteor and therefore be unachievable. Accordingly, during 1955, the Black Knight research rocket programme was commenced for this purpose. Following several launches, the Black Knight came to be regarded as a successful programme, having produced a relatively low cost and reliable rocket, and thus there was impetus present to proceed with further development of the platform.

On 13 April 1960, the Defence Minister Harold Watkinson announced the cancellation of Blue Streak as a military programme, and went on to state that: "the Government will now consider with the firms and other interests concerned, as a matter of urgency, whether the Blue Streak programme could be adapted for the development of a launcher for space satellites." While development of the Blue Streak missile continued with the view of using it as a capable satellite launcher, the rate of work was substantially slowed. Aerospace author C.N. Hill wrote that this declaration had been made: "Mainly, I suspect, to minimise the political damage that ensued from the [Blue Streak] decision".

In 1957, a proposed design, known as Black Prince, was put forward by Desmond King-Hele and Doreen Gilmour of the Royal Aircraft Establishment (RAE) during 1957. As envisioned by this proposal, an expendable launch system could be developed using a mix of preexisting and in-development assets; the multi-stage launcher was to be formed of a Blue Streak first stage, a Black Knight (or later a Black Arrow) second stage, and a military solid rocket as a third stage.

In 1960, the Royal Aircraft Establishment at Farnborough was given the job of considering how the Blue Streak missile could be adapted as a satellite launching vehicle, in conjunction with other rocket stages. Accordingly, the 1957 concept design for a combined Blue Streak-Black Knight launcher was put forward once again, and this time received a favourable appraisal; the project was assigned the rainbow code of Black Prince; in official documentation, the platform was referred to as the Blue Streak Satellite Launch Vehicle (BSSLV). However, it was quickly recognised that the programme's cost would be a major issue, one estimate of the total development costs would have been equal to half of the British university budget.

Along with the high costs involved, it was becoming clear that, due to British military satellites already being delivered by American launchers and the domestic science community being perceived as lacking the funding to conduct multiple major research satellite programmes at once, domestic demand for such a launcher was not guaranteed. Accordingly, it was decided that it would be preferable for other nations to be involved in the programme in order to share the burden of the costs and to be predisposed to making use of the launcher. Diplomatic approaches were made to various nations, however it became obvious that the members of the Commonwealth of Nations alone were not prepared to provide the necessary backing for such a programme.

=== Collaboration ===
As early as 1961, Peter Thorneycroft, the Minister of Aviation, had been thinking about a joint European project, in order not to waste the advanced development of the Blue Streak, and not to leave space exploration to the Americans and Russians. Britain made diplomatic approaches to various European nations: the most significant of these was to France. Overtures between the British government and the French government on potential cooperation on missile research, and specifically on the potential use of the Blue Streak as early as 1957. Britain and France agreed to serve as the lead nations on the envisioned programme, but recognised that other partner nations would be necessary.

Both France and Britain approached various other nations to join on the collaborative programme, however negotiations with interested nations were often protracted, in part due to scepticism; author C.N. Hill stated that "many countries thought that the U.K. was seeking to foist an obsolescent launch vehicle on them, and making them pay the costs". The participation of many nations hinged upon gaining the endorsement of Germany, which was eventually won over and chose to participate. As a result of this diplomacy, it was decided to proceed with the formation of the European Launcher Development Organisation (ELDO) group.

The headquarters of ELDO were in Paris. The founding members were Belgium, France, the United Kingdom, Italy, the Netherlands and West Germany: Australia, Spain, Switzerland, Norway, and Sweden had chosen not to participate. ELDO not only served the purpose of harnessing Blue Streak, but also fulfilled ambitions to produce a European rival to the American and Soviet launchers being developed and deployed at that time. In response to the rise of the ELDO initiative, work on the competing Black Prince launcher gradually came to a halt as attention from the British government drifted towards European collaboration.

After studying various designs and concepts, ELDO arrived at a three-stage approach which was given the designation Eldo A; this was later formally named as Europa. According to Hill, Black Prince and Europa were comparable launchers, capable of delivering similar performance and roughly the same payloads; the overlap left little room for both programmes. However, there was criticisms that Europa would take longer to deliver than the Black Prince launcher for no significant improvement, while suffering from the same core economic problem of being too expensive for scientific satellites while too small for commercial communications satellites.

In January 1965, the French thought the initial three-stage rocket design would not be sufficiently advanced to carry the size of payloads required, while another rocket – referred to as Eldo B – which featured liquid hydrogen-fuelled second and third stages, came to be viewed as a superior design, partly due to reduce the cost of the project by eliminating transition test launchers. It would still use the Blue Streak as the first stage. The ELDO later disagreed, but the French would ultimately get their way when Eldo B became the foundation for the later Ariane launcher, which first launched in 1979.

=== Rising costs and restructuring ===
By April 1966, the project's estimated costs had increased to £150 million from an initial estimate of £70 million. By this point, hopes amongst several of the participants were not high that Europa would be suitable for the envisioned task; the Italians wanted to abandon the ELDO and instead participate in a single European space organisation that would not be as nationally divided as the ELDO. The first launch had been originally planned for November 1966; however, the first two-stage launch occurred in August 1967, while the full three stages (Europa 1) performed its first combined launch in November 1968.

During the mid-1960s, Britain had been contributing 40 per cent of the programme's costs. In early June 1966, the British government (Fred Mulley) decided it could not afford the cost of Europa and sought to leave the ELDO organisation – one of the few European organisations by which point it had become a lead player. Britain's contribution was reduced to 27 per cent. This was also at a time when satellite technology was on the verge of changing the world. However, the soon-to-be-common geosynchronous satellites necessitated being positioned at an altitude of 22,000 miles (35 400 km) above Earth, which was far beyond the performance of Europa 1, being capable of launching satellites to a 125 miles (201 km) altitude.

In November 1968, a European Space Conference held in Bonn decided on a proposal to merge the ELDO with the ESRO, forming a pan-European space authority by early 1970; known as the European Space Agency (ESA), this organisation would not be formed until 1975. Britain was lukewarm to the idea and did not believe that Europe could launch satellites economically. By 1970, the French launch base in French Guiana had cost £45 million, and in that year France became the most important partner in the project, then planning to build two-thirds of the rocket as well as owning the launch site. Although only on paper, Britain's involvement in the project has been much reduced, after being largely responsible (with an Australian launch site) for getting the entire project going in the first place. However, all of the launchers, to the very end of the programme, were completely dependent on the British rocket used for the first stage.

By 1970, the project was under a perceived economic threat from America's offer to fly satellites for foreign powers on a reimbursable basis. That agreement had been signed between ESRO and NASA on 30 December 1966 and by 1970 it was becoming clear that the advantage in having a national launch vehicle was insufficient to justify the cost. In 1972, NASA approved development of the reusable Space Shuttle, which at that time was largely perceived to eventually offer greater savings over the launching of satellites using an expendable system. These hopes the Shuttle delivering lower costs would ultimately prove to be hollow. By 1971, over £250 million had been spent on the Europa programme; the Europa 2 itself cost over £4 million.

On 27 April 1973, Europa was abandoned. On 21 September 1973, the legal agreement for the L3S, which later became known as the Ariane 1, was signed. Under this agreement, the Europa III was formally cancelled, while the L3S would be developed as a multinational project. From the onset, this new launcher was to be developed for the purpose of sending commercial satellites into geosynchronous orbit, unlike many other competing launchers, which had been typically developed for other purposes and subsequently adapted, such as ballistic missiles.

=== Division of labour ===
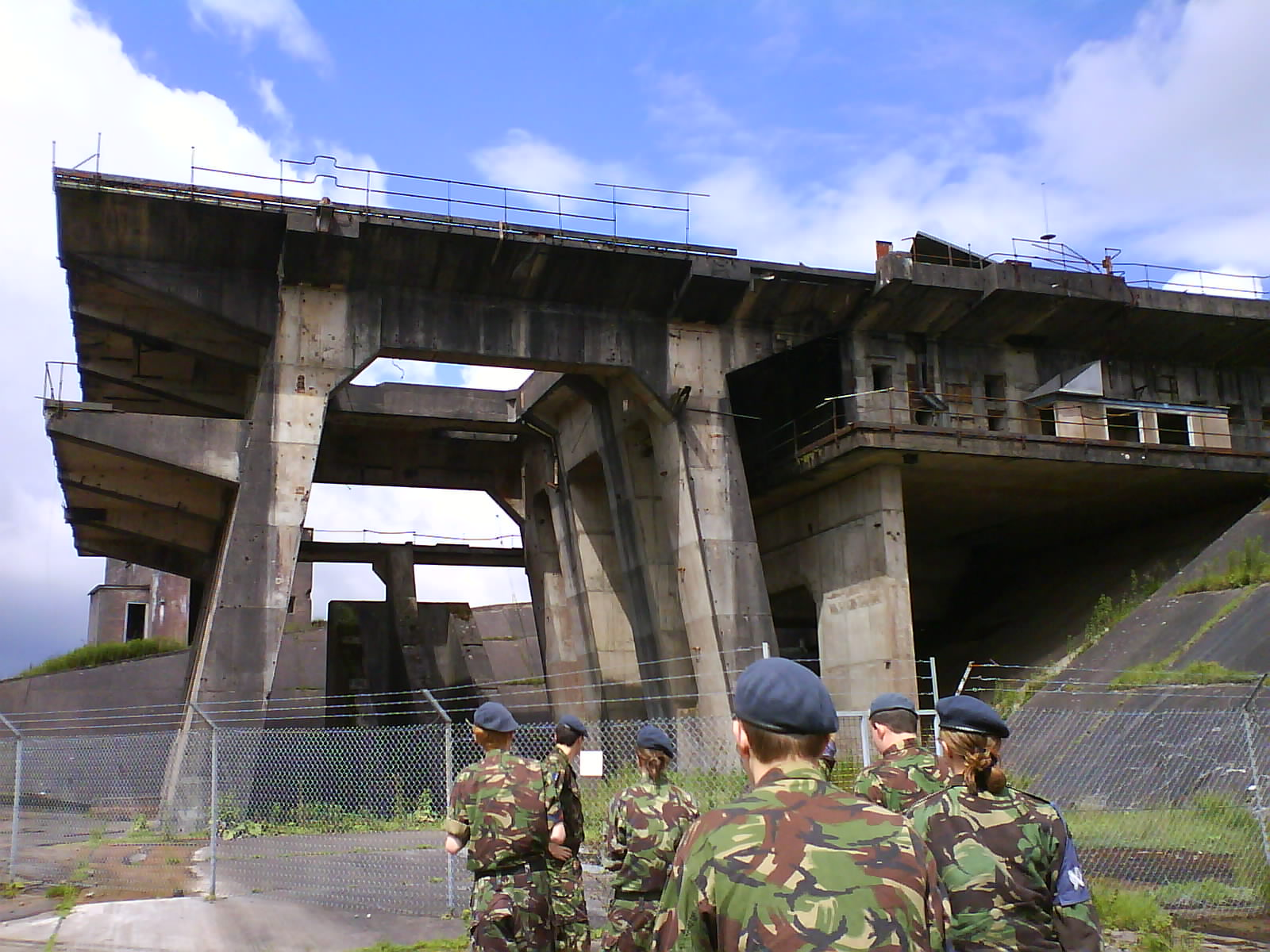
Test site at RAF Spadeadam in Cumbria

Workshare on the programme was a politically charged matter. Tasks were to be distributed between nations: the United Kingdom would provide the first stage (derived from the Blue Streak missile), France would build the second and Germany would construct the third stage. It would carry a satellite, which would be designed and manufactured in Italy, and weighted roughly a ton. The telemetry was to be developed by the Netherlands, while Belgium was to develop the downrange ground guidance system.

By 1969, the ELDO was beginning to realize that dividing work up by country led to not enough overall collaboration and had resulted in a disjointed framework of planning. This disjointed structure has been accredited as having been responsible for the lack of successful launch. In effect, there had been no single authority or group that was entirely responsible or in control of Europa. Notably, in November 1971, the West Germans publicly blamed the failure and explosion of Europa 2 upon immense divisions within ELDO.

=== Programme stages ===
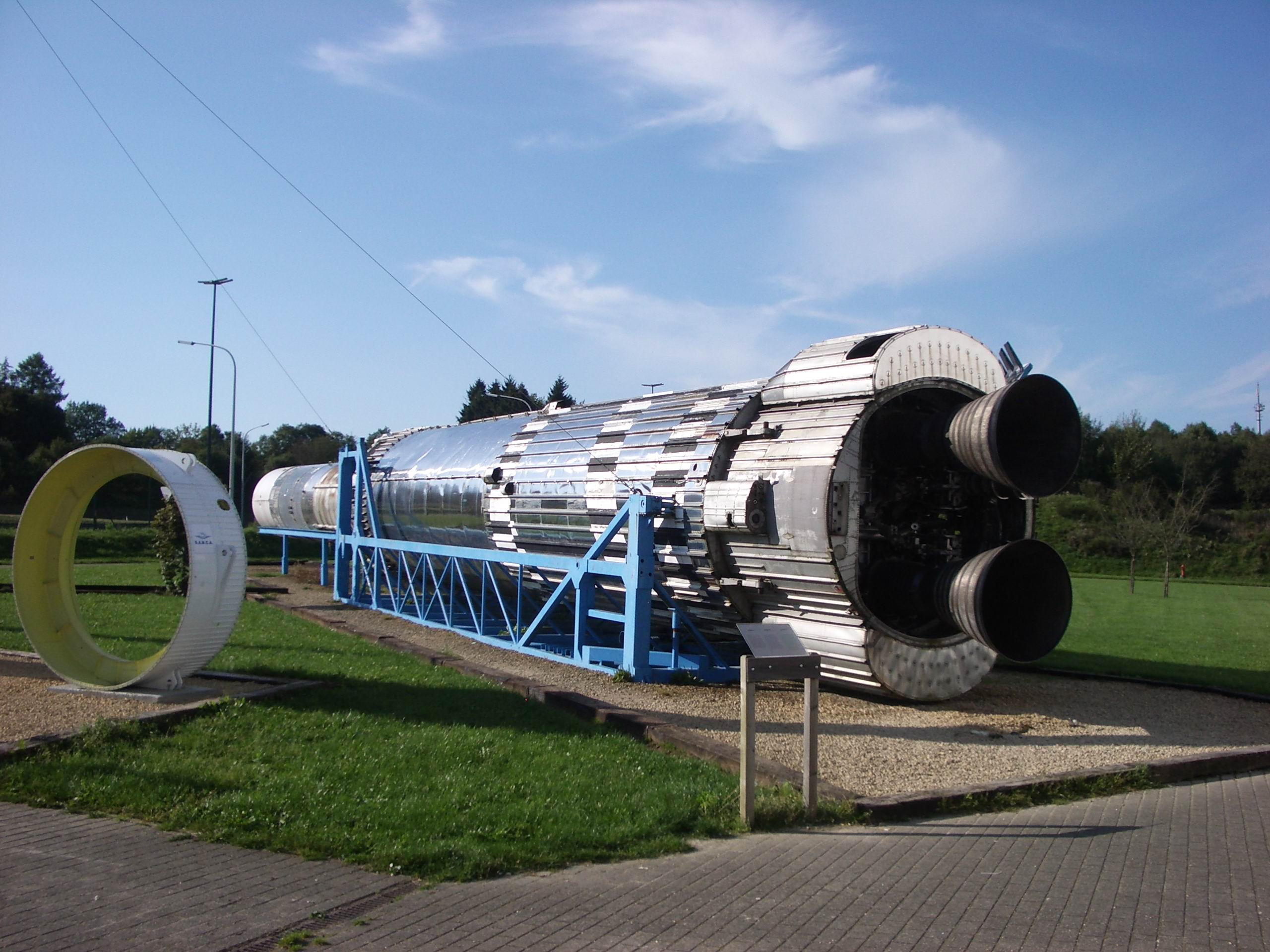
Europa 2 rocket

The Europa programme was divided into 4 separate projects intended to follow each other in succession. Ultimately, only two of these projects would have any launches conducted, the third project being cancelled while the fourth remained a case study only:

- Europa 1: 4 unsuccessful launches
- Europa 2: 1 unsuccessful launch
- Europa 3: Cancelled before any launch occurred
- Europa 4: Study only, later cancelled

== Versions ==
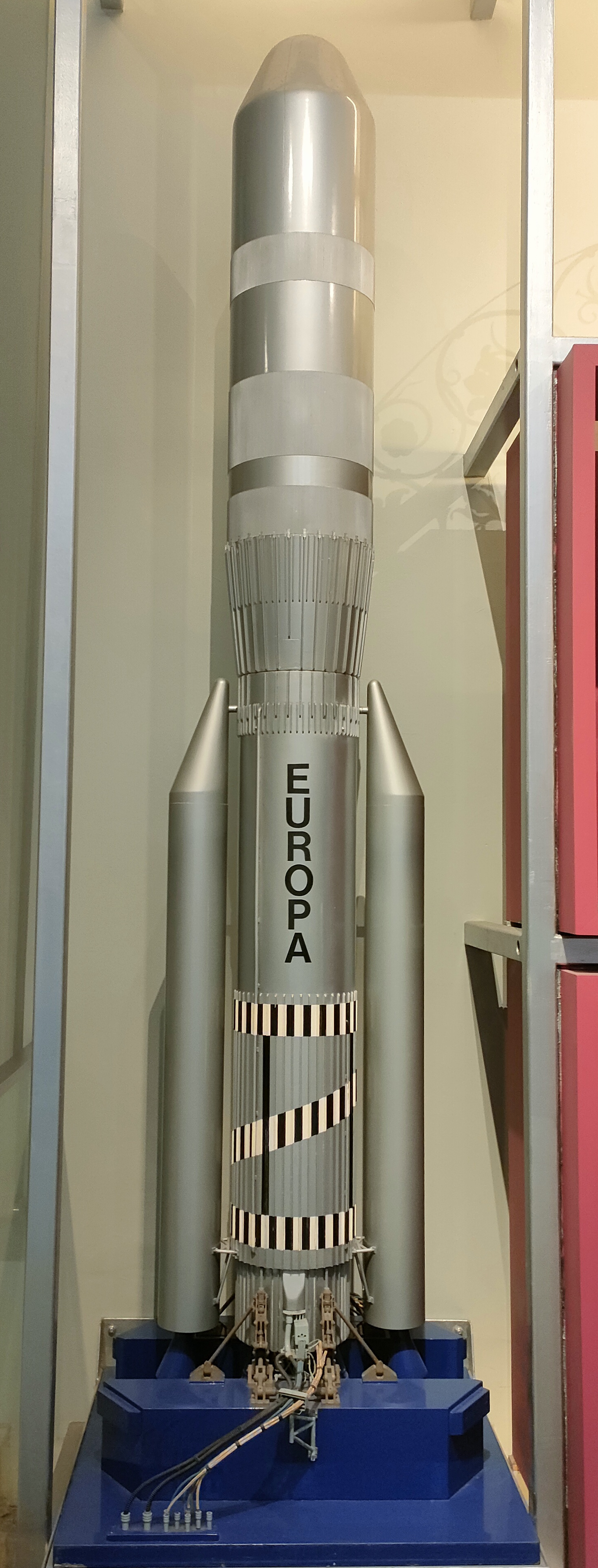
Europa 3 model

Born out of the cooperation between multiple countries, the first version was named ELDO-A and then Europa 1, and was composed of three stages:

- "Blue Streak" first stage, built by Britain,
- "Coralie" second stage, built by France,
- "Astris" third stage, built by Germany.

The second version named Europa 2 was financed by France and Germany. This configuration added a fourth stage derived from Diamant BP4 third stage.

A third version named Europa 3 was studied in the 1970s. The project was abandoned, but its planned first stage was the basis of Ariane.

== Design ==
=== Payloads ===
The payload for the rocket was overseen by the European Space Research Organization – ESRO. Satellites were proposed to be launched by 1969 or 1970, in a circular polar orbit at an altitude of 125 miles (201 km). ESRO organised the development of early satellites such as ESRO 2B (Iris), built by Hawker Siddeley Dynamics and Engins Matra.

In 1967, it was decided the payloads were to be launched by 1970 from French Guiana, not Australia. In April 1969, Britain decided to invest in a satellite television project by the European Broadcasting Union.

By the early 1970s the French-German Symphonie communications satellite were in production, but by then Europa was cancelled in November 1971.

=== First stage ===
The Blue Streak first stage was tested three times in 1964, and also in 1965, with dummy upper stages in 1965. It was assisted by the British National Committee for Space Research. The chief project engineer of the rocket's assembly at the space projects division of Hawker Siddeley Dynamics was Dr Geoffrey Pardoe, also the project manager of Blue Streak from 1956 to 1960 (when under de Havilland). In August 1965, the Blue Streak was tested (static firing trial) with (complete full-weight) dummy upper stages at RAF Spadeadam (the site was owned by Rolls-Royce), with first successful firing on 23 September 1965 lasting 135 seconds. Five days later the site was visited by the Minister of Aviation, Roy Jenkins.

In January 1966, it had been transported to Adelaide, Australia, for launches later that year. Also in the UK in 1967 the go-ahead had been given for the UK's (separately developed) three-stage Black Arrow rocket launcher (made by Westland Aircraft, with Bristol Siddeley rocket engines developed at the Rocket Propulsion Establishment at Westcott, Buckinghamshire) – Britain did not need to rely on Europa, and Black Arrow would be ready first. Britain then withdrew from ELDO, to concentrate on the Black Arrow, but was committed to supplying ELDO with two Blue Streak rocket stages a year until 1976. At this time in 1969, Britain was spending £30 million a year on space, controlled from the Space Division of the Ministry of Technology. Britain was still dealing with, and funding, ESRO.

By 1970, Hawker Siddeley's Blue Streak launcher had cost £100 million to develop. Blue Streak was used for the Europa 2's one and only launch on 5 November 1971.

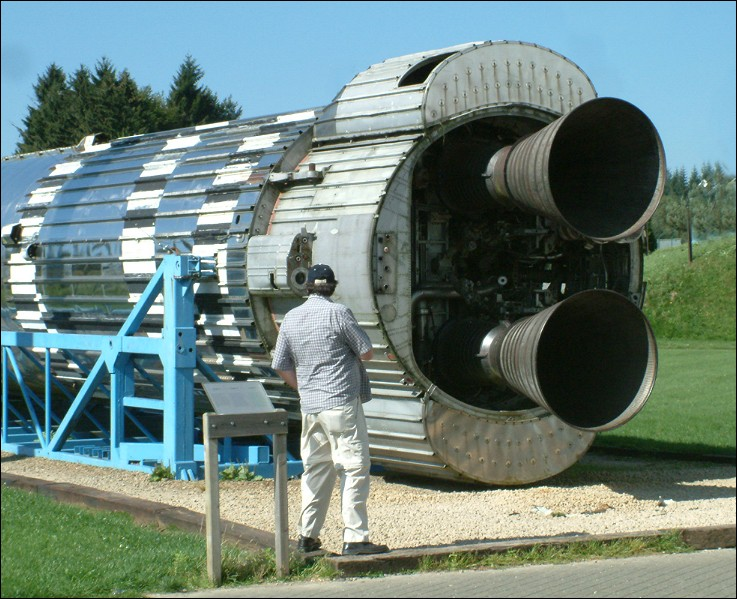
Blue Streak stage engines on display at Euro Space Center

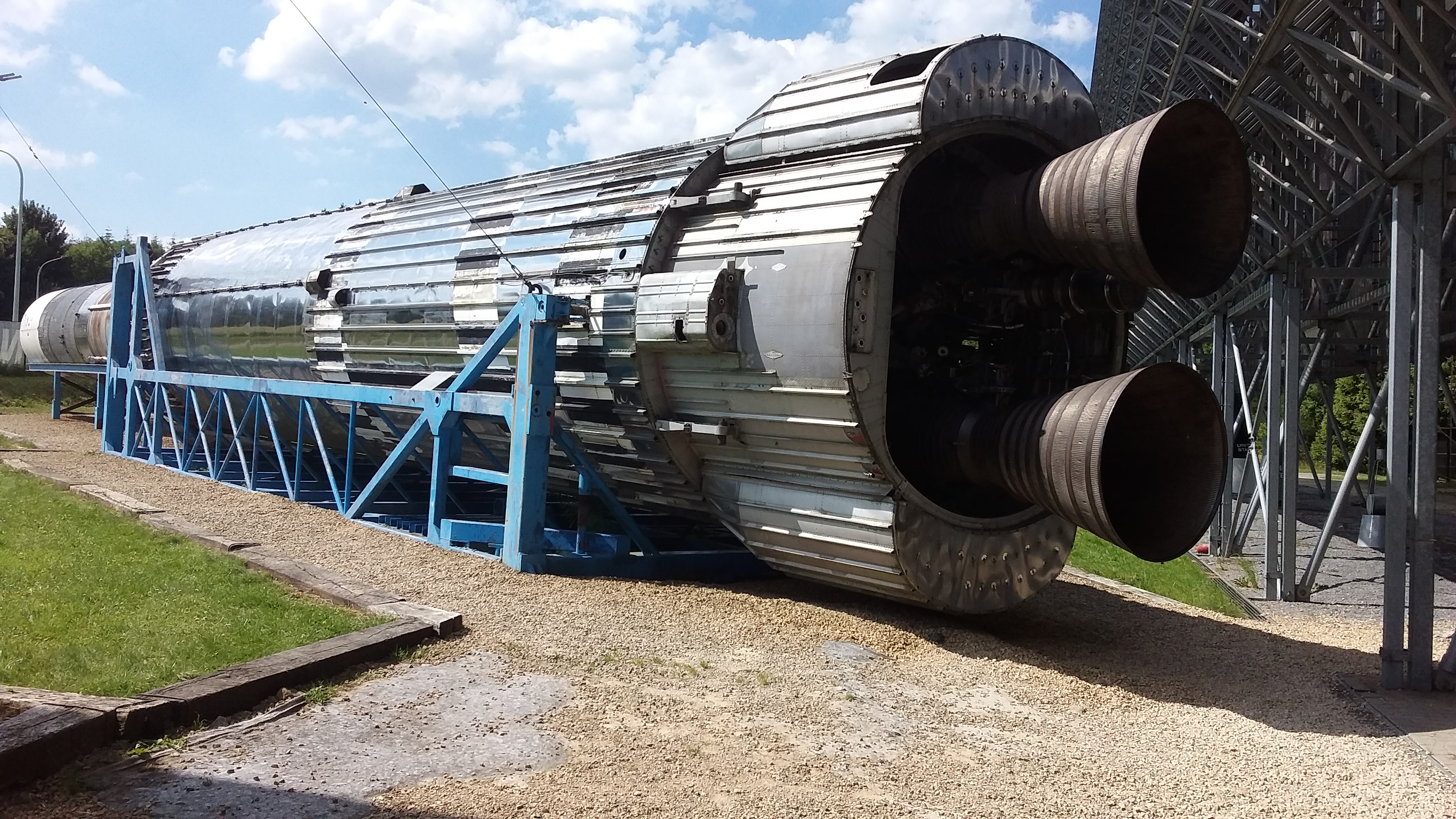
Blue Streak stage, engine view

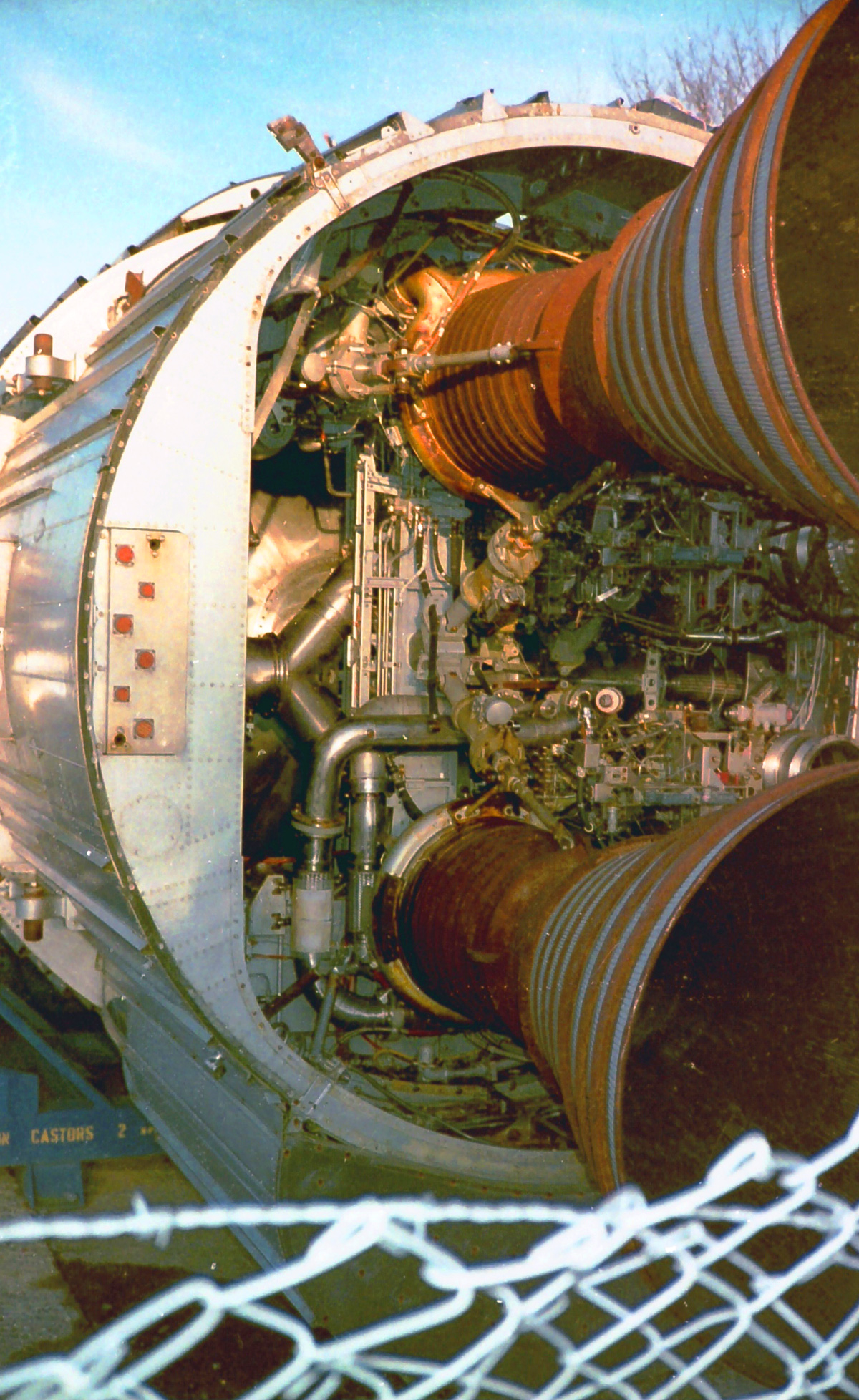
Blue Streak stage, bottom view

=== Second stage ===
Coralie tests began in December 1965 at Vernon, Eure in France, west of Paris (Société Européenne de Propulsion - SEP, at Vernon, would later develop the Viking main engines for Ariane).

In 1966 and 1967 operations moved to the CIEES test range near Hammaguir, Algeria using the Cora rocket.

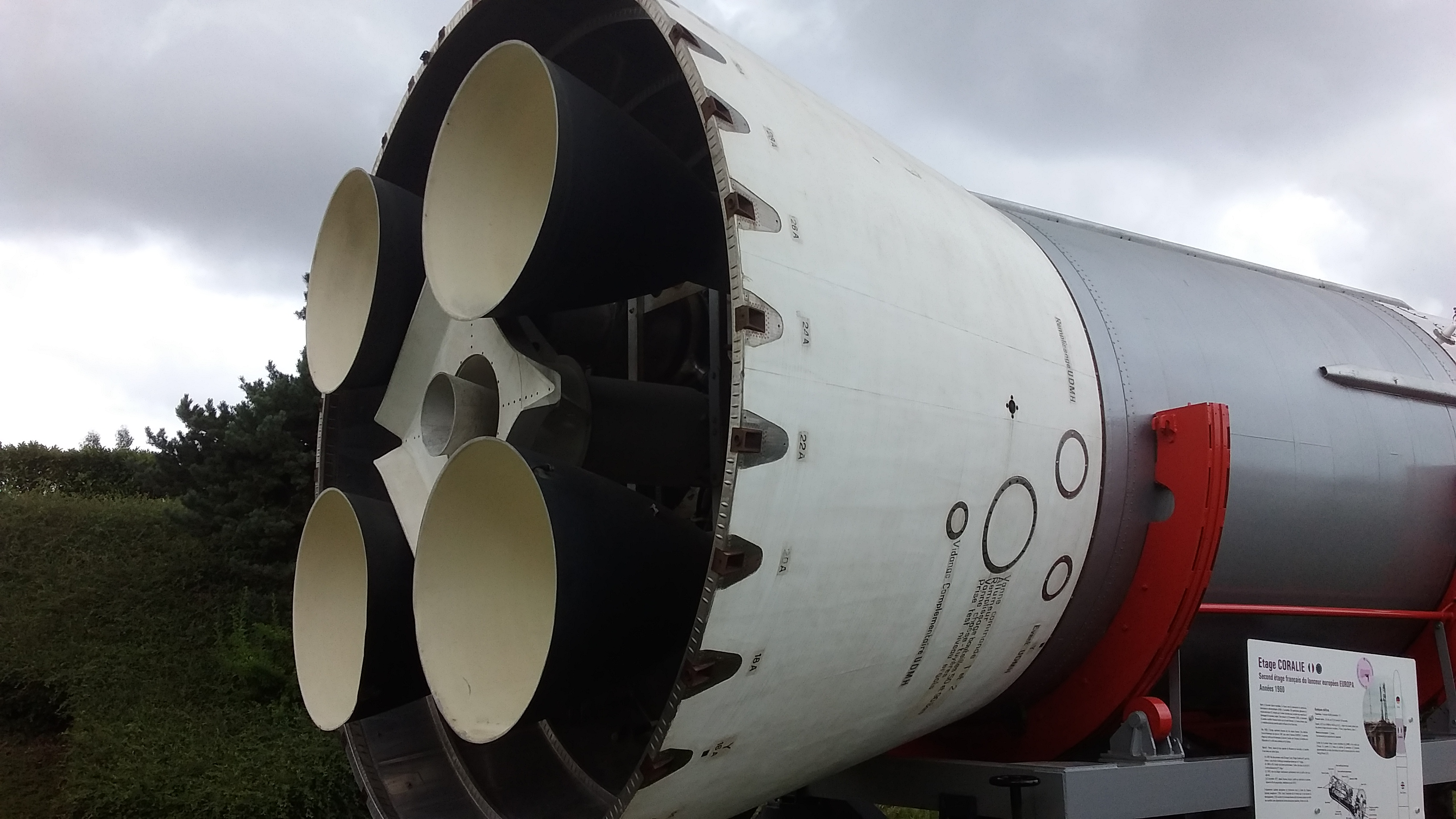
Coralie stage, bottom view

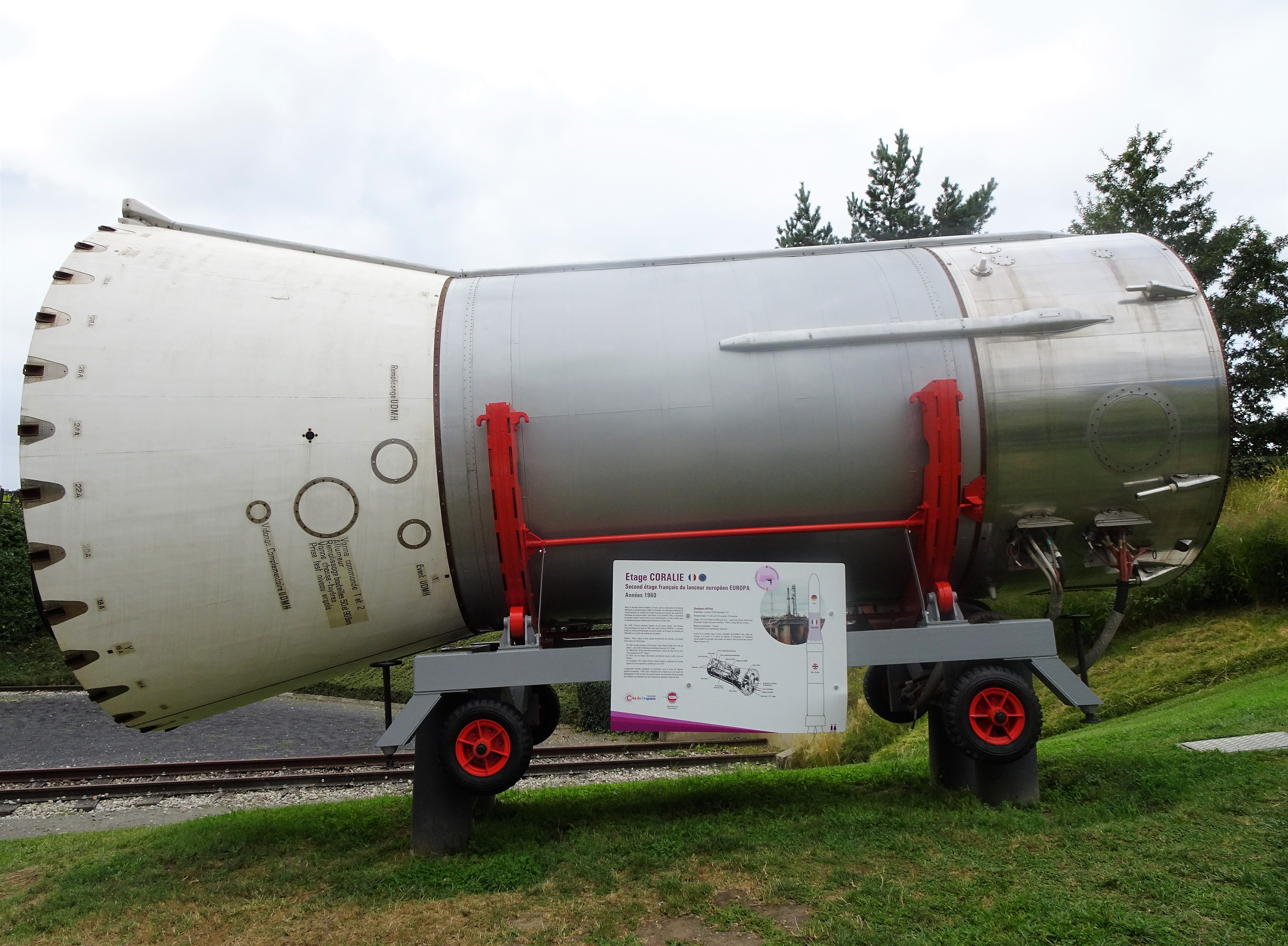
Coralie stage, side view

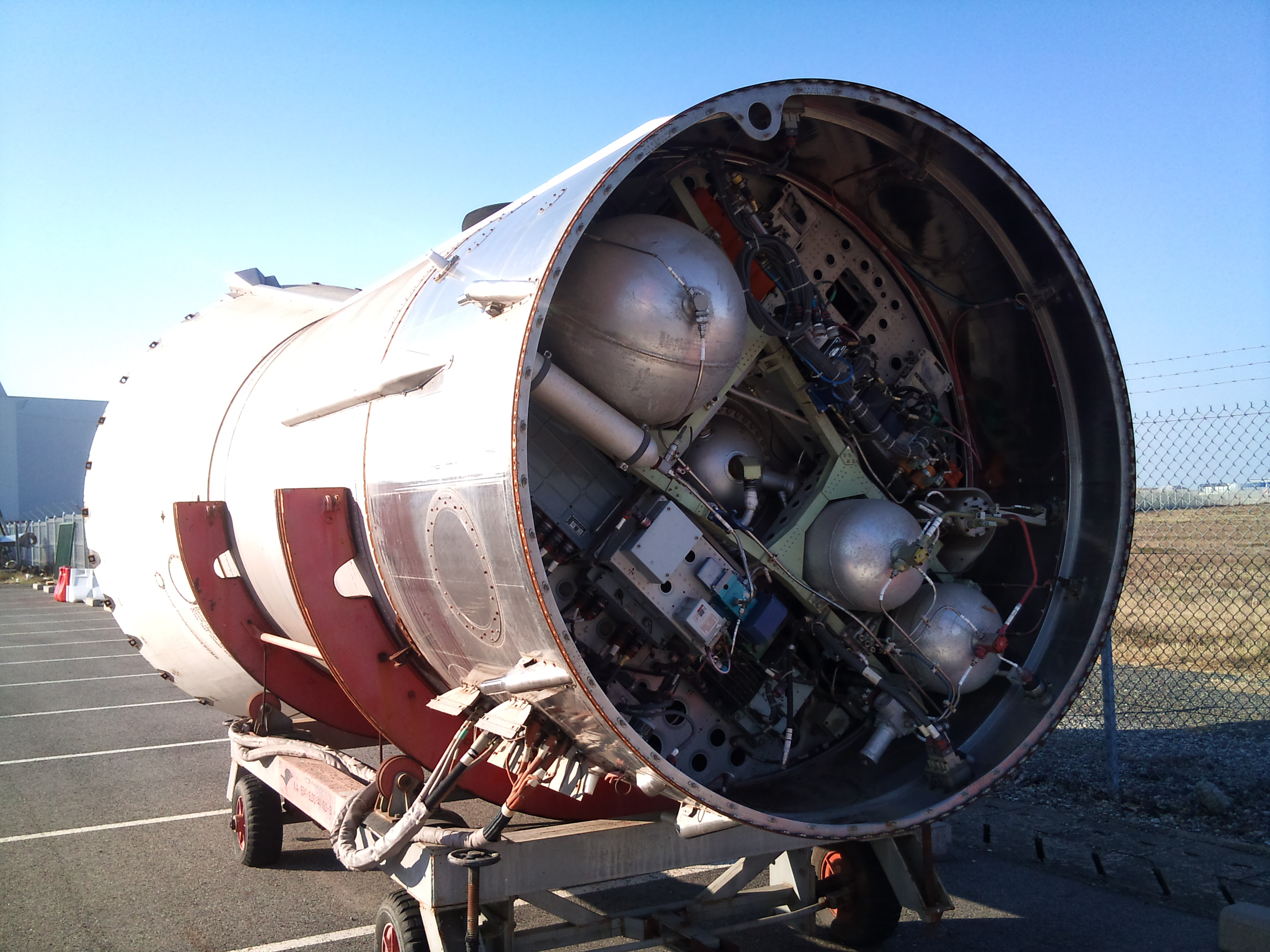
Coralie stage, top view

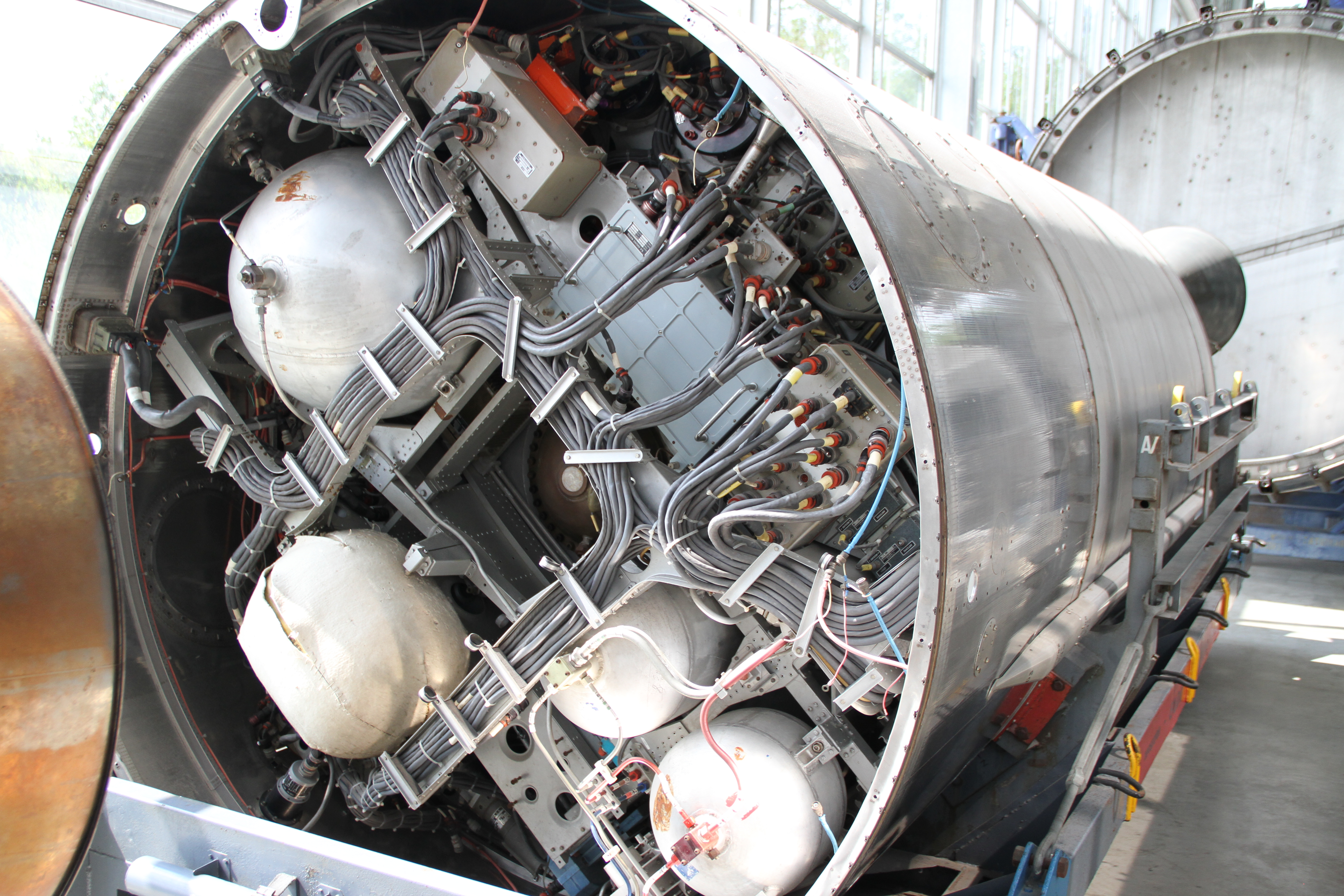
Coralie stage, top view

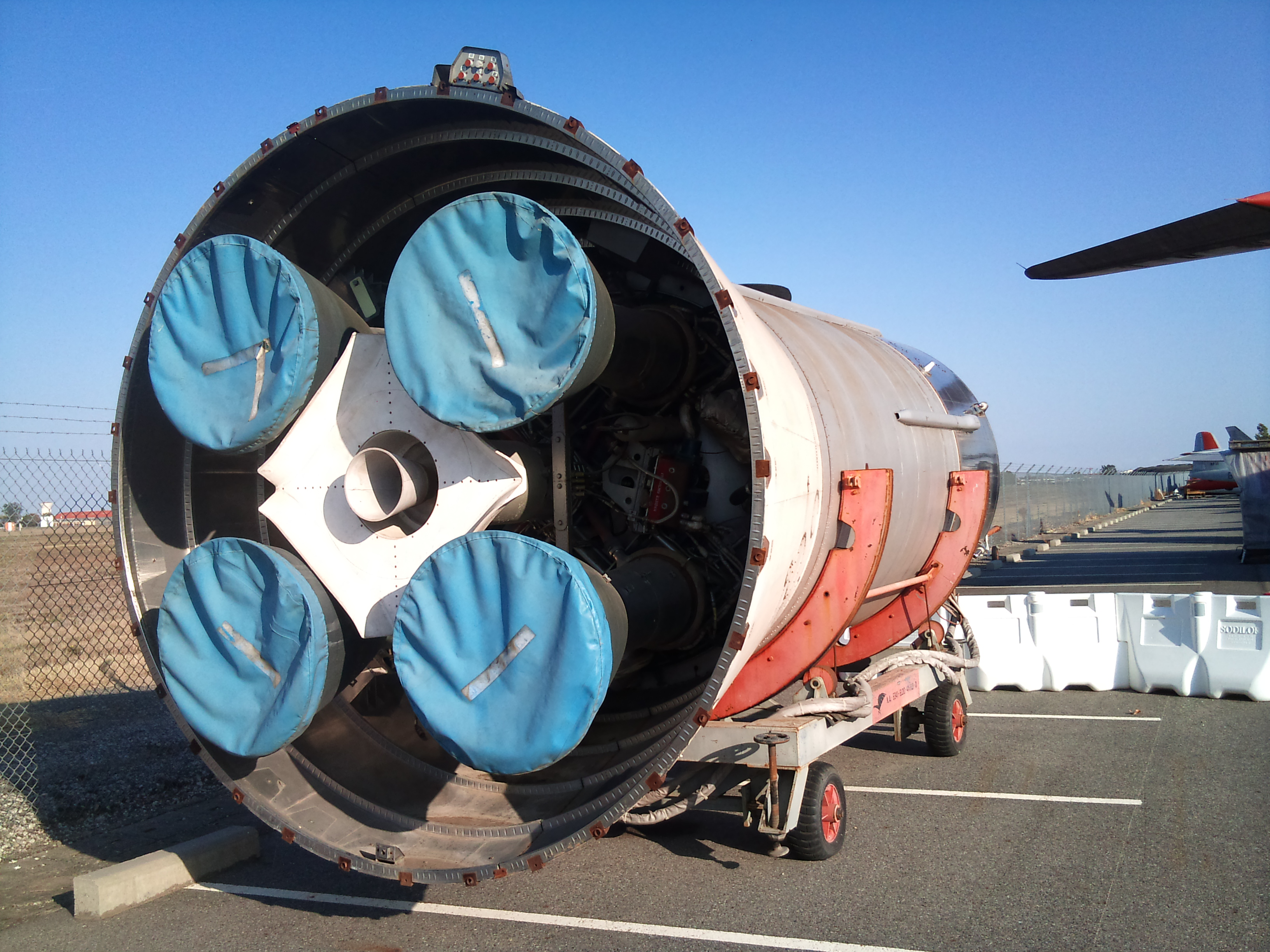
Coralie stage, bottom view

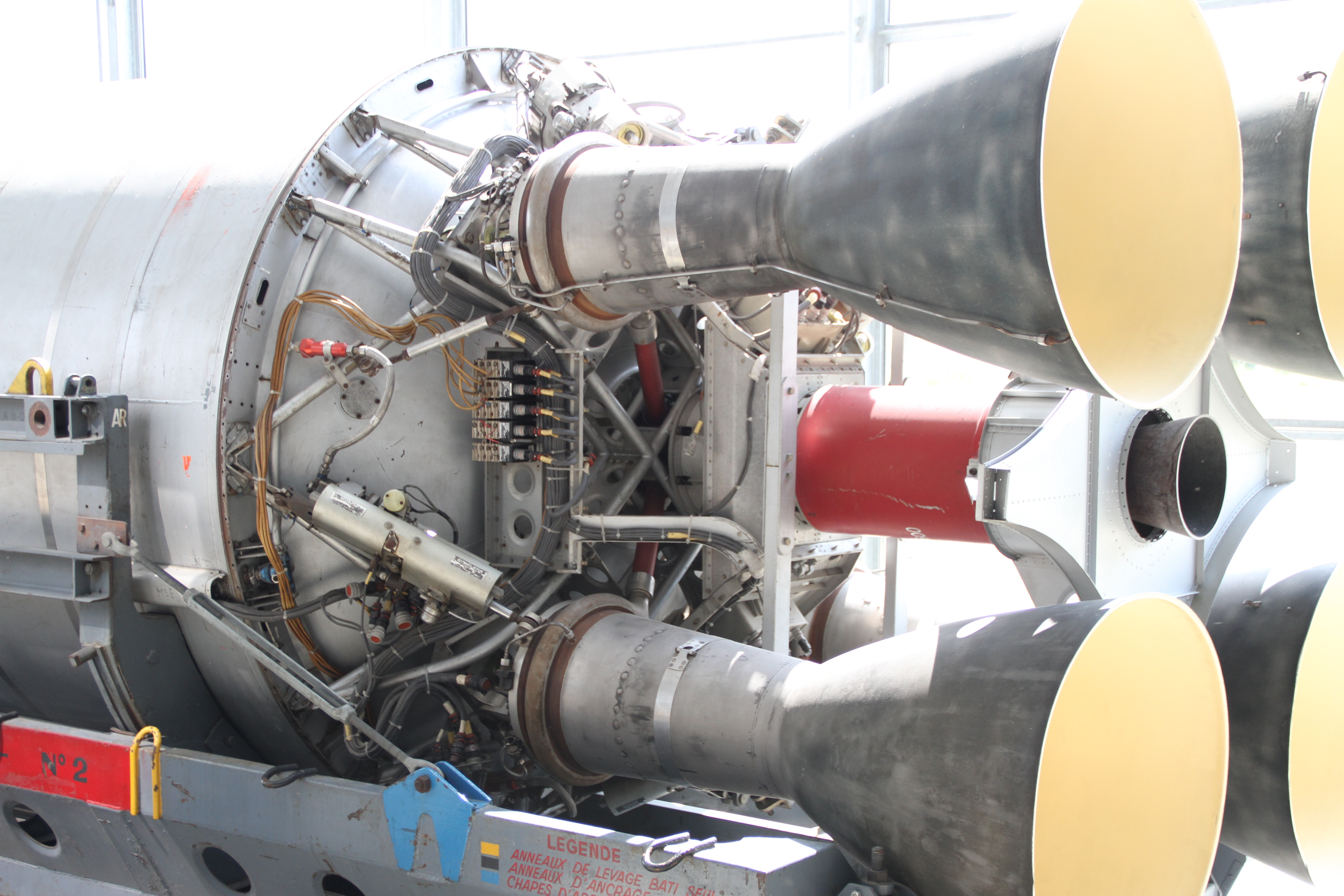
Coralie stage engines

=== Third stage ===
The Astris third stage was made in Germany by Entwicklungsring Nord (ERNO Raumfahrttechnik GmbH), based in Bremen, from 1969. The German consortium itself was known as Arbeitsgemeinschaft Satellitenträgersystem (ASAT), which consisted of ERNO and MBB. Although assembled by ERNO in Bremen, the engine was made by Société d'Etudes pour la Propulsion par Réaction (SEPR), part of Snecma in Villaroche.

On 2 July 1969, on a launch at Woomera of the three-stage 108-foot (33 m) rocket, the Astris third stage failed to light, after the other two had successfully fired.

After the third stage, an apogee kick motor would be used to put a satellite into a synchronous orbit.

ERNO would later develop the second stage for the Ariane launcher, at the Vereinigte Flugtechnische Werke (VFW) factory in Bremen, later owned by Daimler Benz Aerospace then DaimlerChrysler Aerospace (DASA).

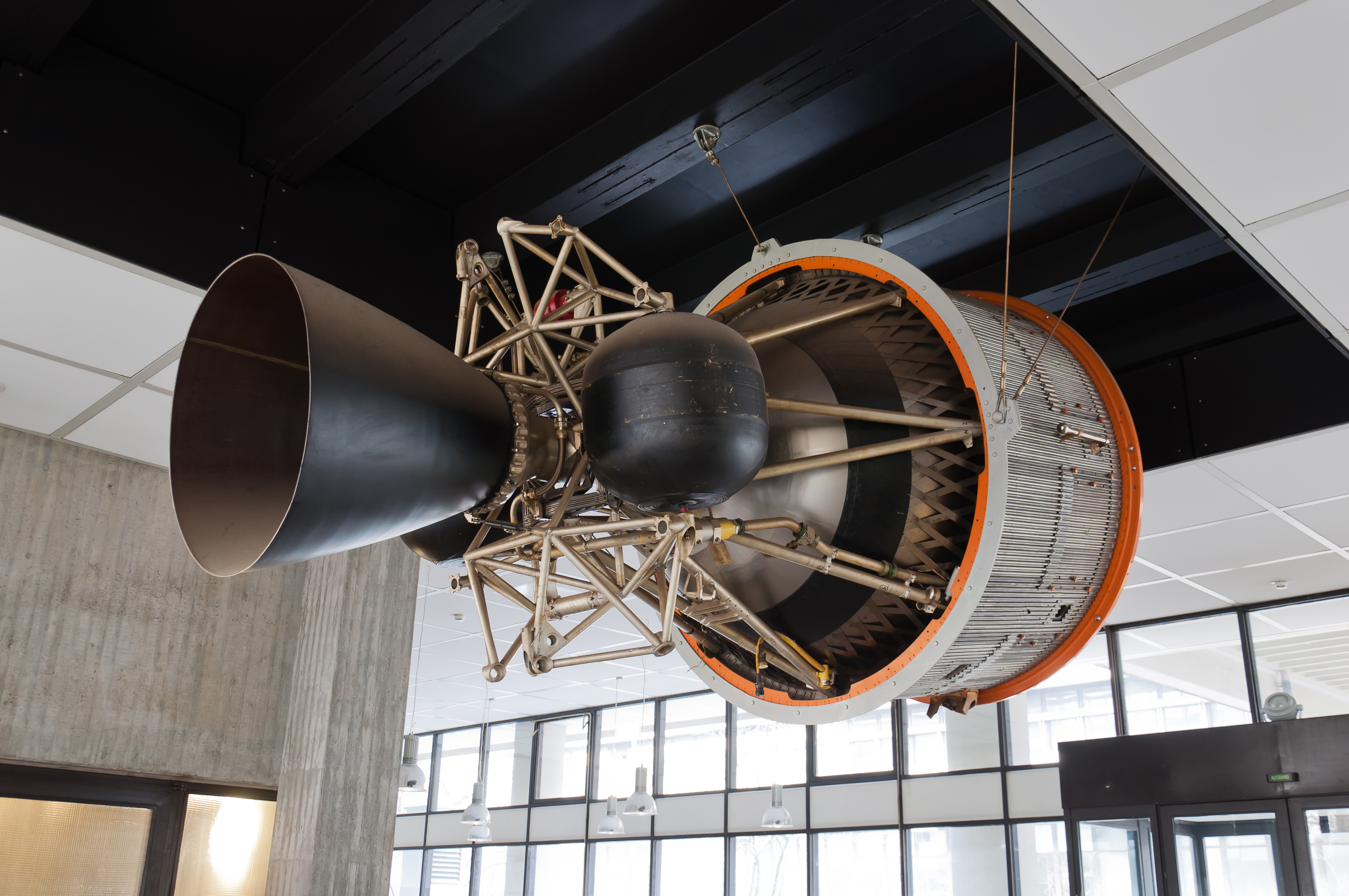
Astris on display on the campus of University of Stuttgart

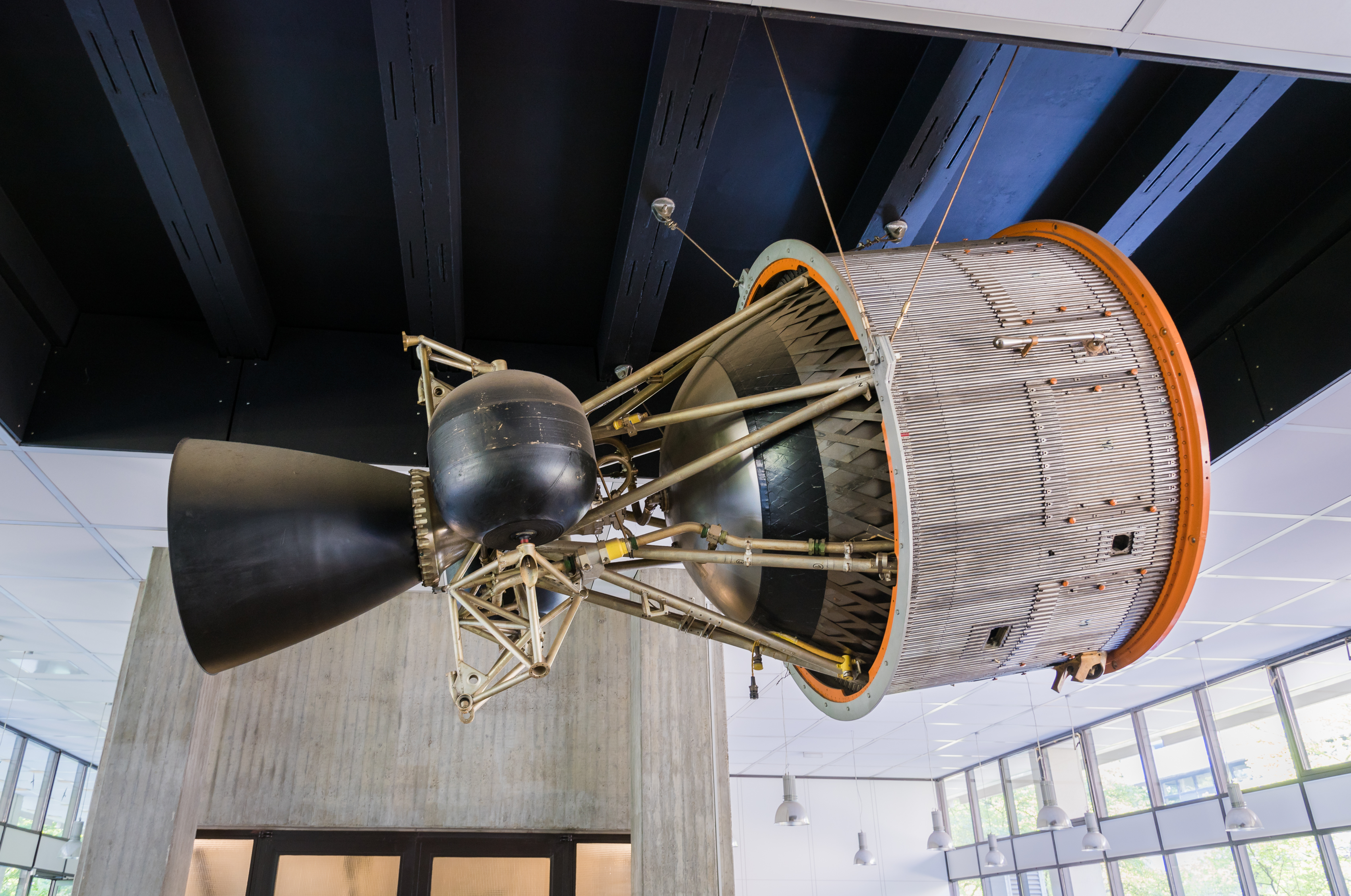
Astris side view

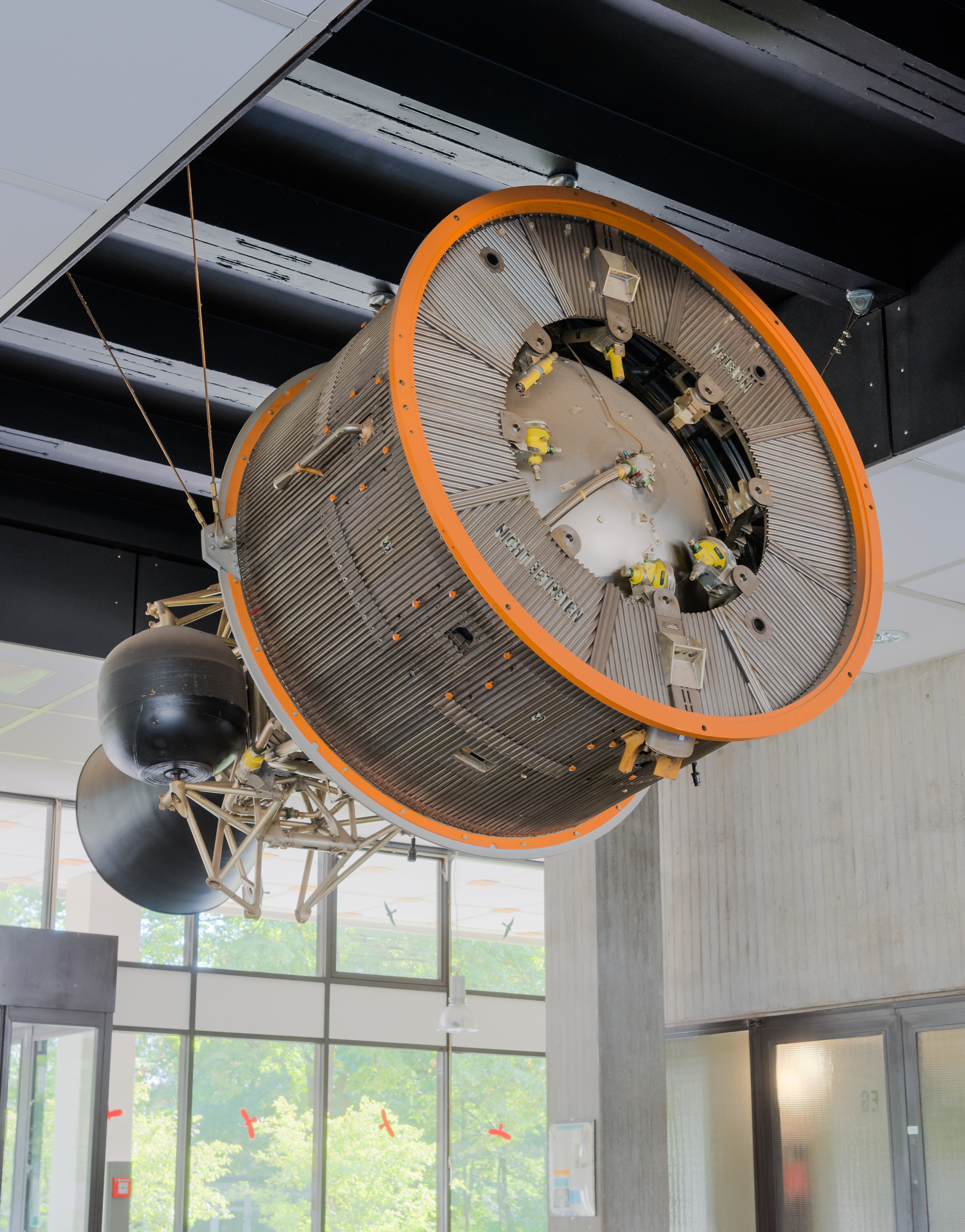
Astris front view

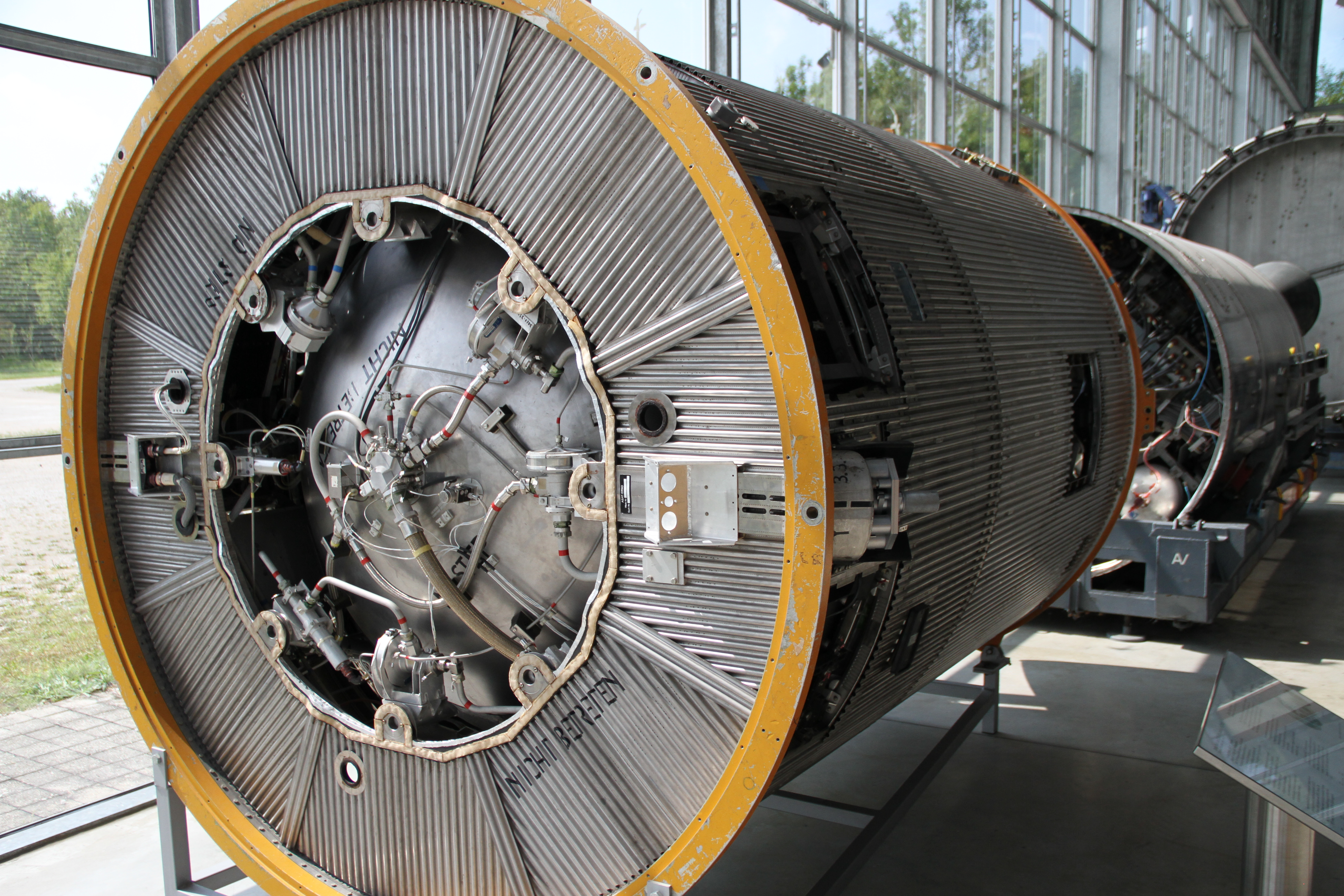
Astris top view

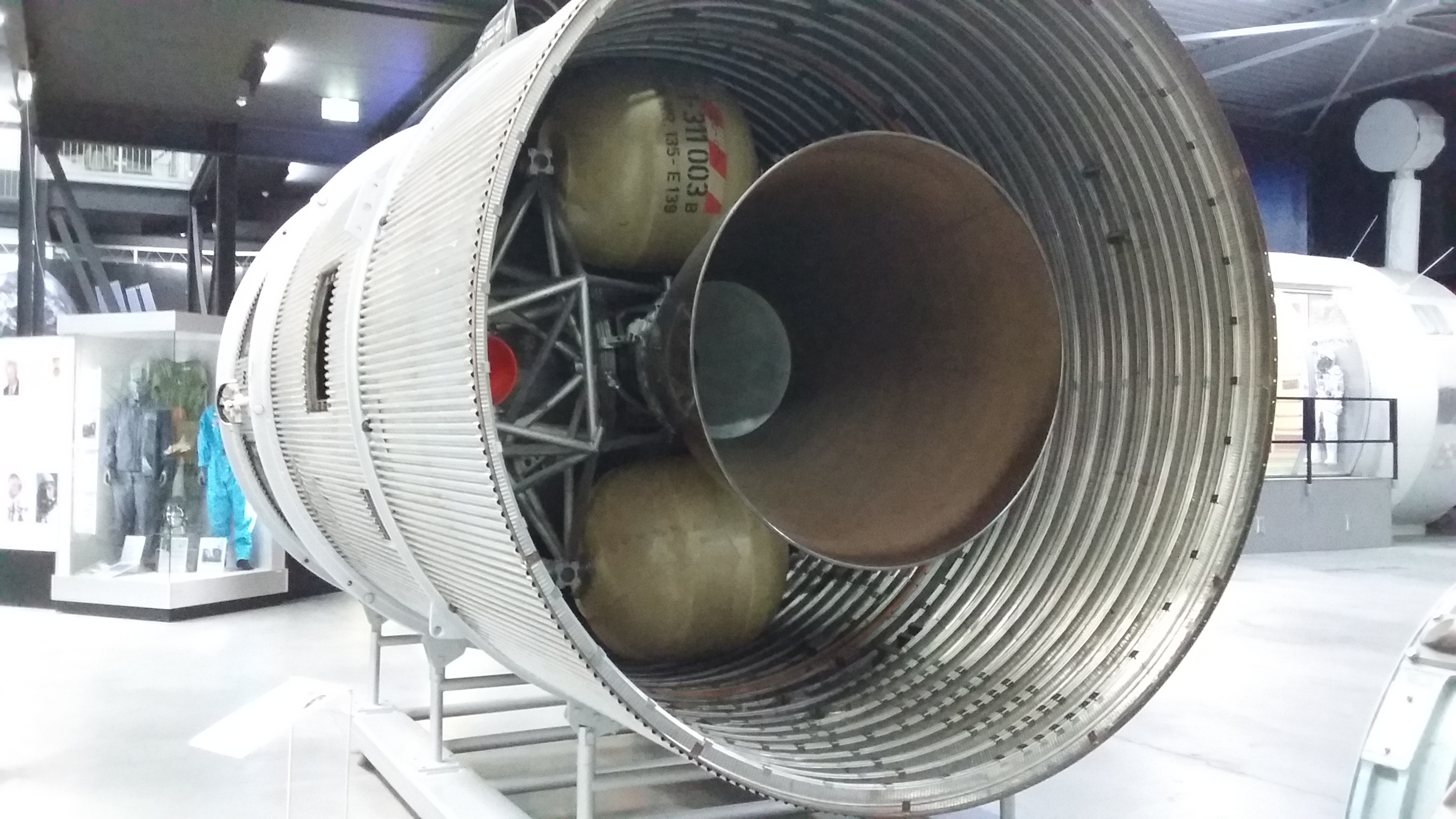
Astris bottom view

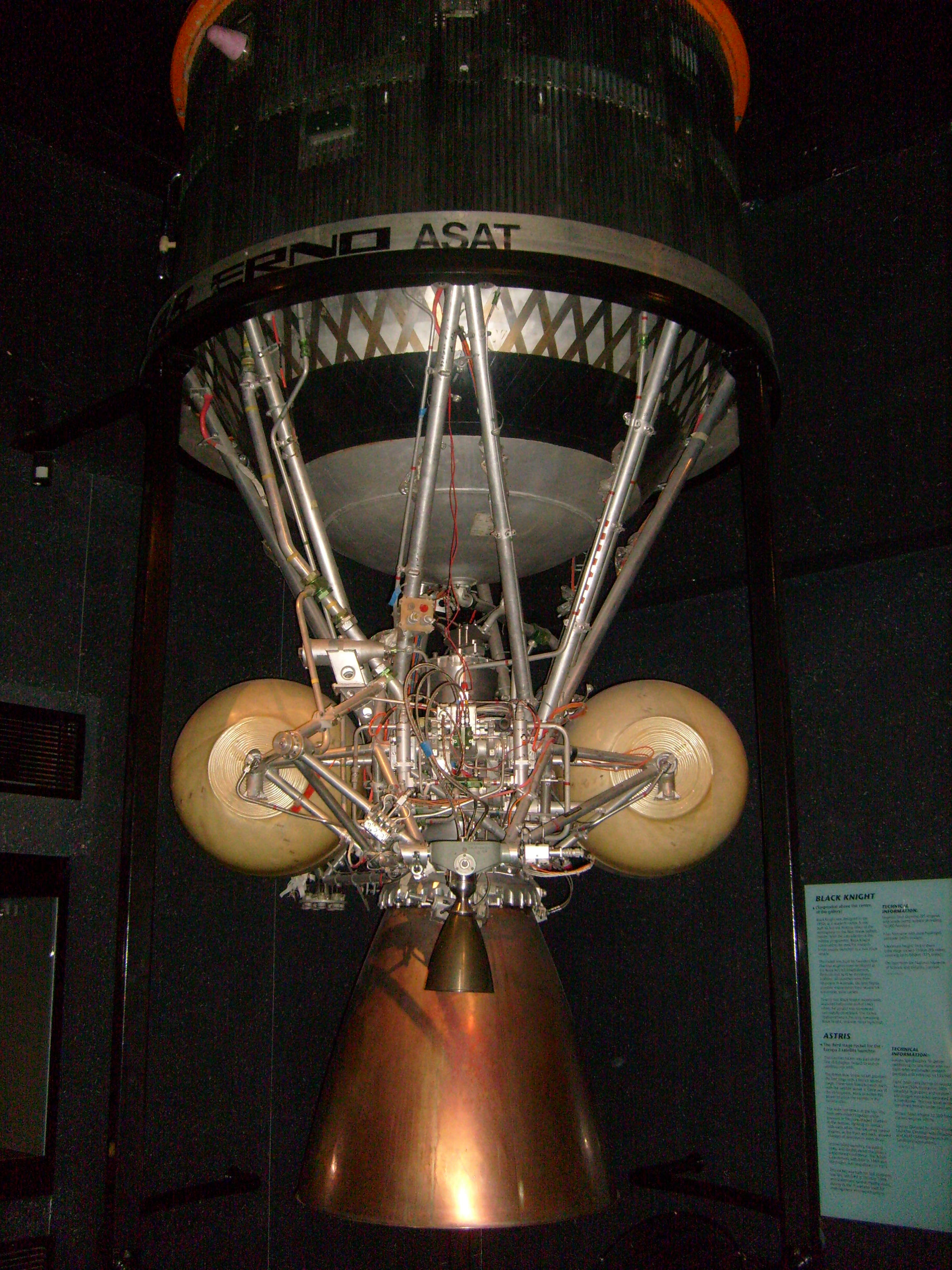
Astris engine

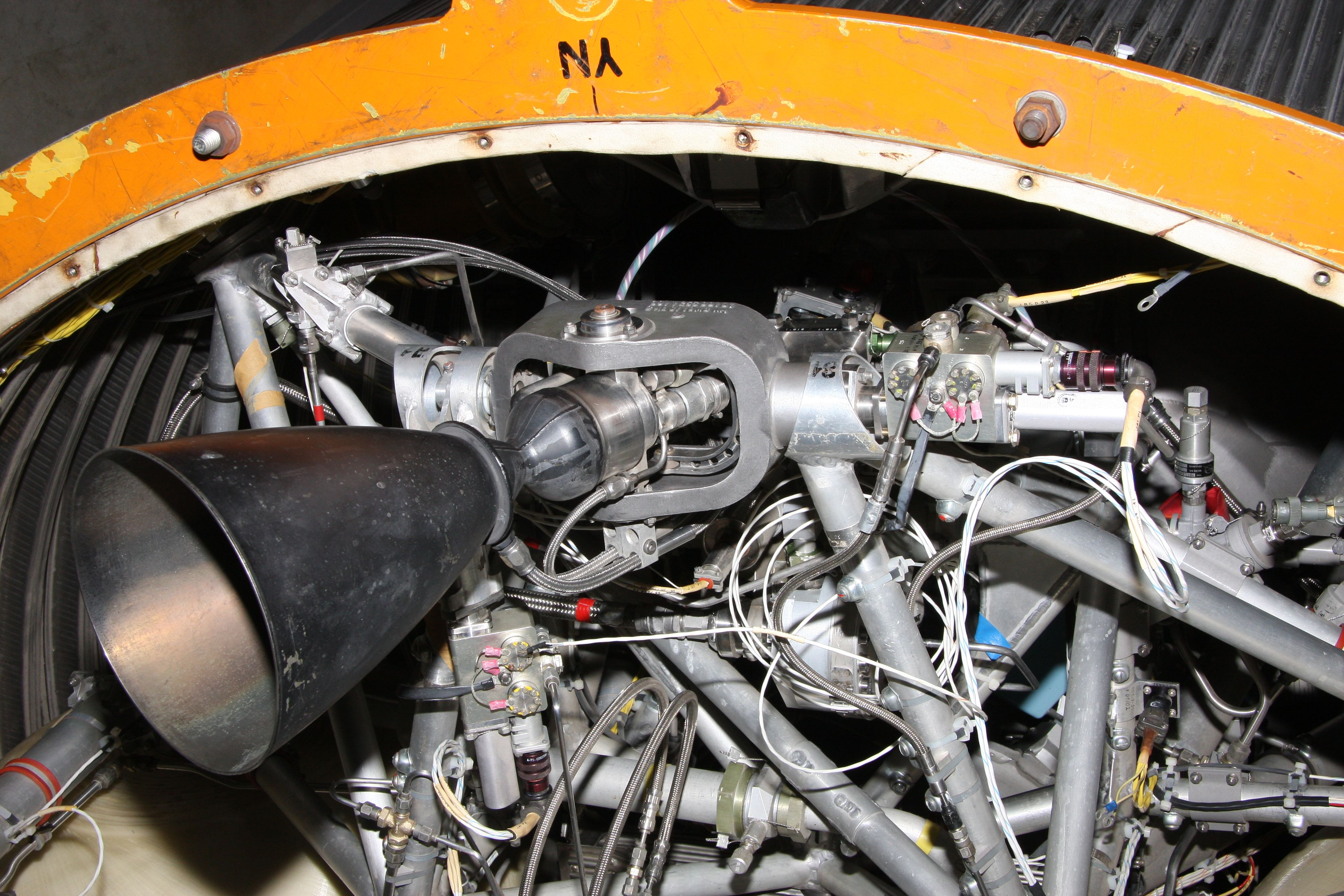
Astris vernier engines

=== Fourth stage (Europa II only) ===
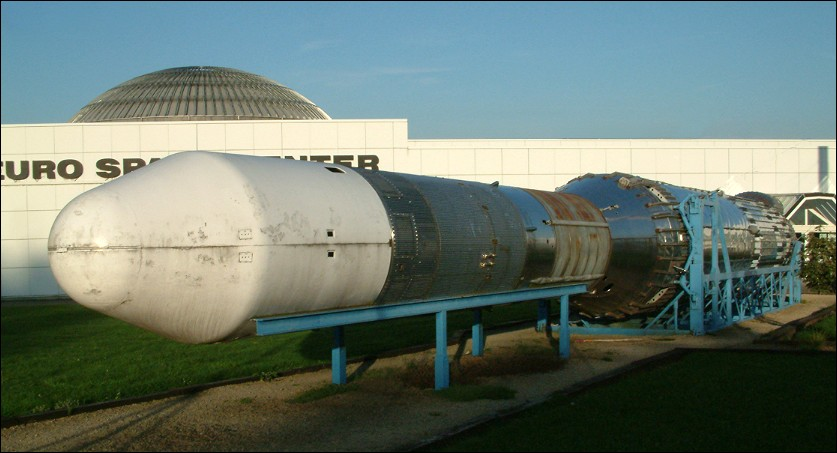
Europa II rocket, view of fairing and upper stages

This configuration added a fourth stage derived from the Diamant BP4 P-068 third stage, developing a thrust of 24 kN for 46 seconds.

== Operational history ==
The first test took place at 9:14 am local time on 5 June 1964 at Woomera. Thrust was terminated after 147 seconds, 6 seconds earlier than planned. The point of impact was 625 miles (1,006 km) from the launch site, instead of the intended 950 miles (1,530 km). It reached a height of 110 miles (180 km) and a maximum speed of 6,400 mph (10,300 km/h). Near space is considered to be around 60–70 miles (97–113 km). The craft's structure was built by Hawker Siddeley Dynamics and the rocket engine were the Rolls-Royce RZ.2. At this stage the French and German rocket stages were mere fibre-glass scale models.

The first full-size launch, weighing in total 104 tons, took place at Woomera on 24 May 1966, with dummy upper stages. Tests were conducted by Australia's Weapons Research Establishment and the French Laboratoire de Recherche en Balistique et Aérodynamique (based at Vernon). After two minutes and fifteen seconds, six seconds short of the planned flight, the rocket was destroyed because an impact predictor reported it to be veering west of the planned trajectory. However, the rocket was exactly on course and inaccurate readings had been picked up by a radar station 120 miles (190 km) away.

Two-stage testing was planned for June 1967. At 11:12 pm GMT on 29 November 1968, the first three-stage Europa 1 launcher failed to put a 550 pounds (250 kg) Italian satellite-model into orbit.

The first launch from French Guiana on 5 November 1971 was also the first launch of the four-stage Europa 2. It exploded over the Atlantic after three minutes. It landed in the sea 302 miles (486 km) from the launch site, and had reached a height of 40 miles (64 km).

Overall, the Europa programme had been heavily marred by technical problems. Although the first stage (the British Blue Streak) had launched successfully on each occasion, either the second or third stage would fail during every time, preventing a fully successful launch from being achieved. This disappointing performance heavily contributed to work on the programme being terminated.

== Europa rocket launches ==
List of Europa rocket launches:

Flight No.	Date	Model	Payload	Launch site	Outcome	Remarks
F1	5 June 1964	Blue Streak	-	Woomera	Success	Blue Streak IRBM test. The rocket became unstable due to uncontrollable oscillations during final phase of burn due to fuel sloshing in tanks. The flight was terminated a few seconds before planned engine cut-off. The vehicle broke up near the apogee of the flight. However, as the flight was meant as a test, it is classed as a "success".
F2	20 October 1964	Blue Streak	-	Woomera	Success	Blue Streak IRBM test.
F3	22 March 1965	Blue Streak	-	Woomera	Success	Blue Streak IRBM test.
F4	24 May 1966	Europa-1 (1 stage)	-	Woomera	Success	Europa first stage test (second and third stage mockups).
F5	15 November 1966	Europa-1 (1 stage)	-	Woomera	Success	Europa first stage test (second and third stage mockups).
F6.1	4 August 1967	Europa-1 (2 stage)	-	Woomera	2nd stage failed to ignite	Europa first and second stage test (third stage mockup).
F6.2	5 December 1967	Europa-1 (2 stage)	-	Woomera	2nd stage failed to separate	Europa first and second stage test (third stage mockup).
F7	30 November 1968	Europa 1	STV 1	Woomera	3rd stage failure after separation	First launch of the Europa rocket with all 3 stages and also 1st orbital launch of Europa.
F8	2 July 1969	Europa 1	STV 2	Woomera	3rd stage failure after separation	Europa three stage test.
F9	6 June 1970	Europa 1	STV 3	Woomera	Fairing failed to separate	Europa three stage test.
F11	5 November 1971	Europa 2	STV 4	Kourou	Guidance system failed	First and only launch of the Europa 2 configuration.
F12	-				Delivered to French Guiana	
F13	-				Delivered to National Museum of Flight, near Edinburgh	
F14	-				Delivered to Deutsches Museum, Munich	
F15	-				Delivered to Euro Space Center, Redu, Belgium	
F16	-				On display at NSC Leicester, on loan from Liverpool Museums	
F17	-				Only parts completed	
F18	-				Only parts completed	

== See also ==
- Cora (rocket), previous French rockets
- Ariane (rocket family), successor French-European rockets
