= Geoffrey Pardoe =

British aeronautical engineer

Geoffrey Keith Charles Pardoe OBE FREng FRAeS FBIS (2 November 1928 – 3 January 1996) was the project manager for the Blue Streak ballistic missile programme. He was also an advocate for British advanced science and technology, and involvement in space exploration, deploring (repeated) government negligence and its aborted technology programmes.

== Early life ==
He attended Wanstead County High School, a co-educational grammar school in Wanstead, east London. He attended and gained a BScEng from Loughborough of College of Technology (the college's degree was awarded by the University of London). He later gained a PhD in Astronautics from Loughborough University in 1984.

== Career ==
From 1949-1951 he was senior aerodynamicist at Armstrong Whitworth Aircraft, then part of Hawker Siddeley. He worked on rocket design and the Sea Slug (missile) (Britain's first guided missile). From 1951-19566 he was chief aerodynamicist at the Guided Weapons division of de Havilland Propellers, working on the De Havilland Firestreak. He worked on aerodynamics and flight analysis.

De Havilland was given the Blue Streak ballistic missile project, and he was the project manager from 1956-60. In 1959 he proposed a scheme known as Black Prince whereby a Blue Streak would be the main first stage, with the second stage a Black Knight, with a third stage a military solid rocket on top. It was also considered to have a Black Arrow as the second stage or third stage.

On 13 April 1960 the Blue Streak project was abruptly cancelled. He argued in September 1959 that the space vehicle could be transformed into the first stage of a European rocket launcher. He spoke fluent French and German. He found it difficult to forgive the British government when it withdrew from the European Launcher Development Organisation (ELDO) in 1968, with funding finishing in 1971. The government was paying £9 million a year to ELDO, which he argued was less than a few miles of motorway, and that leaving ELDO would keep Britain out of spaceflight forever, which was largely later proved correct (although work on satellites would continue). The French government would later massively support the Ariane project. By 1988 Ariane had around £2 billion worth of orders for flights. The earlier British rocket project was later referred to as the ill-fated Blue Streak, but it was only ill fated at the administrative level, not the technical.

De Havilland merged with Hawker Siddeley in 1960, and he was the chief engineer of Hawker Siddeley Dynamics Weapons and Space Research division from 1960 to 1963. From 1963 to 1969 he was chief project engineer of the company's Space Division. He was managing director from 1985 to 1987 and deputy chairman from 1987 to 1993 of Surrey Satellite Technology.

From 1993 until his death in 1996, he was director of the International Academy of Science. In 1986 he became chairman of the Watt Committee on Energy. From 1984 to 1985 he was president of the Royal Aeronautical Society. The RAeS has honoured him with the Geoffrey Pardoe Space Award.

=== British Space Development Company ===
In 1960 the British Space Development Company, a consortium of thirteen large industrial companies was set up, to plan the world's first commercial communication satellite company, by Robert Renwick, 1st Baron Renwick. He became the Executive Director. With Blue Streak, Britain had the technology to make it possible.

The idea was flatly turned down by the British government on the grounds that such a system could not be envisaged in the next 20 years (1961–81). America then set up COMSAT in 1963, resulting in Intelsat, the world's largest fleet (52) of commercial satellites. The first of Intelsat's fleet, Intelsat I (Early Bird) was launched in April 1965. Intelsat has been commercially very successful.

Private finance would have been available for the project, but the project was scuppered by not receiving government approval. Later in the mid-1980s he campaigned for a British space agency, as Britain was the only main Western country not to have one, even though the Chairman of the European Space Agency, from 1984-7, was Britain's Dr (later Professor) Harry Atkinson. The BNSC was formed in 1985.

=== General Technology Systems ===
He founded the consultancy General Technology Systems in Brentford in 1973, with a colleague from the Blue Streak project, Bill Stephens. It was later based at the Brunel Science Park at Brunel University in 1988. In the late 1980s GTS was developing an 80-foot satellite launcher called LittLEO, to carry 700 kg payloads into orbit from the Andøya Rocket Range launch site in Norway. The cost would be around £10,000 per kg. The company LittLEO Ltd was established. A first launch was planned for 1992. It would have been multi-staged with a solid fuel propellant.

=== Broadcasting ===
During the Apollo 11 mission to the Moon in 1969, he was part of the television commentary team with Reg Turnill. He was chosen for this role as he was a good communicator.

== Personal life ==
He married Patricia Gutteridge in 1953. They had a son and a daughter. He died of a heart attack aged 67 on a business visit to attend meetings at the International Academy of Science in Kansas City, Missouri.

He was made OBE in 1988, a Fellow of the Royal Aeronautical Society in 1968, and of the Royal Academy of Engineering in 1988.

== Publications ==
- The Future for Space Technology 17 May 1984, Frances Pinter (Thomson Learning), 192 pages, ISBN 0-86187-462-5

== See also ==
- British space programme

Professional and academic associations
Preceded by	President of the Royal Aeronautical Society; 1984-85	Succeeded by Thomas Kerr (engineer)
