= Astris (rocket stage) =

Upper rocket stage

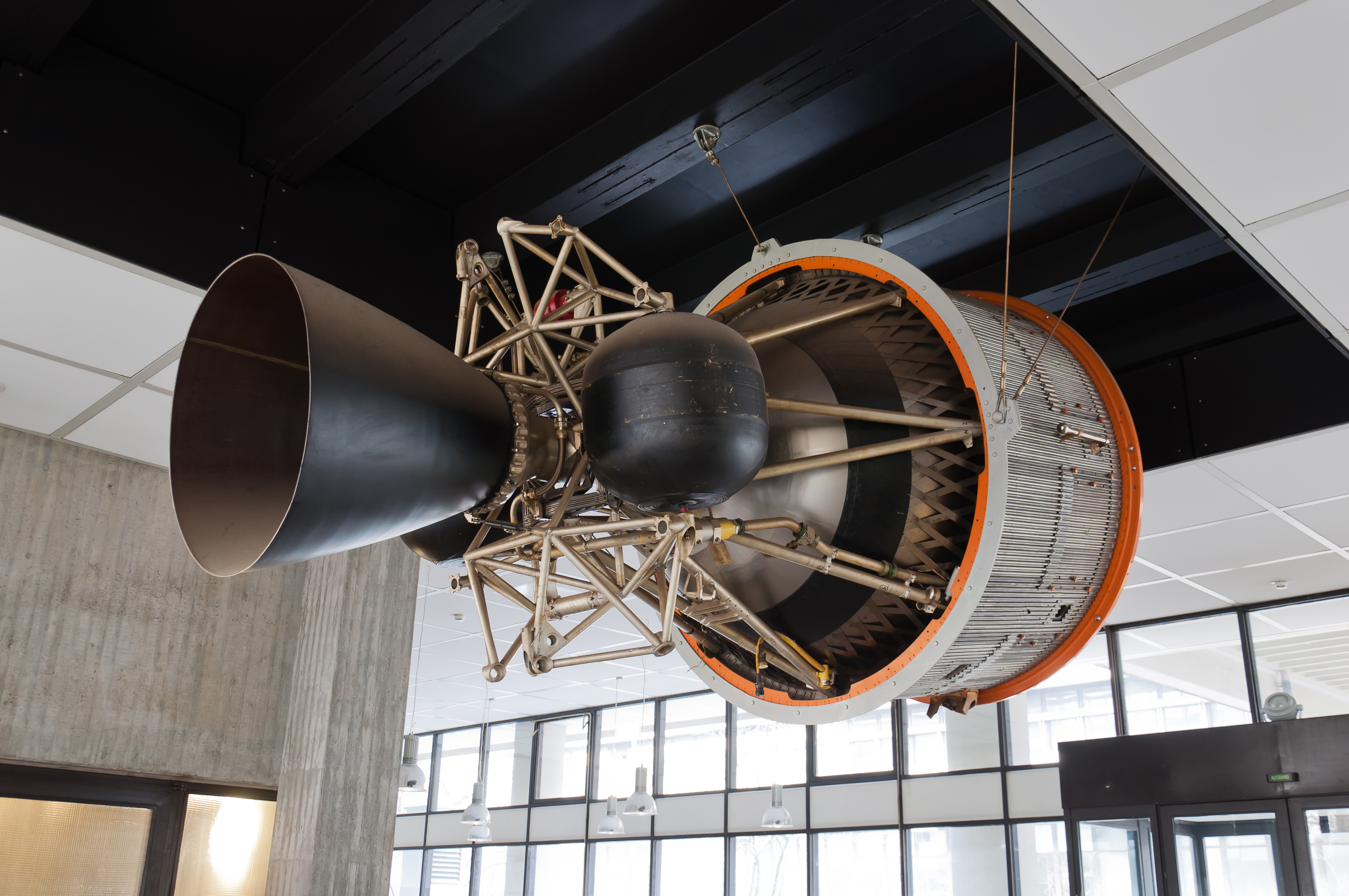
- Astris, the third (upper) stage of the Europa I rocket, on display in Pfaffenwaldring 31 (V 31) on the campus of University of Stuttgart in Vaihingen, Stuttgart, Germany.
- Manufacturer: ERNO Raumfahrttechnik GmbH
- Country of origin: Germany
- Used on: Europa 1 third stage.

General characteristics
- Height: 3.36 m (132 in)
- Diameter: 2.00 m (79 in)
- Gross mass: 3,370 kg (7,430 lb)
- Propellant mass: 2,760 kg (6,080 lb)
- Empty mass: 610 kg (1,340 lb)

Launch history
- Status: Retired
- Total launches: 4
- Successes (stage only): 0
- Failed: 4
- Lower stage failed: 0
- First flight: 1969-07-31
- Last flight: 1971-11-05

Engine details
- Powered by: 1 Astris (rocket engine)
- Maximum thrust: 23.3 kilonewtons (5,200 lbf)
- Specific impulse: 310 s (3.0 km/s)
- Burn time: 330s
- Propellant: Aerozine 50 / N_{2}O_{4}

The Astris was an upper stage developed by ERNO Raumfahrttechnik GmbH and MBB as the third stage of the Europa 1 launch vehicle. It was the German contribution to the project and only flew activated four times. The high failure rate of the three and four stage rocket meant that the project was cancelled.

On November 29, 1968, its inaugural flight, the Astris third stage exploded. On the second attempt in July 1969, the Astris engine failed to start. On the third attempt on June 11, 1970, the stage performed correctly, but the fairing failed to separate.

On November 5, 1971, the Europa II launched from CSG ELA-1, had a mishap due to structural failure of the third stage. After this last failure the project was definitely cancelled.

== Details ==
The stage measured 3.36 m with a diameter of 2 m, and had an empty mass of 610 kg. Propellant (N_{2}O_{4}/Aerozine-50) mass was 2760 kg, and the single Astris engine produced 23.3 kN of thrust.

== See also ==
- Astris (rocket engine)
- Europa (rocket)
- Viking (rocket engine)
