= Astris (rocket engine) =

Liquid rocket engine

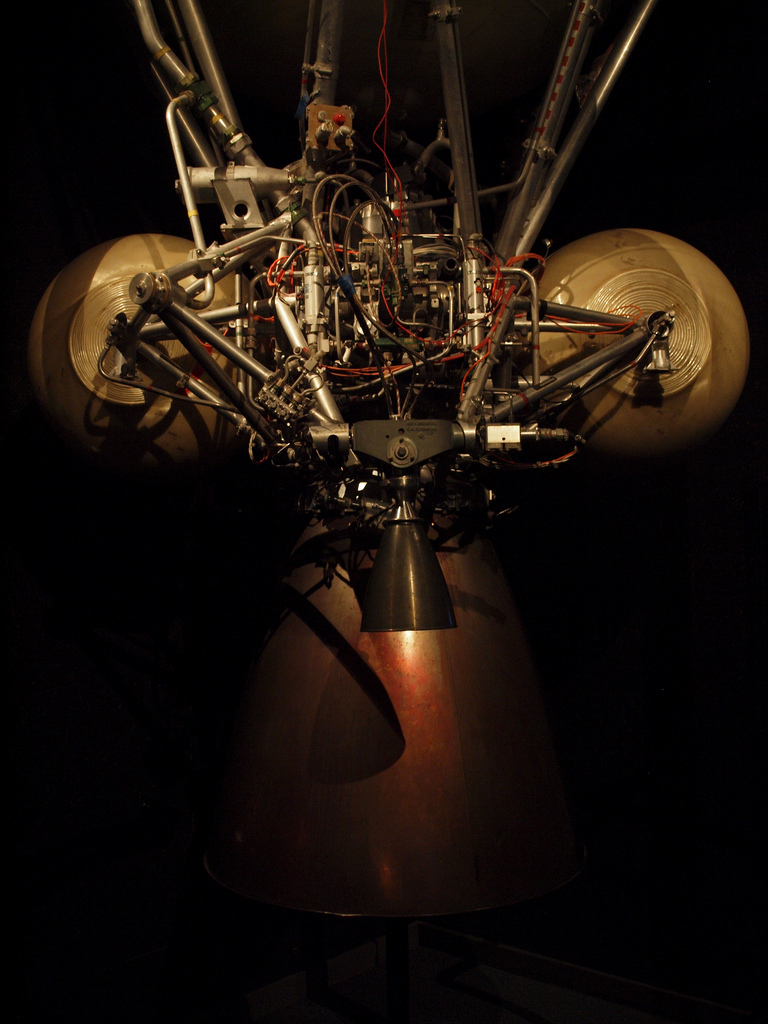
- The third stage rocket for the Europa II satellite launcher
- Country of origin: Germany
- First flight: 1969-07-31
- Last flight: 1971-11-05
- Designer: ERNO Raumfahrttechnik GmbH
- Manufacturer: Snecma
- Application: Upper stage engine
- Associated LV: Europa (rocket)
- Status: Retired

Liquid-fuel engine
- Propellant: N_{2}O_{4} / Aerozine 50
- Cycle: pressure fed

Configuration
- Chamber: 1

Performance
- Thrust, vacuum: 23.3 kilonewtons (5,200 lbf)
- Thrust, sea-level: 19.6 kilonewtons (4,400 lbf)
- Specific impulse, vacuum: 310 s (3.0 km/s)
- Specific impulse, sea-level: 260 s (2.5 km/s)
- Burn time: 330 seconds

Dimensions
- Dry mass: 68 kg (150 lb)

Used in
- Astris (rocket stage)

The Astris was a liquid rocket engine burning the hypergolic propellant combination of Aerozine 50 and N_{2}O_{4}. A single engine powered Astris third stage of the failed Europa rocket.

On November 29, 1968, its inaugural flight, the Astris third stage exploded. On the second attempt in July 1969, the Astris engine failed to start. On the third attempt on June 11, 1970, the stage performed correctly, but the fairing failed to separate. On November 5, 1971, the Europa II launched from CSG ELA-1, had a mishap due to structural failure of the third stage. After this last failure the project was definitely cancelled.

== See also ==
- Astris (rocket stage)
- Europa (rocket)
- Viking (rocket engine)
