= European Launcher Development Organisation =

Organization

Agency overview
- Abbreviation: ELDO
- Formed: 1962; 64 years ago
- Dissolved: 1975; 51 years ago
- Superseding agency: European Space Agency
- Type: Space agency
- Status: Merged with the European Space Research Organisation to become the European Space Agency
- Owners: Belgium; France; Italy; Netherlands; United Kingdom; West Germany; Australia (associate member)

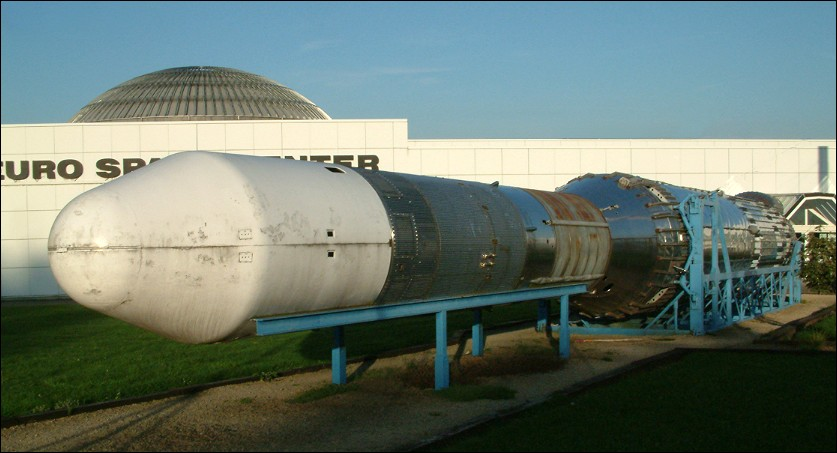
Europa II

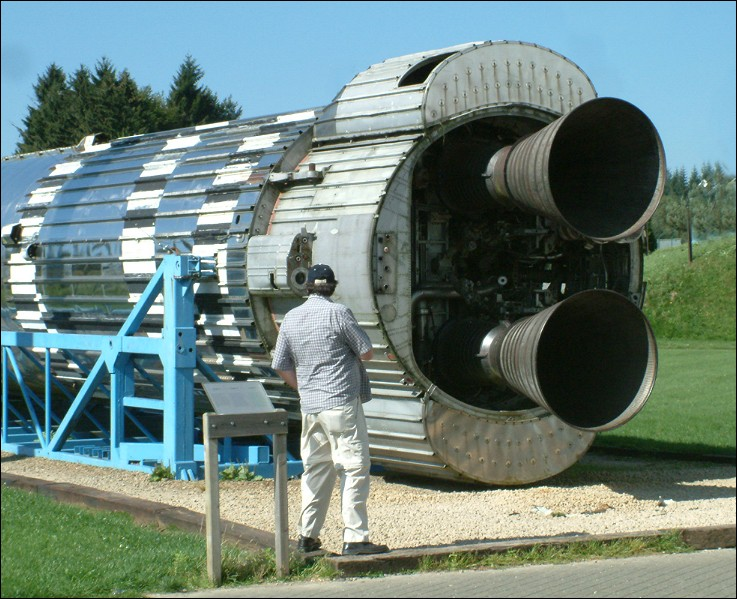
Rolls-Royce RZ-12

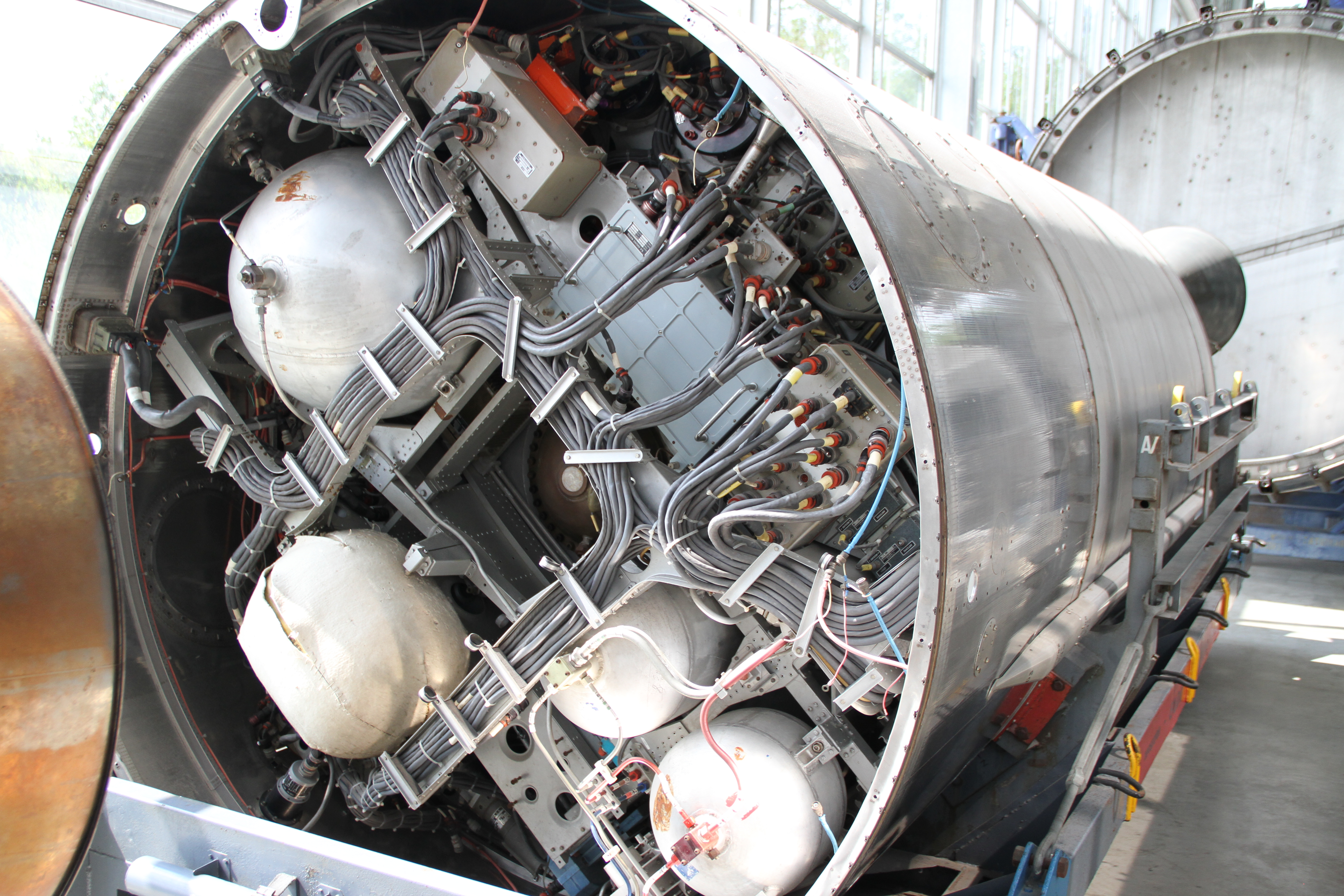
Coralie

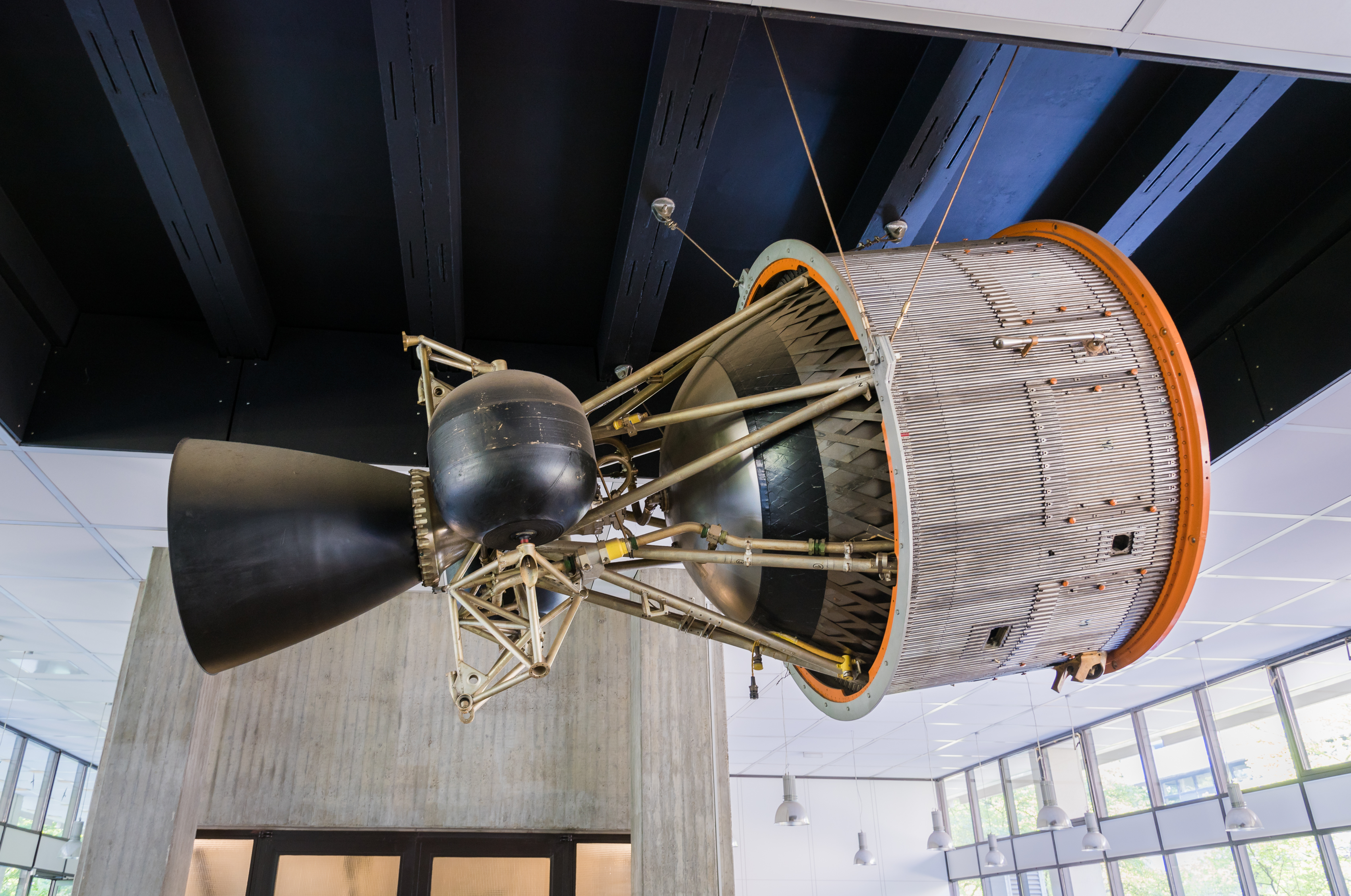
Astris

The European Launcher Development Organisation (ELDO) is a former European space research organisation. It was first developed in order to establish a satellite launch vehicle for Europe. The three-stage rocket developed was named Europa, after the mythical Greek goddess. Overall, there were 10 launches that occurred under ELDO's funding. The organisation consisted of Belgium, Britain, France, Germany, Italy, and the Netherlands. Australia was an associate member of the organisation.

Initially, the launch site was in Woomera, Australia, but was later moved to the French site Kourou, in French Guiana. The programme was created to replace the Blue Streak Missile Programme after its cancellation in 1960. In 1974, after an unsuccessful satellite launch, the programme was merged with the European Space Research Organisation to form the European Space Agency.

== Origins ==
After the failure to launch Britain's Blue Streak Missile, Britain wished to use its finished space launch parts in order to cut losses. In 1961, Britain and France announced that they would be working together on a launcher that would be capable of sending a one-ton satellite into space. This cooperation was later drafted into the Convention of the European Launcher Development Organisation, which Italy, Belgium, West Germany, the Netherlands and Australia would join. Australia provided a sparsely populated site for missile launcher testing and development at Woomera, South Australia. The original intent of this organisation was to develop a space programme exclusively for Europe, excluding the UN or any outside country.

== History ==
The initial plans for the rocket were proposed in 1962. The rocket created was called the ELDO-A, later renamed Europa-1. It measured 31.7 m (104 ft) in length and weighed more than 110 tons. Europa-1 was planned to put a payload of 1,000 kg (2,200 lb)–1,200 kg (2,600 lb) into a 500 km (310 mi) circular orbit above earth. The three stages consisted of the Blue Streak stage, the French Coralie stage, and the German stage. The first stage, the Blue Streak stage, was to fire for 160 seconds after launch. The second stage, the French Coralie stage, fired for the following 103 seconds. The third and final stage, the German stage, fired for an extra 361 seconds to launch the rocket into Earth's lower orbit. The first stage was a development of Blue Streak and was built in Stevenage, Hertfordshire U.K.

In June 1964, the first stage, F1, had its first launch at Woomera, South Australia. By the middle of 1966, ELDO decided to change Europa-1 from a three-stage launcher into a four-stage launcher that was capable of placing a satellite into geostationary transfer orbit. Following this decision, in 1969, many unsuccessful launches of Europa-1 and the resignation of Britain and Italy prompted a reconsideration of ideas. In 1970, ELDO was forced to cancel the Europa-1 programme.

By late 1970, the plans for Europa-2 were created. Europa-2 was a similarly designed rocket with an extra stage added in. The funding for Europa-2 was supplied 90% by France and Germany. On November 5, 1971, Europa-2 was launched for the first time, but unsuccessfully. The failure of the rocket led to the consideration of a Europa-3 rocket design. However, Europa-3 was never created and the lack of funding prompted the merging of the European Launcher Development Organisation and the European Space Research Organisation to form the European Space Agency.

=== Australian downrange tracker ===
The Gove Down Range Guidance and Telemetry Station was built at Gulkula on the Gove Peninsula in the Northern Territory of Australia in the 1960s, to track the downrange path of rockets launched from the RAAF Woomera Range Complex in South Australia, with its state-of-the-art technology operated by mainly Belgian scientists. The satellite tracker was moved back up to the Gove Peninsula in September 2020 by the local historical society, after spending years in storage at Woomera.

== Launches ==
Overall, the European Launcher Development Organisation planned eleven launches, only ten of which actually occurred. Of the nine actual launches, four were successful. Four other launches were unsuccessful and there was one launch that was terminated. The first launch, F-1, occurred on 5 June 1964 which tested only the first stage of the launch and was successful. Both F-2 and F-3, which occurred on 20 October 1964 and 22 March 1965 on their respective dates tested only the first stage once again and were both successful. The fourth launch, F-4, occurred on 24 May 1966. This launch tested only the first stage of the rocket with a dummy stage 2 and 3. This flight was terminated 136 seconds into flight. The fifth launch, F-5, took place on 13 November 1966. This launch aimed to complete the same task as F-4 and was successful. The sixth launch, F-6/1, took place on 4 August 1967. This launch had an active first and second stage with a dummy third stage and satellite. On this launch, the second stage did not ignite and was unsuccessful. The seventh launch, F-6/2, took place on 5 December 1967. It aimed to do the same objective as F-6/1, but the first and second stages did not separate. The eighth launch, F-7, took place on 30 November 1968. On this launch, all three stages were active and a satellite was fitted. After the second stage ignited, the third stage exploded. The ninth launch, F-8, occurred on 3 July 1969 and aimed to do the same thing as F-7, but ended the same way. The tenth launch, F-9, occurred on 12 June 1970 and had all stages active with a satellite fitted. In this launch, all stages were successful, yet the satellite failed to orbit. After this launch, ELDO began losing funds and members and was eventually phased into the ESRO to create the ESA.

After F-10 was cancelled, it was decided that Woomera launch site was not suitable for putting satellites into geosynchronous orbit. In 1966, it was decided to move to the French site of Kourou in South America. France planned to launch F-11, on which Europa-2 launched off into the sky. However, thanks to the static discharge from the fairings travelling down to the third stage sequencer and inertial navigation computer, they cause it to hang and malfunction; signalling the range safety officer to destroy it. The launch of F12 was postponed whilst a project review was carried out, which led to the decision to abandon the Europa design.
