= Matus Bisnovat =

Soviet aircraft and missile designer

- Born: 23 October 1905; Nikopol, Russian Empire
- Died: 8 November 1977 (aged 69); Moscow, Soviet Union

Matus Ruvimovich Bisnovat (Russian: Матус Рувимович Бисноват; 23 October 1905 in Nikopol – 8 November 1977) was a Soviet aircraft and missile designer. Bisnovat attended the Moscow Aviation Institute (MAI), graduating in 1931. In 1938, he headed a research team in Central Aero-Hydrodynamics Institute TsAGI, Zhukovsky, where several high-speed experimental airplanes were developed, the SK-1, SK-2 and SK-3.

From 1942 - 1944 Bisnovat oversaw the development of the "302" rocket/ramjet fighter in NII-3, supervised by Andrey Kostikov. In 1946 he became head of Plant no. 293 and a team of engineers formerly in the OKB-293 of Viktor Bolkhovitinov. There Bisnovat managed some later work on the Bereznyak-Isaev BI-1 Rocket-powered aircraft. In 1948, with engine designer Aleksei Isaev he worked on the supersonic aircraft "Bisnovat 5". In 1952 he developed the infrared homing air-to-air missile SNARS-250.

Bisnovat fell prey to a 1953 antisemitic campaign against "cosmopolitanism" instigated by rivals of Lavrentiy Beria. As a result he was ousted as head of Plant 293.

In 1954 Bisnovat became head of design bureau KB Molniya, where he oversaw the development of air-to-air missiles R-40, R-60 and R-73.

Bisnovat was awarded a doctorate in science in 1965.

He died in 1977 from complications due to diabetes.

== Honours and awards ==
- Hero of Socialist Labour (including an Order of Lenin) and the gold medal "Hammer and Sickle" - For his great services to create new types of aircraft armament, and in connection with the 70th anniversary of the Presidium of the Supreme Soviet of the USSR in October 1975
- Two Orders of Lenin
- Order of the Red Banner of Labour
- Lenin Prize (1966)
- USSR State Prize (1973)
