= Mikoyan-Gurevich I-270 =

Soviet fighter aircraft

I-270
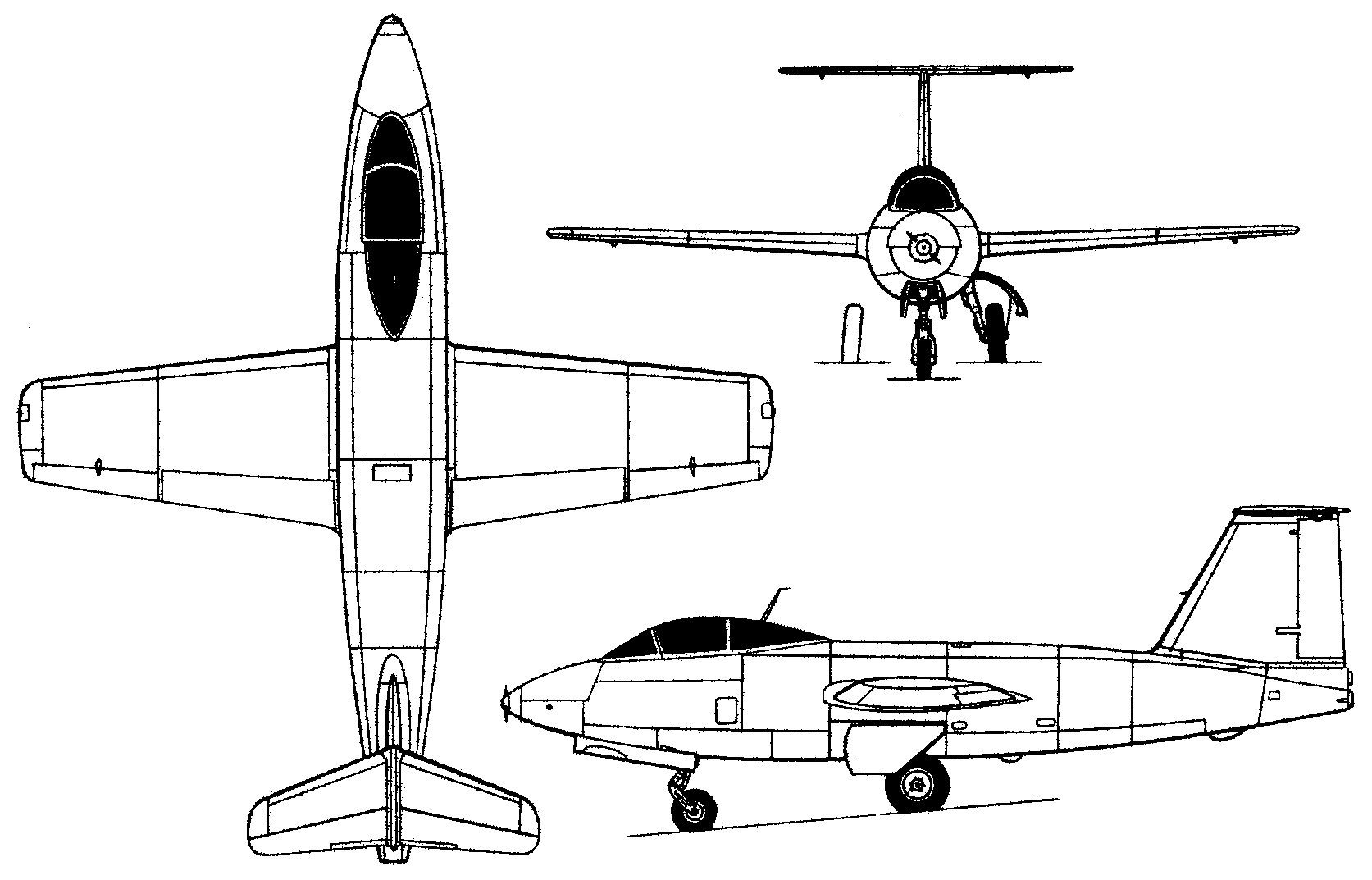

General information
- Type: Interceptor aircraft
- National origin: Soviet Union
- Manufacturer: Mikoyan-Gurevich
- Status: Cancelled
- Primary user: Soviet Air Forces
- Number built: 2

History
- First flight: December 1946 (unpowered)

The Mikoyan-Gurevich I-270 (Design Ж ("Zh") under Mikoyan-Gurevich's in-house designation sequence, USAF/DoD designation: Type 11) was a response to a Soviet Air Forces requirement in 1945 for a rocket-powered interceptor aircraft for the point-defence role. In concept and basic configuration, it was related to the early Korolyov RP-318 rocket-powered aircraft which was developed in 1936 and first flew February 20, 1940, and the more recent Bereznyak-Isayev BI-1 Soviet design. Only two prototypes were built, both of which were destroyed in crashes, leading to the cancellation of the project.

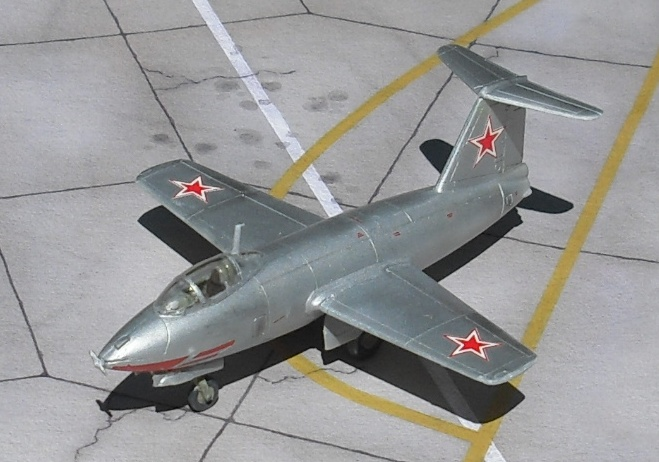
Model of I-270

== Flights ==
In the early stages of World War II (1942), a complete prototype BI-1 (also known as The Devil's Broomstick), made its first several flights. The I-270 shared the BI-1's simple, tapered fuselage, bubble canopy, wing design, and dual-chambered bipropellant rocket motor. On the other hand, it was considerably larger than the BI-1 and featured short, reinforced wings (from the RP-218) and a raised T-tail which aircraft such as the Tupolev ANT-8 proved, offered better landing control than the BI-1's more traditional fighter layout. While there seems little doubt that the BI-1 influenced the design of the I-270, the latter appears far from a direct descendant of the former, and much closer to being a Soviet version of the Me 263, sharing very similar fuselage, canopy and landing gear layouts, while adding a conventional stabilizer surface atop the vertical tail, absent on the German design.

The Soviet tradition of rocketry, starting from the early work of Konstantin Tsiolkovsky and carried through by men like Sergei Korolev, made rocket fighters a reality. The RD-2M engine, designed by Leonid Dushkin was the dual-combustion chamber version of the engine used for the 1941 BI-1 rocket plane. That in turn had followed from a tradition dating back to Sergey Korolev's work on project "06" in the early 1930s and the RP-318 rocket plane designed in 1936.

The first gliding trials commenced in December 1946, with the first prototype towed into the air behind a Tupolev Tu-2, ballast-loaded in place of an engine. The second prototype began powered tests early in 1947, but was damaged beyond repair making a hard landing. Shortly afterwards, the first prototype was also destroyed in a landing accident. By this stage, turbojet technology was at a far more advanced stage than it had been at the outset of the project, and surface-to-air missiles had replaced the need for point-defence interceptors. Under these circumstances, the Air Force decided to cancel the project.

== Operators ==
Soviet Union

- Soviet Air Forces

== Specifications (I-270) ==
Data from Soviet Rocket Fighters, MiG: Fifty Years of Secret Aircraft Design

General characteristics

- Crew: 1
- Length: 8.915 m (29 ft 3 in)
- Wingspan: 7.75 m (25 ft 5 in)
- Height: 2.8 m (9 ft 2 in)
- Wing area: 12 m^{2} (130 sq ft)
- Airfoil: root: TsAGI-12145; tip: TsAGI-1S012
- Empty weight: 1,564 kg (3,448 lb)
- Gross weight: 2,556 kg (5,635 lb)
- Max takeoff weight: 4,121 kg (9,085 lb)
- Fuel capacity: 2,120 kg (4,670 lb) (also quoted as 2,150 kg (4,740 lb)) - 1,620 kg (3,570 lb) RFNA oxidiser in four tanks, 440 kg (970 lb) kerosene fuel in a single tank with seven tanks for 80% hydrogen peroxide (H_{2}O_{2}) to generate steam to run turbopumps.
- Powerplant: 1 × Dushkin-Glushko RD-2M-3V liquid-fuelled rocket engine, 14.22 kN (3,197 lbf) thrust for take-off

15.06 kN (3,385 lbf) at 5,000 m (16,000 ft)
15.50 kN (3,484 lbf) at 10,000 m (33,000 ft)
15.60 kN (3,506 lbf) at 15,000 m (49,000 ft)

Performance

- Maximum speed: 1,000 km/h (620 mph, 540 kn) , Mach0.815 at sea level

990 km/h (620 mph; 530 kn), Mach0.86 at 5,000 m (16,000 ft)
928 km/h (577 mph; 501 kn), Mach0.87 at 10,000 m (33,000 ft)
925 km/h (575 mph; 499 kn), Mach0.87 at 11,000 m (36,000 ft)
936 km/h (582 mph; 505 kn), Mach0.88 at 15,000 m (49,000 ft)

- Landing speed: 137 km/h (85 mph; 74 kn) flaps extended

156.5 km/h (97.2 mph; 84.5 kn) flaps retracted

- Endurance: at 15,000 m (49,000 ft)

with both chambers ignited 4 minutes 8.4 seconds
with one chamber ignited 4 minutes 53.4 seconds

- Service ceiling: 17,970 m (58,960 ft) (some sources 17,000 m (56,000 ft)
- Time to altitude: 5,000 m (16,000 ft) in 88.5 seconds

10,000 m (33,000 ft) in 144 seconds
11,000 m (36,000 ft) in 150.4 seconds
15,000 m (49,000 ft) in 181.25 seconds

- Wing loading: 344 kg/m^{2} (70 lb/sq ft)
- Take-off run: 895 m (2,936 ft)
- Landing run: 493 m (1,617 ft) (some sources 956 m (3,136 ft))

Armament

- Guns: 2 × 23 mm (0.906 in) Nudelman-Suranov NS-23 autocannon with 40 rpg (some sources 50 rpg)

Avionics

- PKI-1 collimator gunsight
- RPKO-10 (or RPKO-10M) ADF
- RSI-6 radio
- IFF
- KP14 Oxygen unit
- FSI-6M

== See also ==
Aircraft of comparable role, configuration, and era

- Bereznyak-Isayev BI-1 (1932–1945 project)
- Messerschmitt Me 263
