= Plasma stealth =

Proposed aircraft stealth technology

Plasma stealth is a proposed process to use ionized gas (plasma) to reduce the radar cross-section (RCS) of an aircraft. Interactions between electromagnetic radiation and ionized gas have been extensively studied for many purposes, including concealing aircraft from radar as stealth technology. Various methods might plausibly be able to form a layer or cloud of plasma around a vehicle to deflect or absorb radar, from simpler electrostatic or radio frequency discharges to more complex laser discharges. It is theoretically possible to reduce RCS in this way, but it may be very difficult to do so in practice. Some Russian missiles e.g. the 3M22 Zircon (SS-N-33) and Kh-47M2 Kinzhal missiles have been reported to make use of plasma stealth.

== First claims ==
In 1956, Arnold Eldredge, of General Electric, filed a patent application for an "Object Camouflage Method and Apparatus," which proposed using a particle accelerator in an aircraft to create a cloud of ionization that would "...refract or absorb incident radar beams." It is unclear who funded this work or whether it was prototyped and tested. U.S. Patent 3,127,608 was granted in 1964.

During Project OXCART, the operation of the Lockheed A-12 reconnaissance aircraft, the CIA funded an attempt to reduce the RCS of the A-12's inlet cones. Known as Project KEMPSTER, this used an electron beam generator to create a cloud of ionization in front of each inlet. The system was flight tested but was never deployed on operational A-12s or SR-71s. The A-12 also had the capability to use a cesium-based fuel additive called "A-50" to ionize the exhaust gases, thus blocking radar waves from reflecting off the aft quadrant and engine exhaust pipes. Cesium was used because it was easily ionized by the hot exhaust gases. Radar physicist Ed Lovick Jr. claimed this additive saved the A-12 program.

In 1992, Hughes Research Laboratory conducted a research project to study electromagnetic wave propagation in unmagnetized plasma. A series of high voltage spark gaps were used to generate UV radiation, which creates plasma via photoionization in a waveguide. Plasma filled missile radomes were tested in an anechoic chamber for attenuation of reflection. At about the same time, R. J. Vidmar studied the use of atmospheric pressure plasma as electromagnetic reflectors and absorbers. Other investigators also studied the case of a non-uniform magnetized plasma slab.

Despite the apparent technical difficulty of designing a plasma stealth device for combat aircraft, there are claims that a system was offered for export by Russia in 1999. In January 1999, the Russian ITAR-TASS news agency published an interview with Doctor Anatoliy Koroteyev, the director of the Keldysh Research Center (FKA Scientific Research Institute for Thermal Processes), who talked about the plasma stealth device developed by his organization. The claim was particularly interesting in light of the solid scientific reputation of Dr. Koroteyev and the Institute for Thermal Processes, which is one of the top scientific research organizations in the world in the field of fundamental physics.

The Journal of Electronic Defense reported that "plasma-cloud-generation technology for stealth applications" developed in Russia reduces an aircraft's RCS by a factor of 100 (20 dB). According to this June 2002 article, the Russian plasma stealth device has been tested aboard a Sukhoi Su-27IB fighter-bomber. The Journal also reported that similar research into applications of plasma for RCS reduction is being carried out by Accurate Automation Corporation (Chattanooga, Tennessee) and Old Dominion University (Norfolk, Virginia) in the U.S.; and by Dassault Aviation (Saint-Cloud, France) and Thales (Paris, France).

== Plasma and its properties ==
A plasma is a quasineutral (total electrical charge is close to zero) mix of ions (atoms which have been ionized, and therefore possess a net positive charge), electrons, and neutral particles (un-ionized atoms or molecules). Most plasmas are only partially ionized, in fact, the ionization degree of common plasma devices like fluorescent lamp is fairly low ( less than 1%). Almost all the matter in the universe is very low density plasma: solids, liquids and gases are uncommon away from planetary bodies. Plasmas have many technological applications, from fluorescent lighting to plasma processing for semiconductor manufacture.

Plasmas can interact strongly with electromagnetic radiation: this is why plasmas might plausibly be used to modify an object's radar signature. Interaction between plasma and electromagnetic radiation is strongly dependent on the physical properties and parameters of the plasma, most notably the electron temperature and plasma density.

- Characteristic electron plasma frequency, the frequency with which electrons oscillate (plasma oscillation):

$$\omega_{pe} = (4\pi n_ee^2/m_e)^{1/2} = 5.64 \times 10^4 n_e^{1/2} \mbox{rad/s} = 9000 \times n_e^{1/2} \mbox{Hz}$$

Plasmas can have a wide range of values in both temperature and density; plasma temperatures range from close to absolute zero and to well beyond 10^{9} kelvins (for comparison, tungsten melts at 3700 kelvins), and plasma may contain less than one particle per cubic metre. Electron temperature is usually expressed as electronvolt (eV), and 1 eV is equivalent to 11,604 K. Common plasmas temperature and density in fluorescent light tubes and semiconductor manufacturing processes are around several eV and 10^{9-12}per cm^{3}. For a wide range of parameters and frequencies, plasma is electrically conductive, and its response to low-frequency electromagnetic waves is similar to that of a metal: a plasma simply reflects incident low-frequency radiation. Low-frequency means it is lower than the characteristic electron plasma frequency. The use of plasmas to control the reflected electromagnetic radiation from an object (Plasma stealth) is feasible at suitable frequency where the conductivity of the plasma allows it to interact strongly with the incoming radio wave, and the wave can either be absorbed and converted into thermal energy, or reflected, or transmitted depending on the relationship between the radio wave frequency and the characteristic plasma frequency. If the frequency of the radio wave is lower than the plasma frequency, it is reflected. if it is higher, it is transmitted. If these two are equal, then resonance occurs. There is also another mechanism where reflection can be reduced. If the electromagnetic wave passes through the plasma, and is reflected by the metal, and the reflected wave and incoming wave are roughly equal in power, then they may form two phasors. When these two phasors are of opposite phase they can cancel each other out. In order to obtain substantial attenuation of radar signal, the plasma slab needs adequate thickness and density.

Plasmas support a wide range of waves, but for unmagnetised plasmas, the most relevant are the Langmuir waves, corresponding to a dynamic compression of the electrons. For magnetised plasmas, many different wave modes can be excited which might interact with radiation at radar frequencies.

== Absorption of EM radiation ==
When electromagnetic waves, such as radar signals, propagate into a conductive plasma, ions and electrons are displaced as a result of the time varying electric and magnetic fields. The wave field gives energy to the particles. The particles generally return some fraction of the energy they have gained to the wave, but some energy may be permanently absorbed as heat by processes like scattering or resonant acceleration, or transferred into other wave types by mode conversion or nonlinear effects. A plasma can, at least in principle, absorb all the energy in an incoming wave, and this is the key to plasma stealth. However, plasma stealth implies a substantial reduction of an aircraft's RCS, making it more difficult (but not necessarily impossible) to detect. The mere fact of detection of an aircraft by a radar does not guarantee an accurate targeting solution needed to intercept the aircraft or to engage it with missiles. A reduction in RCS also results in a proportional reduction in detection range, allowing an aircraft to get closer to the radar before being detected.

The central issue here is frequency of the incoming signal. A plasma will simply reflect radio waves below a certain frequency (characteristic electron plasma frequency). This is the basic principle of short wave radios and long-range communications, because low-frequency radio signals bounce between the Earth and the ionosphere and may therefore travel long distances. Early-warning over-the-horizon radars utilize such low-frequency radio waves (typically lower than 50 MHz). Most military airborne and air defense radars, however, operate in VHF, UHF, and microwave band, which have frequencies higher than the characteristic plasma frequency of ionosphere, therefore microwave can penetrate the ionosphere and communication between the ground and communication satellites demonstrates is possible. (Some frequencies can penetrate the ionosphere).

Plasma surrounding an aircraft might be able to absorb incoming radiation, and therefore reduces signal reflection from the metal parts of the aircraft: the aircraft would then be effectively invisible to radar at long range due to weak signals received. A plasma might also be used to modify the reflected waves to confuse the opponent's radar system: for example, frequency-shifting the reflected radiation would frustrate Doppler filtering and might make the reflected radiation more difficult to distinguish from noise.

Control of plasma properties like density and temperature is important for a functioning plasma stealth device, and it may be necessary to dynamically adjust the plasma density, temperature, or combinations, or the magnetic field, in order to effectively defeat different types of radar systems. The great advantage Plasma Stealth possesses over traditional radio frequency stealth techniques like low-observability geometry and use of radar-absorbent materials is that plasma is tunable and wideband. When faced with frequency hopping radar, it is possible, at least in principle, to change the plasma temperature and density to deal with the situation. The greatest challenge is to generate a large area or volume of plasma with good energy efficiency.

Plasma stealth technology also faces various technical problems. For example, the plasma itself emits EM radiation, although it is usually weak and noise-like in spectrum. Also, it takes some time for plasma to be re-absorbed by the atmosphere and a trail of ionized air would be created behind the moving aircraft, but at present there is no method to detect this kind of plasma trail at long distance. Thirdly, plasmas (like glow discharges or fluorescent lights) tend to emit a visible glow: this is not compatible with overall low observability concept. Last but not least, it is extremely difficult to produce a radar-absorbent plasma around an entire aircraft traveling at high speed, the electrical power needed is tremendous. However, a substantial reduction of an aircraft's RCS may be still be achieved by generating radar-absorbent plasma around the most reflective surfaces of the aircraft, such as the turbojet engine fan blades, engine air intakes, vertical stabilizers, and airborne radar antenna.

There have been several computational studies on plasma-based radar cross section reduction technique using three-dimensional finite-difference time-domain simulations. Chung studied the radar cross change of a metal cone when it is covered with plasma, a phenomenon that occurs during reentry into the atmosphere. Chung simulated the radar cross section of a generic satellite, and also the radar cross section when it is covered with artificially generated plasma cones.

== Theoretical work with Sputnik ==
Due to the obvious military applications of the subject, there are few readily available experimental studies of plasma's effect on the radar cross section (RCS) of aircraft, but plasma interaction with microwaves is a well explored area of general plasma physics. Standard plasma physics reference texts are a good starting point and usually spend some time discussing wave propagation in plasmas.

One of the most interesting articles related to the effect of plasma on the RCS of aircraft was published in 1963 by the IEEE. The article is entitled "Radar cross sections of dielectric or plasma coated conducting spheres and circular cylinders" (IEEE Transactions on Antennas and Propagation, September 1963, pp. 558–569). Six years earlier, in 1957, the Soviets had launched the first artificial satellite. While trying to track Sputnik it was noticed that its electromagnetic scattering properties were different from what was expected for a conductive sphere. This was due to the satellite's traveling inside of a plasma shell: the ionosphere.

The Sputnik's simple shape serves as an ideal illustration of plasma's effect on the RCS of an aircraft. Naturally, an aircraft would have a far more elaborate shape and be made of a greater variety of materials, but the basic effect should remain the same. In the case of the Sputnik flying through the ionosphere at high velocity and surrounded by a naturally occurring plasma shell, there are two separate radar reflections: the first from the conductive surface of the satellite, and the second from the dielectric plasma shell.

The authors of the paper found that a dielectric (plasma) shell may either decrease or increase the echo area of the object. If either one of the two reflections is considerably greater, then the weaker reflection will not contribute much to the overall effect. The authors also stated that the EM signal that penetrates the plasma shell and reflects off the object's surface will drop in intensity while traveling through plasma, as was explained in the prior section.

The most interesting effect is observed when the two reflections are of the same order of magnitude. In this situation the two components (the two reflections) will be added as phasors and the resulting field will determine the overall RCS. When these two components are out of phase relative to each other, cancellation occurs. This means that under such circumstances the RCS becomes null and the object is completely invisible to the radar.

It is immediately apparent that performing similar numeric approximations for the complex shape of an aircraft would be difficult. This would require a large body of experimental data for the specific airframe, properties of plasma, aerodynamic aspects, incident radiation, etc. In contrast, the original computations discussed in this paper were done by a handful of people on an IBM 704 computer made in 1956, and at the time, this was a novel subject with very little research background. So much has changed in science and engineering since 1963, that differences between a metal sphere and a modern combat jet pale in comparison.

A simple application of plasma stealth is the use of plasma as an antenna: metal antenna masts often have large radar cross sections, but a hollow glass tube filled with low pressure plasma can also be used as an antenna, and is entirely transparent to radar when not in use.

== See also ==
- Stealth technology
- Active camouflage
- Multi-spectral camouflage
- Cloaking device
- Penetration aid
