= Koroteyev =

Koroteyev or Koroteev (Russian: Коротеев) is a Russian masculine surname, its feminine counterpart is Koroteyeva or Koroteeva. It may refer to

- Anatoliy Koroteyev (born 1936), Russian theoretical physicist
- Konstantin Koroteev (1901–1953), Soviet military officer
- Mariya Koroteyeva (born 1981), Russian hurdler
