= Grigory Bakhchivandzhi =

Russian test pilot (1909–1943)

- Григорий Яковлевич Бахчиванджи
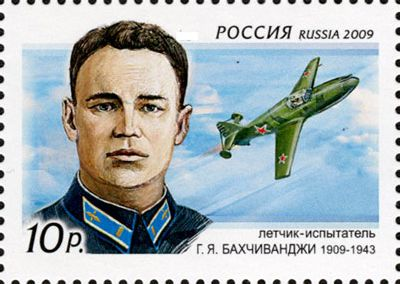
- Bakhchivandzhi on a 2009 Russian stamp
- Born: 20 February [O.S. 7 February] 1909; Brinkovskaya village, Tamansky otdel, Kuban oblast, Russian Empire
- Died: 27 March 1943 (aged 34); Patrushi, Sysertsky District, USSR
- Military career
- Allegiance: Soviet Union
- Branch: Soviet Air Force
- Service years: 1931–1943
- Rank: Captain
- Awards: Hero of the Soviet Union

Grigory Yakovlevich Bakhchivandzhi (Russian: Григорий Яковлевич Бахчиванджи; 20 February [O.S. 7 February] 1909 – 27 March 1943) was a Soviet fighter pilot and early jet test pilot. In 1942 he flew the first powered takeoff of a Soviet rocket plane, the BI-1, (Note: The RP-318-1, a rocket-powered glider designed by Sergei Korolev made a rocket-powered flight in 1940, but it did not make a powered takeoff from the ground) but he died in the line of duty testing the Bereznyak-Isayev BI-3 variant the next year. He was posthumously awarded the title Hero of the Soviet Union in 1973 for his test pilot work.

== Early life ==
Bakhchivandzhi was born on 20 February [O.S. 7 February] 1909 (Note: Sources differ as to if he was born in 1908 or 1909) in Brinkovskaya village to a Greek-Gagauz (Note: Sources differ as to Bakhchivandzhi was Greek, Gagauz, or both.) family. Despite losing his mother when he was only six years old, he did well in school. After completing seven grades of school in his home village he found work in a foundry in Primorsko-Akhtarsk and later as a locomotive driver. After moving to Mariupol in 1927 he participated in the construction of the Illich Steel and Iron Works and later worked as a pipe-roller. As a member of the Komsomol, he was inspired to join the airforce, and chose to enlist in the Red Army in 1931. The next year he was admitted to the Communist party.

== Aviation career ==
After graduating from aviation technical school in 1933 and then the Orenburg School of Pilots in 1934, he started working at the Air Force Research Institute in 1935. In the 1930s he worked on the testing various aircraft and new systems, such as the RS-82. However, after the German invasion of the Soviet Union in 1941, Bakhchivandzhi volunteered to take a break from test flying to go to the warfront as a fighter pilot. He participated in the defense of Moscow, flying 65 sorties on the MiG-3, during which he engaged in 26 aerial engagements, accumulating two solo and three shared shootdowns. He was awarded the Order of Lenin on 17 October 1942 for it. However, he did not stay on the warfront for long, and was recalled from the front in August 1941 to be sent back to the Air Force Research Institute, along with several other former test pilots.

There he was assigned to testing of the Bereznyak-Isayev BI-1, short-range rocket powered interceptor. On 15 May 1942 he performed the maiden powered flight on the BI-1, departing from Koltsovo airfield. Later test pilot, Konstantin Gruzdev made a test flight on the BI-2, (Note: The BI-2 and BI-3 were identical to the BI-1 except in the design of the undercarriage, with the BI-1 having a conventional landing gear but the BI-2 and BI-3 having skid landing gears.) and while the engine was able to achieve full thrust, one of the skids in the undercarriage broke, but Gruzdev was able to safely land the plane, after which he described the experience of flying it as like being “a devil riding a broom”, leading to the prototype being nicknamed the “devil’s broomstick”. Problems with the rocket motor prevented additional test flights until March 1943. When Bakhchivandzhi starting flying the BI again in 1943, making three flights on the BI-2, reaching a speed of 675 km/h. On 21 March he achieves a climb rate of 83 meters per second in the BI-3, which was far faster than contemporary Soviet piston-engined propeller aircraft.

== Death and legacy ==
On 27 March 1943, Bakhchivandzhi was killed in the crash of the BI-3 he was testing. The flight, which was only the seventh test flight of the aircraft, initially went well, with Bakhchivandzhi clocking a speed of around 800 to 900 km/h; the onboard instruments were damaged in the crash so it was impossible to determine for sure the exact speed it reached. However, only 78 seconds into the flight, after pushing on the throttles, the BI-3 suddenly went into a 50 degree nosedive and crashed into a frozen lake, instantly killing Bakhchivandzhi. As a result of the crash, the Air Force became more skeptical of the program, and even though further test flights on rocket-powered aircraft were made, they did not realize that the cause of the crash was due to the Mach tuck effect until four years later during wind tunnel tests. The plan for building 50 BI-VS for dispatching small bombs was cancelled, and two other rocket projects, the Polikarpov Malyutka and Tikhonravov I-302P were cancelled too, but research and testing of other rocket-propelled aircraft went on, especially after the capture of German rocket-propelled fighters in 1945.

For many years, few outside of the test pilot group that flew with him remembered Bakhchivandzi but his colleagues tried to preserve his memory, and on 28 April 1973, nearly thirty years after his death, he was posthumously awarded the title Hero of the Soviet Union. In 1963 an obelisk was erected on his grave at the cemetery in Maly Istok. A bronze bust of Bakhchivandzi was installed in Sverdlovsk Airport, the former site of Koltsovo airfield, and a monument honoring him was placed in his hometown of Brinkovskaya. There are streets named after him in Yekaterinburg, Donetsk, Mariupol, and several other cities, as well as a crater on the far side of the Moon named after him. A neighbourhood of the town of Shchyolkovo. Moscow Oblast was also named after Bakhchivandzhi (now renamed to Shchyolkovo-4) and its train station. Yuri Gagarin said: “Without the flight of Grigory Bakhchivandzhi, perhaps there would not have been 12 April 1961” (Russian: Без полёта Григория Бахчиванджи, может быть, не было бы и 12 апреля 1961 года, referring to the day of his historic flight in Vostok 1.
