= Heinrich Hertel =

German aerospace engineer

Heinrich Hertel (13 November 1901 in Düsseldorf – 5 December 1982) was a German aeronautical engineer.

After graduating as an engineer from Technische Hochschule München (now the Technical University of Munich), he joined the Junkers company in 1926. In 1932, he was recruited by Ernst Heinkel and two years later was made the Technical Director of the Heinkel company — within which Siegfried and Walter Günter were already well-established as top engineers — where he oversaw many projects including the Heinkel He 100 and He 111.

In May 1939 he returned to the board of directors at Junkers where he was closely connected with the development of the Junkers Ju 288 and Ju 248. In February 1945, he also worked on a project of the Dornier Do 635, one of the twin boom fighter aircraft developed from Dornier Do 335 but the project was cancelled in 1945.

After World War II, Hertel worked in France before returning to Germany in 1950 to teach aeronautics in Berlin. From 1959 until his retirement in 1977 he worked as a technical consultant for Focke-Wulf in Bremen.
