= Mikhail Pogosyan =

Russian aerospace engineer

- Михаил Погосян
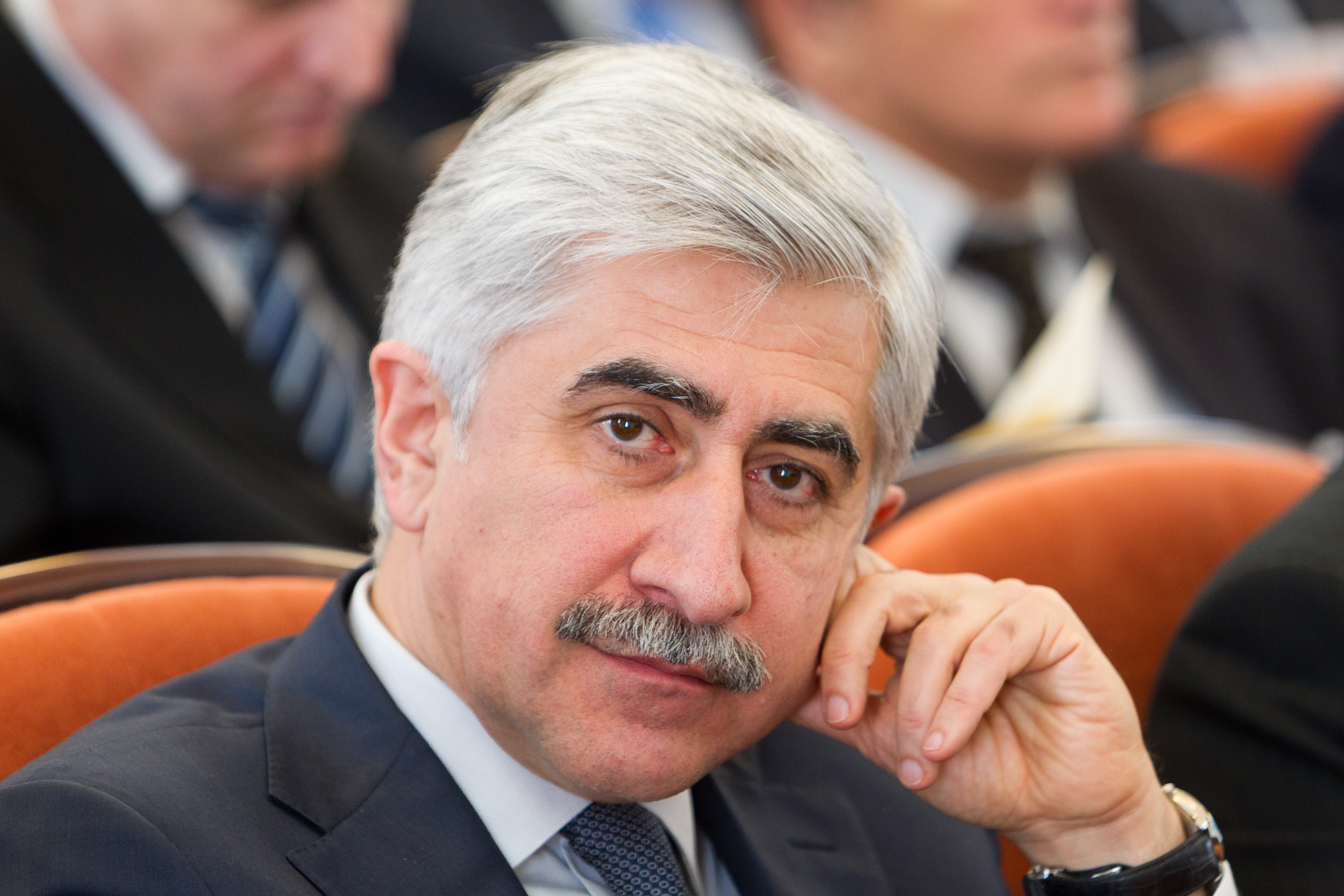
- Born: April 18, 1956 (age 69); Moscow, Soviet Union
- Education: Moscow Aviation Institute
- Engineering career
- Employers: United Aircraft Corporation; Moscow Aviation Institute
- Significant design: Sukhoi Su-27; Sukhoi Su-30; Sukhoi Su-33; Sukhoi Su-34; Sukhoi Su-35; Sukhoi Su-37; Sukhoi Su-47; Sukhoi Su-57; Sukhoi Superjet 100
- Mikhail Pogosyan's voice From the Echo of Moscow program, 7 April 2013

Signature
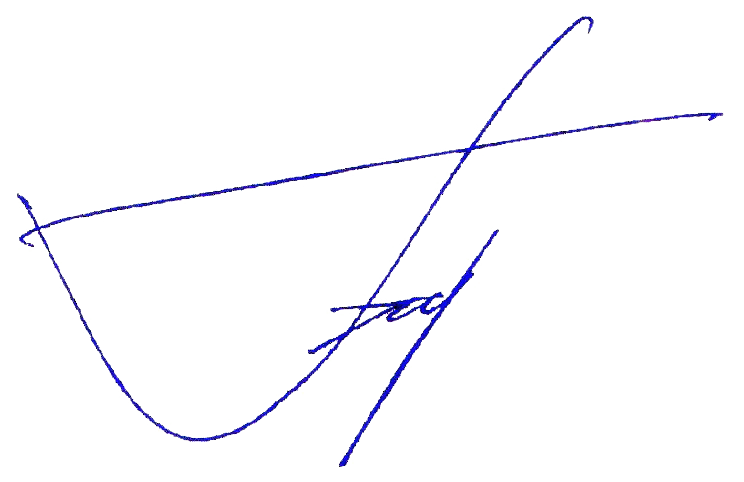

Mikhail Aslanovich Pogosyan (Russian: Михаил Асланович Погосян; born 18 April 1956 in Moscow, Russia) is a Russian aerospace engineer. He is the former general director of Sukhoi and the United Aircraft Corporation and the current rector of the Moscow Aviation Institute. He is of Armenian descent.

== Career ==
In 1979 he graduated with honors from the aircraft manufacturer faculty of the Moscow Aviation Institute and started his career at the engineering plant named after P.O. Sukhoi (now known as the JSC Sukhoi Design Bureau). He started as a designer engineer and then held the posts of the First Deputy Chief Designer (1992-1998), Chairman of Directors Board of the Design Bureau (1995-1999) and, eventually, General Director of the Sukhoi Design Bureau (starting from May 1999).

He is the author of 11 patents and inventions, 14 scientific papers, a Laureate of the State RF Prize in 1997 and Laureate of the Russian Government Prize in 1998, Doctor of Science, is a Corresponding Member of the Russian Academy of Sciences and is a Member of the Entrepreneurial Council at the Russian Government.

On 31 January 2011, he was appointed general director of United Aircraft Corporation (UAC) and replaced in January 2015.

On 16 June 2016, he was named the rector of the Moscow Aviation Institute.

== Personal life ==
Married, with two children. Elder daughter, Olga (born 1981) — graduated from the Higher School of Economics.

== Awards ==
- Order of Alexander Nevsky (November 5, 2020) — for services to scientific and pedagogical activities, training of qualified specialists and many years of conscientious work;
- Order of Honour (2002) — for his contribution to the development, creation and mass production of the Su-33 carrier-based fighter;
- Medal "In Commemoration of the 850th Anniversary of Moscow";
- Medal of Stolypin P. A. II degree (2016) — for services in solving strategic tasks of the socio-economic development of the country and the implementation of long-term projects of the Government of the Russian Federation in the field of aircraft engineering;
- Commander of Order of Merit of the Italian Republic (Italy, December 27, 2008);
- Laureate of State Prize of the Russian Federation in the field of literature and art in 1996 (in the field of design) (May 29, 1997) — for the design and ergonomic development of the Su-27 family of aircraft;
- Laureate of the award of the Government of the Russian Federation (1998);
- Certificate of Honor of the Government of the Russian Federation (April 18, 2006) — for services to the creation of new models of military and civil aviation equipment and many years of fruitful work;
- Certificate of Honor of the Ministry of Industry and Energy of Russia;
- Winner of the National Golden Idea Award (2001);
- The title of "Benefactor of the province" (Astrakhan Oblast, August 13, 2002) — for active charity work and personal contribution to the development of mass physical culture and sports in the Astrakhan region;
- Badge "Honorary employee of the UOMZ" (Ural Optical and Mechanical Plant, 2006) — for supporting the development of optoelectronic instrumentation in aviation;
- Honorary Professor of Kazan National Research Technical University named after A.N. Tupolev (2010);
- Gold Medal named after Lev Nikolaev (November 14, 2016) — for significant contribution to education, popularization of scientific and cultural achievements.
