= Messerschmitt Me 263 =

German fighter prototype

Me 263
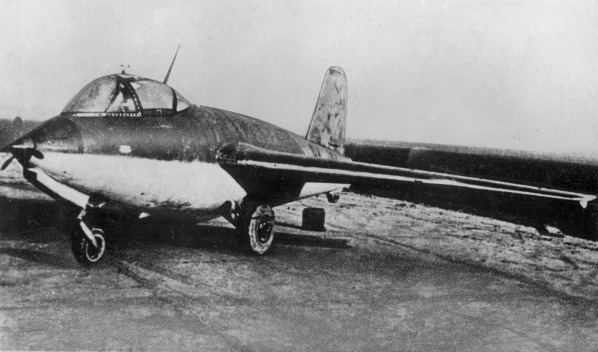
- Me 263 V1

General information
- Type: Fighter-interceptor
- Manufacturer: Messerschmitt/Junkers
- Designer: Alexander Lippisch
- Primary user: Luftwaffe
- Number built: 3

History
- First flight: 8 February 1945 (unpowered)
- Developed from: Messerschmitt Me 163 Komet

The Messerschmitt Me 263 Scholle (Plaice) was a rocket-powered fighter aircraft developed from the Me 163 Komet towards the end of World War II. Three prototypes were built but never flown under their own power as the rapidly deteriorating military situation in Germany prevented the completion of the test program.

== History ==
Although the Me 163 had very short endurance, it had originally been even shorter. In the first design, the rocket had no throttle and burned through its fuel in a few minutes. Not only did this sharply limit endurance, during flight testing pilots found the aircraft quickly exhibited compressibility effects as they levelled out from the climb and the speed picked up. This led the RLM to demand the addition of a throttle, leading to lengthy delays but a dramatic increase in fuel economy when throttled.

This problem was addressed in the larger Me 163C, which featured the same HWK 509B or -C dual chamber rocket engine already tested on the Me 163B V6 and V18 prototypes. The main upper chamber was tuned for high thrust while the lower Marschofen combustion chamber was designed for much less thrust (about 400 kgf maximum) for economic cruise. In operation, throttling was accomplished by stopping and restarting the main engine, which was about four times as powerful as the smaller one. This change greatly simplified the engine, while giving much higher efficiency during cruise. Along with slightly increased fuel tankage, the powered flight time rose to about 12 minutes, a 50% improvement. Since the aircraft spent only a short time climbing, this meant the endurance at combat altitude would more than double.

=== Ju 248 ===
Throughout development the RLM was disappointed with the progress on the 163 project, and eventually decided to transfer development to Heinrich Hertel at Junkers. Lippisch remained at Messerschmitt and retained the support of Waldemar Voigt, continuing development of the 163C.

At Junkers, the basic design of the 163C was followed to produce an even larger version, the Ju 248. It retained the new pressurized cockpit and bubble canopy of the 163C, with more fuel capacity, and added a new retractable landing gear. On September 25, 1944 a wooden mock-up was shown to officials. The production version was intended to be powered by the more powerful BMW 109-708 rocket engine in place of the Walter power plant.

Prior to the assembly of the Ju 248, two Me 163Bs, v13 and v18, were slated to be rebuilt. V13 had deteriorated from weather exposure, so only v18 was rebuilt, but had been flown by test pilot Heini Dittmar to a record-setting 1,130 kilometres per hour (700 mph) on 6 July 1944 and suffered near-total destruction of its rudder surface as a result. It is this aircraft that is often identified as the Me 163D, but it was built after the Ju 248 project had started.

Hertel had hoped to install Lorin ramjet engines, but this technology was still far ahead of its time. As a stopgap measure, they decided to build the aircraft with Sondergeräte (special equipment) in the form of a Zusatztreibstoffbehälter (auxiliary fuel tank): two 160 L (35 imp gal; 42 US gal) external T-Stoff oxidizer tanks were to be installed under the wings. This would lead to a 10% speed decrease but no negative flight characteristics. Although Junkers claimed the Ju 248 used a standard Me 163B wing, they decided to modify the wing to hold more C-Stoff fuel. This modification was carried out by the Puklitsch firm.

=== Me 263 ===
In November 1944, the aircraft was again redesignated as the Me 263 to show its connection with the Me 163. The two projects also got names - the Ju 248 Flunder (Flounder) and the Me 263 Scholle (Plaice). In early 1945, Junkers proposed its own project, the EF 127 Walli rocket fighter, as a competitor to the Me 163C and Me 263.

The first unpowered flight of the Me 263 v1 was in February 1945. Several more unpowered flights took place that month. The biggest problem shifted the center of gravity which was restored with the addition of counterweights. Eventually, the production aircraft would have repositioned the engine or the landing gear installation to solve this problem. The landing gear was still non-retractable. The first flights gave the impression that it was suitable as it was for production.

Test flights later had to be halted due to fuel shortages for the Bf 110 towplanes. Because the Me 263 was not part of the Jägernotprogramm (Emergency Fighter Program), it was difficult to get the resources it needed. For the time being the plane was not expected to enter production but further development was allowed. The v2 and v3 were not yet ready. The v2 was to get the retractable landing gear and the v3 would have its armament built in. The next month both the v1 and the v2 had the dual-chamber HWK 109-509C installed, correcting the center-of-gravity problems. They flew only as gliders.

In April, the Americans occupied the plant and captured the three prototypes and the mock-up. The v2 was destroyed but another prototype ended up in the US. The others were handed over to the Russians, who then created their own Mikoyan-Gurevich I-270 interceptor.

== Specifications (Me 263 V1) ==
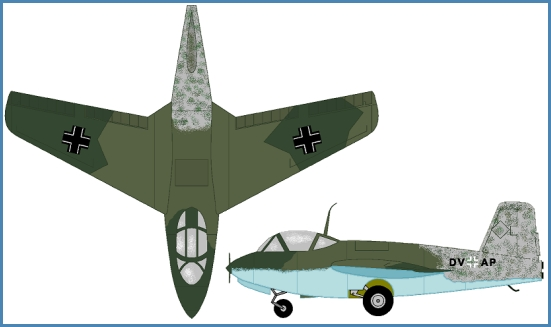
Messerschmitt Me 263

Data from Die Deutsche Luftrüstung 1933–1945 Vol.3 – Flugzeugtypen Henschel-Messerschmitt

General characteristics

- Crew: 1
- Length: 7.89 m (25 ft 11 in)
- Wingspan: 9.5 m (31 ft 2 in)
- Height: 3.17 m (10 ft 5 in)
- Wing area: 17.8 m^{2} (192 sq ft)
- Airfoil: root: Me 1.8 25 14-1.1-30; tip: NACA 00008-1.885-20
- Empty weight: 2,210 kg (4,872 lb)
- Gross weight: 5,310 kg (11,707 lb)
- Powerplant: 1 × Walter HWK 109-509C-3 liquid-propellant rocket engine, 19.61 kN (4,410 lbf) thrust

Performance

- Maximum speed: 950 km/h (590 mph, 510 kn)
- Landing speed: 145 km/h (90 mph; 78 kn)
- Range: 125 km (78 mi, 67 nmi)
- Endurance: 15 minutes at 11,000 m (36,000 ft)
- Service ceiling: 16,000 m (52,000 ft)
- Rate of climb: 150 m/s (30,000 ft/min)

Armament

- 2 × 30 mm (1.18 in) MK 108 cannon in the wing roots

== See also ==
Related development

- Messerschmitt Me 163
- Mikoyan-Gurevich I-270

Aircraft of comparable role, configuration, and era

- Bachem Ba 349

Related lists

- List of military aircraft of Germany
