= Moscow Aviation Institute =

Higher-education engineering institute in Russia

Coordinates: 55.808°N 37.503°E

- Московский авиационный институт
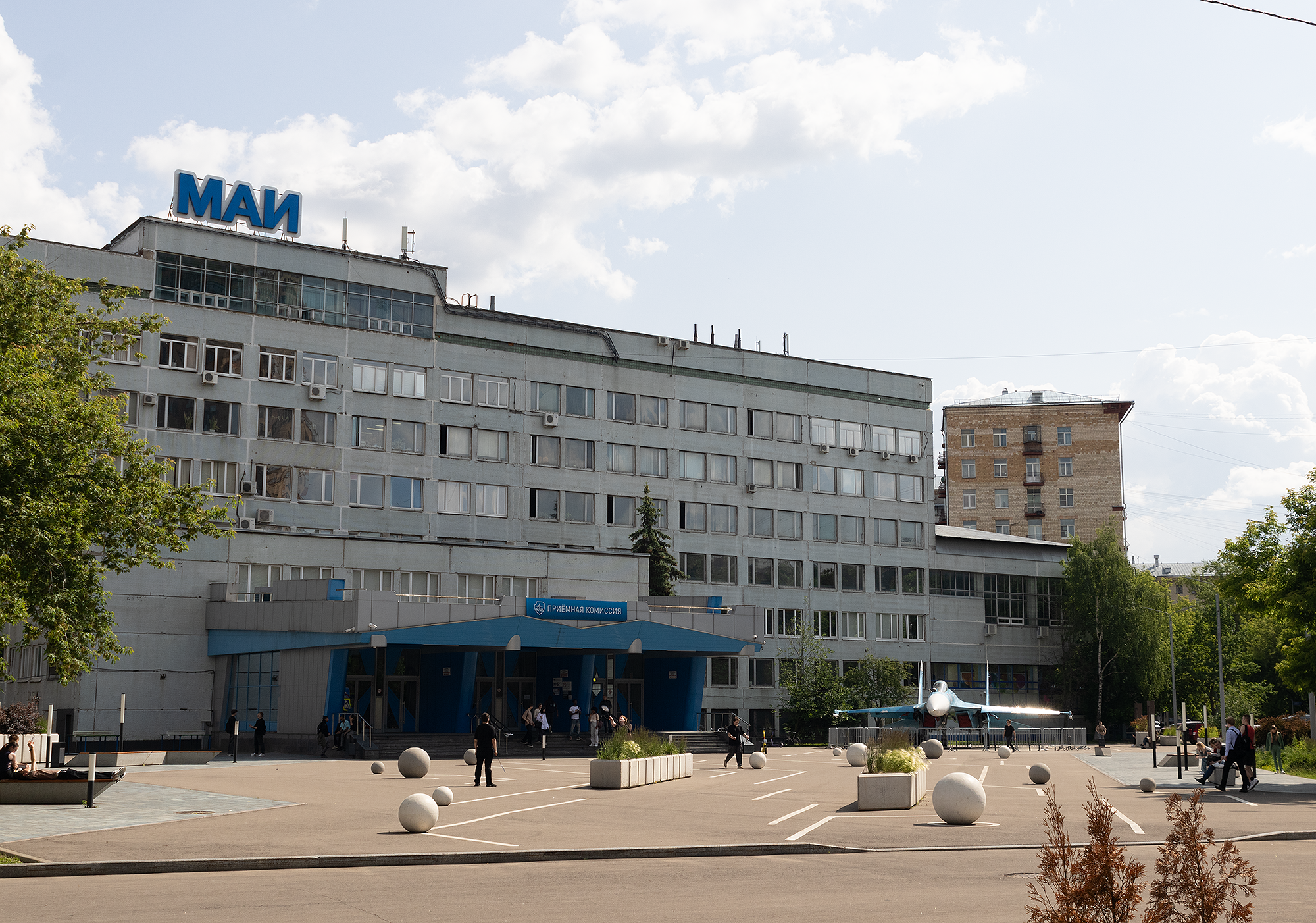
- Former name: Moscow Aviation Institute named after Sergo Ordzhonikidze
- Type: Public
- Established: 29 August 1930
- Rector: Mikhail Pogosyan
- Academic staff: 3,850, 1,100 Ph.D, 450 professors
- Students: 20,000 (1,250 international students)
- Location: Moscow, Russia
- Colors: Deep sky blue and white
- Website: mai.ru

Moscow Aviation Institute (Russian: Московский авиационный институт) is an engineering research university in Moscow, Russia. It is designated a National Research University. Since its inception the institute has been spearheading advances in aerospace technology both within Russia and worldwide. The university has placed emphasis on laboratory instruction in applied science and engineering, specific to the demands of aerospace industry.

During World War II part of the university was evacuated to Almaty, Kazakhstan. Staffs and students continued to work on research and wartime production throughout the war. During the Post-War period, the university expanded and assimilated new technologies during the Jet age. Research conducted in the university contributed to heralding the space age.

The university employs more than 160,000 specialists, 250 chief designers in the Aerospace Industry. 50 Academicians of the Russian Academy of Sciences, 22 cosmonauts, 100 test pilots and 60 Olympic champions in different sports.

Alumni of the institute form the backbone of many companies like Sukhoi, Mikoyan, Ilyushin, Tupolev, Yakovlev, Beriev, Myasishchev, Mil Moscow Helicopter Plant, Energia, Lavochkin, Makeyev Rocket Design Bureau, Khrunichev State Research and Production Space Center, NPO Energomash, Almaz-Antey and others.

== History ==
=== Founding and vision ===
There was a task in the USSR – to prepare 435,000 engineers and technicians in five years (1930–1935) during the USSR industrialization period, while their number in 1929 was 66,000.

Moscow Aviation Institute (National Research University) was established on 20 March 1930 as Higher Aero-mechanical college (VAMU) by the order of Supreme Soviet of the National Economy in order to ensure training of qualified personnel for the aviation industry. The Aero-mechanical faculty of Bauman Moscow State Technical University formed the basis of the new university. On 29 August 1930, the university was renamed as Moscow Aviation Institute. In the beginning it had 3 departments, Aeronautical, Aircraft engines and Aerodynamics. On its tenth anniversary in 1940, the university had established itself as a premier aeronautical university with 38 departments, 22 laboratories and a Student design office and production facility.

The uniqueness of the MAI is that historically it was created to train specialists for almost all departments and teams in the Design Bureaus of the aviation industry.

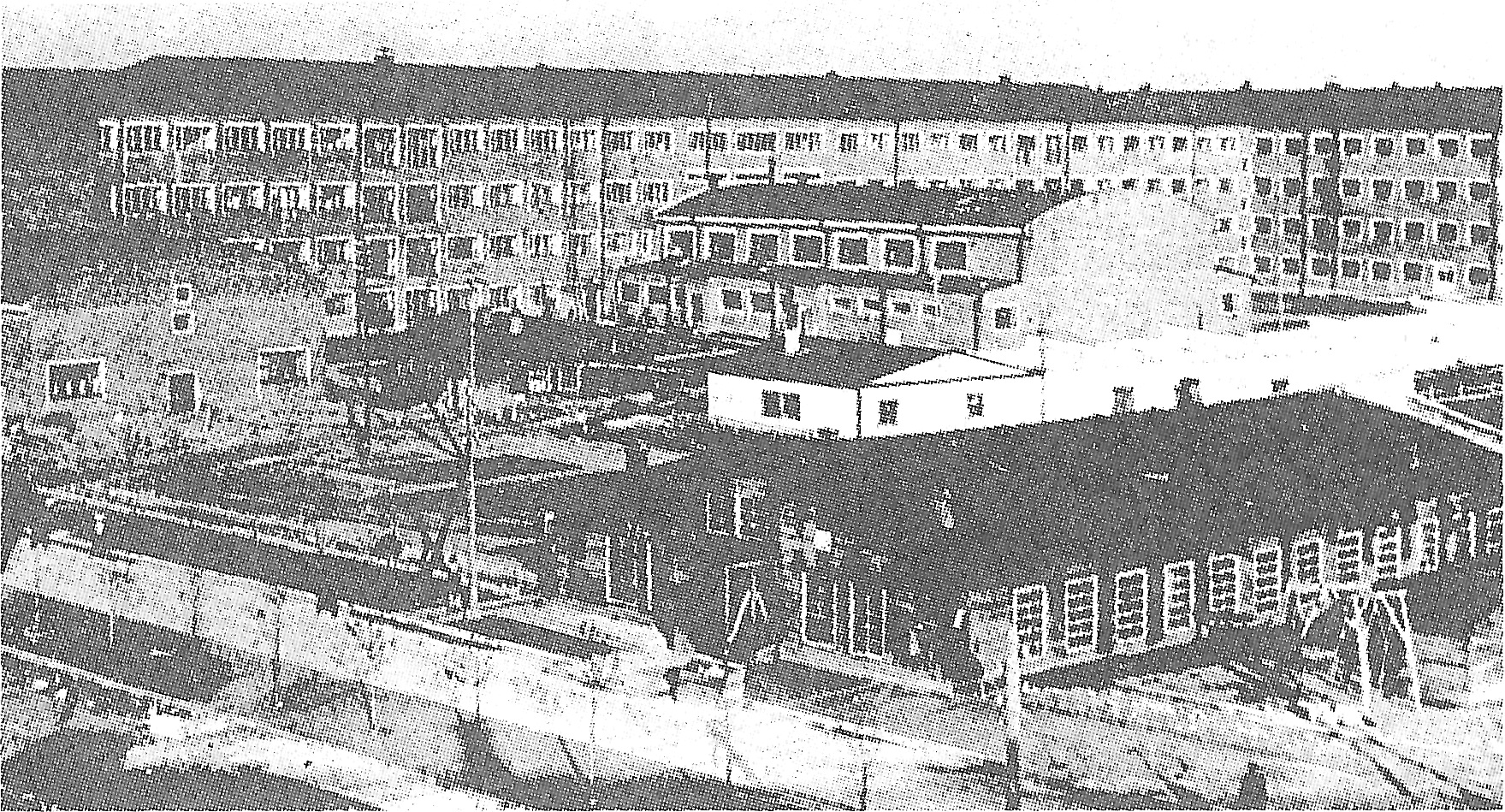
First building of MAI-no.3, 1935.

=== World War II ===
On 22 June 1941, Nazi Germany invaded the Soviet Union. The students and faculty members were mobilized to work in aircraft workshops and design offices. Many students signed up to join the armed forces during the Battle of Moscow, many continued to work aircraft production facilities and armaments workshops.

The university was partly evacuated to Almaty, Kazakhstan under the leadership of Alexander Yakovlev. By 1942 the Moscow campus of MAI started functioning in parallel with the Almaty campus. It was in the workshops of MAI in Almaty, Mikhail Kalashnikov, the legendary rifle designer, worked on his AK-47 assault rifle.

By 1943, the university was completely relocated back to Moscow. Members of the university were involved in research & designing new combat aircraft and sub-systems, along with refining and redesigning existing aircraft, for the war effort.

In 1945 the institute was awarded the Order of Lenin.

=== Jet age & Space age ===
Although prototypes of the first jet aircraft were made as far back as 1910 by Henri Coandă, it was during World War II that significant developments were made. Arkhip Lyulka designed the first Two-stage centrifugal compressor Turbojet in 1938. Alexander Bereznyak a graduate of MAI, designed the first jet aircraft in the USSR, the Bereznyak-Isayev BI-1 in 1942.

After the war, the university placed special emphasis on developing new technology required for developing jet aircraft and was quick to adapt to new technologies. This was emphasised in May 1946, during the second Student technical conference, faculty members of the institute defended 6 post-doctoral theses and 14 Ph.Ds on various aspects regarding development of jet aircraft. On 26 April 1946, Mikoyan-Gurevich MiG-9 became the first operational turbojet fighter in the USSR.

It was also in the same year the Faculty of Radio Electronics was established based on department of Radio-location, to assimilate newer technologies in the field of Radio location.

The era of helicopters began in USSR with two leading pioneers at MAI Boris Yuryev, inventor of Swashplate in helicopters and Bratukhin, they were awarded the state prize of the USSR in 1946. In 1952, department of helicopter design was established under the leadership of Prof. Boris Yuryev.

In 1955, the university celebrated its silver jubilee.

On 4 October 1957, the USSR launched the first artificial satellite opening up Space for mankind, graduates from MAI were deeply involved in the space program from its inception under the leadership of Sergey Korolev, the legendary chief designer of head of the Soviet space program and Mikhail Tikhonravov chief designer of satellites Sputnik-3, Luna-1, Luna-3, Luna-4.

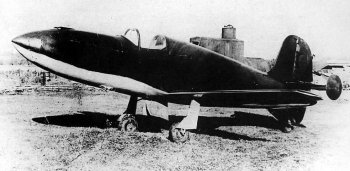
BI-1

=== Cold War ===
During the Cold War, students, faculty members and graduates of the university were involved in cutting-edge research in the fields of Aeronautics, Missile development and armaments research. They were pivotal in keeping the USSR ahead in the arms race in close collaboration with the aerospace and defense industry and research organizations like TsAGI, National Institute of Aviation Technologies, VIAM, TsIAM, TsNII VVS, Gromov Flight Research Institute among others.

Key figures from the university during this era were Rostislav Belyakov chief designer of MIG-29, Myasishchev, Mikhail Yangel, Sergey Mikheev chief designer of Kamov helicopters, Marat Tishchenko of Mil helicopters, Mikhail Reshetnev and others.

In 1962, the university established the Student design office(ОСКБ — объединение СКБ факультетов и кафедр), which integrated different faculties and departments within the institute to develop aircraft prototypes in-house and to provide greater exposure to students in design and production work. The Design office functions today as the OKKBES-MAI http://oskbes.ru/english.html.

== Moscow Aviation Institute today ==
The present-day MAI features extensive research and development infrastructure, including more than 120 laboratories, 3 student design offices, 3 specialized resource centers, an experimental-design factory, and an active aerodrome.

In 1980 the institute was awarded the Order of the October Revolution. On 31 March 2015 the Ministry of Education reorganized Moscow Aviation Institute (MAI) by annexation of the Russian State Technological University named after Tsiolkovsky (MATI).

As of September 2022, the Moscow Aviation Institute was added to an economic blacklist by the US for attempting to acquire US originated parts to support the Russian war effort.

== OSKBES MAI ==
The history of aircraft creation in the MAI (Moscow Aviation Institute) began simultaneously with the foundation of the institute in 1930. The modern design bureau in the MAI was formed in 1965 as a students one. It was engaged in creating experimental pilot and remote controlled light aircraft, which were developed according to the requirements specifications of various organizations of the Ministry of Aviation Industry (MAP), the Ministry of Civil Aviation (MGA) and the Ministry of Defense (MOP).

In 1982 by the order of Ministry of Aircraft Industry the Design Bureau was transformed into a branch-wise experimental students aircraft construction design bureau of the MAI. The work was carried out by professional engineers. If necessary the co-workers from among the MAI students and teachers and also from among the workers of the industry were invited. The production facility of the MAI aircraft development plant (EOZ) in the experimental development shop (shop No. 3) are staffed by qualified technicians. The OSKBES work on the experimental aircraft engineering constantly received high estimations of the industry. Their technical novelty and utility are confirmed by nine Introduction Certificates and more than twenty Invention Certificates. By the end of 1980s six experimental aircraft of different types were designed and built: Kvant, Elf-D UAV, PS-01 small-sized UAV, Elf, Photon and Yunior aircraft.

The basic structure, address and the industrial areas occupied by it in the OSKBES MAI have remained the same. The EOZ MAI (shop No. 3) and the MAPO (Moscow aircraft building plant) were used as an industrial base. On 27 July 1992 the application on realization the inspection work in the OKB MA for reception the certificate for the right to develop the civil aircraft engineering was sent to the Aviaregister of the MAK and the Air Industry Department of the Ministry of Industry of Russian Federation. It was made on behalf of the "Aviatika" joint-stock company. According to the inspection results the Aviaregister of the MAK issued Certificate No. R-9 to the "Aviatika" joint-stock company with the right to develop light civil aircraft. It was on 17 February 1993.

Aircraft designed and developed at OSKBES include

A single-seater Aviatika-MAI-890 aircraft — passed certification, had a temporary Certificate of a type of 31 March 1994 No. 52В-890, valid till 1 April 1995, is series produced by the RAC "MiG"; A two-seater Aviatika-MAI-890U aircraft is serially produced by the RAC "MiG"; An agricultural Aviatika-MAI-890SKh aircraft is serially produced by the RAC "MiG"; A single-seater Aviatika-MAI-900 aerobatics ("Akrobat")' A two-seater Aviatika-MAI-910 with wings, folding on the ground; An Aviatika-MAI-920 glider; A single-seater Aviatika-MAI-890A autogyro, a pre-production model at the stage of flying test. The basis for the "Aviatika" aircraft manufacture at the MAPO plant is the License Agreement concluded by this plant with the "Aviatika" joint-stock company on 10 April 1995 (contract No. 4276).

The personnel of the OSKBES have continued to work in the field of light civil aircraft together with the MAPO MIG.

On 27 April 1998, the Aviaregister of Interstate Aviation Committee issued a Design Organization Certificate R-52 of the developer of light civil aircraft.

On 29 September 1999 eight members of our design bureau, Moscow Aviation Institute and RAC "MIG" were rewarded by "State Prize of the Russian Federation in science and technology" for designing and development of light multipurpose airplanes in a serial production. They are:

OSKBES MAI Chief Designer K. Zhidovetskiy (posthumously); OSKBES MAI Deputy Chief Designer (after the death of K. Zhidovetskiy — Chief Designer) N. Goryunov; OSKBES MAI Deputy Chief Designer V. Demin; OSKBES MAI Deputy Chief Designer V. Feigenbaum; Rector of MAI A. Matveyenko; Manager of MAI Experimental Plant P. Ogadzhanov; General Manager of RAC "MIG" plant G. Nemov; Deputy Manager of RAC "MIG" O. Chukantsev.

Autogyro MAI-205 made the first flight in 2001, chief designer Andrey Zorin.

In 2002, OSKBES MAI has started designing a new plane MAI-223. This plane made the first flight in 2004.

In 2003, OSKBES MAI started to work on different aircraft, airships and autogyros. It designed and produced gondolas, nacelles, fly-by-wire power plant controls and empennages of NPO "RosAeroSystems" airships Au-30 and Au-12M.

The design and development of Autogyro MAI-208 was started in 2006. The first MAI-208 is undergoing testing. OSKBES MAI presented MAI-208 at the second international exhibition of the helicopter industry "HeliRussia-2009" (21...23 May 2009, Moscow). The new autogyro has generated much interest from visitors and the press.

On 1 July 2008 Vadim Demin was appointed Chief Designer of OSKBES MAI. The same year the design office has started working on a new multi-purpose four-seat twin engine aircraft MAI-407.

In 2009 OSKBES MAI started designing a new training glider MAI-227.

== Notable alumni ==
=== Engineers and scientists ===
- Guy Severin former General Director of JSC NPP Zvezda
- Mikhail Pogosyan former general director of the United Aircraft Corporation, now (2019) - rector of MAI
- Vasily Mishin Soviet and Russian rocket scientist and engineer
- Wang Yongzhi Chinese aerospace scientist, designer of China's first crewed spacecraft Shenzhou 5 and Shenzhou 6
- Aleksandr Nadiradze, "father" of the mobile ICBMs
- Peter Grushin
- Valentin Bliznyuk, Soviet and Russian aircraft designer, chief designer of the Tupolev Tu-160
- Alexander Dynkin
- Anatoliy Koroteyev
- Viktor Makeyev
- Genrikh Novozhilov
- Alexei Tupolev
- Mikhail Yangel
- Arseny Mironov aerospace scientist, engineer, aircraft pilot
- Semyon Kosberg Jewish Soviet engineer, expert in the field of aircraft and rocket engines
- Sergey Kapitsa son of Pyotr Kapitsa
- Alexey Pajitnov creator of the video game Tetris
- Igor Zotikov

=== Cosmonauts ===
(in order of first flight)

- Valeri Kubasov
- Valentin Lebedev
- Vladislav Volkov
- Vitaly Sevastyanov
- Aleksandr Ivanchenkov
- Svetlana Savitskaya
- Igor Volk
- Gennadi Manakov
- Musa Manarov
- Viktor Afanasyev
- Anatoly Artsebarsky
- Toktar Aubakirov
- Aleksandr Poleshchuk
- Yury Usachov
- Nikolai Budarin
- Aleksandr Lazutkin
- Pavel Vinogradov
- Leonid Kadeniuk
- Mikhail Tyurin
- Fyodor Yurchikhin
- Mikhail Kornienko
- Yelena Serova
- Aleksandr Gorbunov

=== Ambassadors ===
- Anatoly Dobrynin
- Leonid Zamyatin
- Mikhail Smirnovsky
- Nikolay Firyubin
- and some other

=== Other ===
- Aleksandr Dugin Russian philosopher
- Mikhail Nikolayevich Zadornov Russian stand-up comedian and writer
- Nkeirouka Ezekh Russian curler
- Eduard Uspensky Russian writer and author of several children's books
- Maksim Shevchenko editor, journalist and presenter on television and radio in Russia
- Yevgeniya Chirikova Russian environmental activist
- Lyudmila Titova retired Russian speed skater
- Mike Fincke American Astronaut
- Valery Kovalev Russian entrepreneur, philanthropist and Wikimedian.
- Karina Kiseleva Belarusian beauty pageant winner
- Tatyana Russiyan-Gubanova Russian helicopter sports world record holder
- Gleb Korablyov Russian community theatre actor and suicide victim

== Ratings ==
In 2015 MAI reached top-200 Round University Ranking (RUR).

Годы	National university rating	RA EXPERT	RUR	QS BRICS	QS EECA	THE
2019				105^{↑}	140^{↓}	
2018	40^{↓}	27^{↑}	515^{↑}	113^{↑}	117^{↑}	1001+
2017	25–27^{↑}	32^{↑}	526^{↓}	131^{↓}	121=	
2016	28–29^{↓}	35^{↓}	510^{↑}	121^{↑}	121=	
2015	20^{↑}	28^{↑}	557^{↑}	131^{↑}		
2014	20–21^{↑}	29^{↑}	–	–	–	
2013	24–25^{↑}	32=	–	–	–	
2012	23–26^{↑}	32^{↑}	–	–	–	
2011	31–35^{↑}	33^{↑}	–	–	–	

== Schools ==
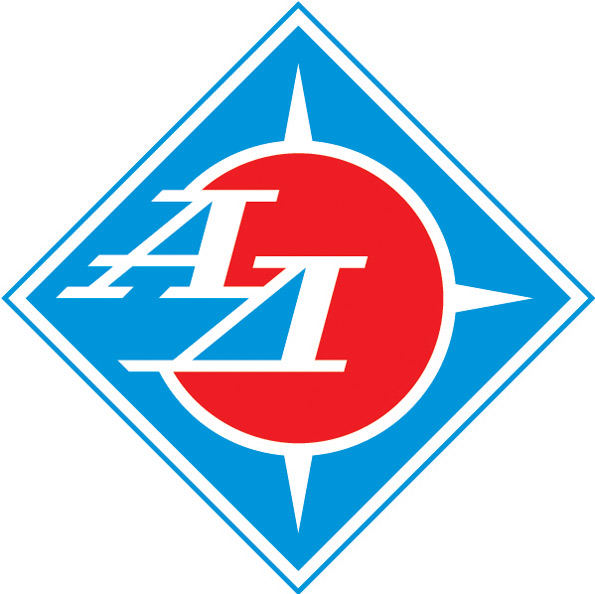
Faculty No 2

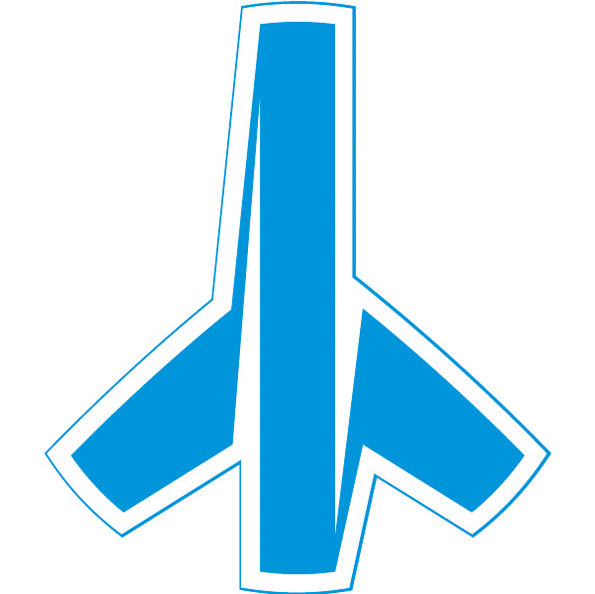
Faculty No 4

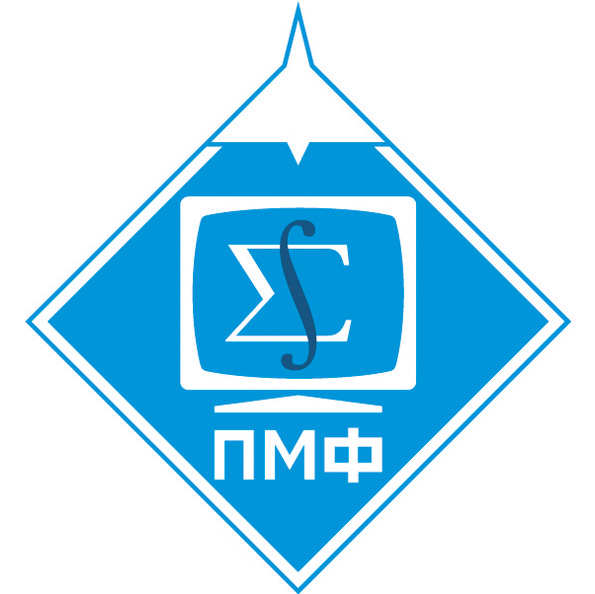
Faculty No 8

1. School №1. Aeronautical Engineering
2. School №2. Engines for Flying Vehicles
3. School №3. Control Systems, informatics and electropower systems
4. School №4. Radio Electronics for flying vehicles
5. School №5. The Institute of Business Engineering MAI
6. School №6. Astronautical and rocket engineering
7. School №7. Robotic and Intelligent Systems
8. School №8. Applied Mathematics and Physics
9. School №9. Applied Mechanics
10. School №10. Social engineering
11. Faculty of the Foreign Languages
12. Preparatory School

== Institutes ==
- Continued Education and Re-certification
- Pre-admission Studies
- Learning center of computer technology
- Physics and mathematics school (Physmatshkola)
- Serpukov MAI department (with IIF RF)
- Institute of Military Science

=== Branches ===
The institute has also several branches:

- Voskhod (Leninsk, Baikonur cosmodrome)
- Vzlet (Akhtubinsk)
- Strela (Zhukovskiy)
- Kometa (Khimki, former territorial faculty No. 20)
- Space technics (Khimki, former territorial faculty No. 50)

== Partner universities ==
- University of Liège, Belgium
- Instituto Tecnológico de Aeronáutica, Brazil
- Bedfordshire University, United Kingdom
- (Germany)
1. Dresden University of Technology, Germany
2. Technische Universität Berlin, Germany
3. Hyperschall Technologie Gottingen, Germany
4. Technische Hochschule Ingolstadt, Germany
5. Esslingen University of Applied Sciences, Germany
6. Heilbronn University of Applied Sciences, Germany
7. Technical University of Munich, Germany until 2005
- Bandung Institute of Technology, Indonesia
- Beihang University, China
- [[Chien Hsin University of Science and Technology|]] Chien Hsin University of Science and Technology, Taiwan

== See also ==
- MAI-223
- Avion MAI F-1
