= Avion MAI F-1 =

Avion MAI F-1 Favorit
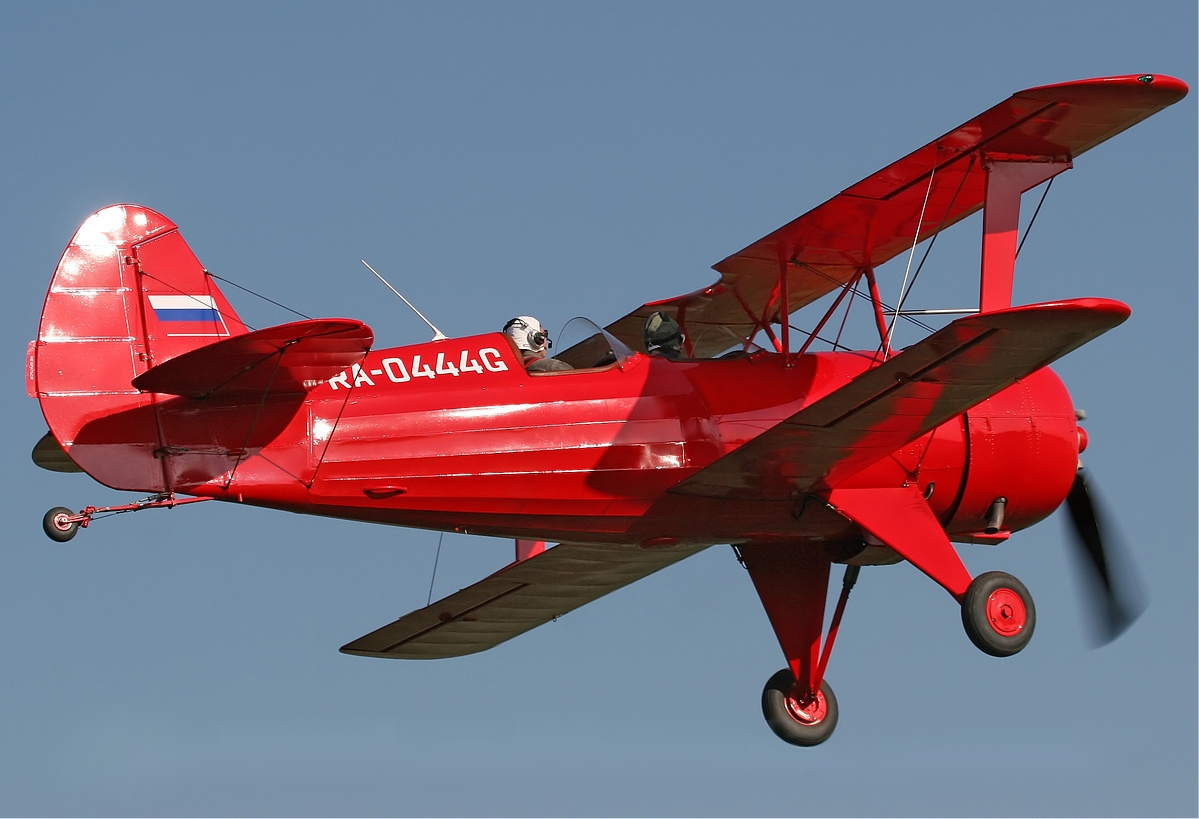
- MAI F-1 (RA-0444G) at Koltchugino in May 2007

General information
- Type: Sporting biplane
- Designer: Avion Group with MAI
- Number built: 1

History
- First flight: May 23, 2006

F-1 Favorit (English: Ф-1 «Фаворит») is a light sporting biplane for aerobatics, a modernized version of B2M Mosquit. It was designed and built by the Avion Group together with Moscow Aviation Institute specialists.

== Specifications (MAI F-1) ==
General characteristics

- Crew: 2
- Wing area: 14.9 m^{2} (160 sq ft)
- Max takeoff weight: 1,045 kg (2,304 lb)
- Take-off run: 150–240 metres (490–790 ft)
- Landing run: 65–120 metres (213–394 ft)
- Powerplant: 1 × Vedeneyev M14P 9-cyl. air-cooled radial piston engine, 270 kW (360 hp)

Performance

- Maximum speed: 380 km/h (240 mph, 210 kn)
- Stall speed: 108 km/h (67 mph, 58 kn)
- g limits: −6 +9
