= Bisnovat SK-1 =

- 3-view of Bisnovat SK-1

General information
- Type: Research aircraft
- National origin: USSR
- Manufacturer: Bisnovat
- Designer: Matus Bisnovat
- Number built: 1

History
- First flight: January 1939
- Developed into: Bisnovat SK-2

The SK-1, (Skorostnoye Krylo – high speed wing), was a research aircraft designed and built in the USSR from 1938.

== Development ==
After working as an engineer under Tairov at the OKO in Kiev, Bisnovat was permitted to form his own OKB with the task of designing and building a high speed research aircraft, which emerged as the SK-1. This aircraft was designed to have the smallest airframe capable of flying powered by a large V-12 engine, with the smallest wings possible for safe landings on Soviet grass airfields.

Construction of the SK-1 was of light-alloy stressed skin, with single plate web spar wings skinned with light-alloy sheet, smoothed to mirror finish accurate profiles using marquisette fabric, cork dust, open weave and adhesive as filler. Initially the wing was of NACA 23014.5 profile with slotted Vlasov style flaps, and fabric covered ailerons. The tail-unit also had fabric covered control surfaces, and trim tabs, with all controls 100% mass balanced.

The M-105 engine was fitted in a low drag installation with a pressurised coolant system which required a radiator of only 0.17m^2 frontal area, (approx ½ that of a similar unpressurised coolant system). In the flush cockpit, the pilot sat on a hydraulically actuated seat which raised the hinged roof of the canopy to form a wind-shield for landing, allowing the fuselage to have a total frontal area of only 0.85 m^2. Hydraulically retractable main and tail undercarriages with fully closing doors reduced drag even further.

Test flights began in January 1939 with the aircraft on skis, with surprisingly good handling and manoeuvrability as well as excellent performance.

== Specifications (SK-1) ==
Data from Gunston, Bill. "Encyclopaedia of Russian Aircraft 1875–1995". London:Osprey. 1995. ISBN 1-85532-405-9

General characteristics

- Crew: 1
- Length: 8.0 m (26 ft 3 in)
- Wingspan: 7.2 m (23 ft 7.5 in)
- Wing area: 9.5 m^{2} (102 sq ft)
- Airfoil: max speed
- Empty weight: 1,505 kg (3,318 lb)
- Gross weight: 2,100 kg (4,630 lb)
- Powerplant: 1 × Klimov M-105 (VK-105) , 783 kW (1,050 hp)

Performance

- Maximum speed: 710 km/h (421 mph, 366 kn)
- Range: 1,000 km (620 mi, 540 nmi)

== See also ==
Aircraft of comparable role, configuration, and era

- Napier-Heston Racer
- Messerschmitt Me 209V1

Related lists

- List of aircraft
