= Bolkhovitinov S =

Russian bomber aircraft from 1937

General information
- Type: High-Speed Bomber
- National origin: USSR
- Designer: Viktor Fedorovich Bolkhovitinov
- Number built: 2

History
- First flight: 29 January 1940

The Bolkhovitinov S (Sparka – twin/joined (engine)) was a high speed bomber aircraft designed and built in the USSR from early in 1937. Other designations used at various times: BBS, BB, LB-S or SSS.

== Development ==
The plane was conceived as a fast light bomber and reconnaissance plane. To obtain high speed and good aerodynamics it was powered by two M-103 inline engines in tandem, driving two contra-rotating, coaxial three-blade propellers. The design had quite unusual look, with long fuselage nose and a cockpit moved rearwards, towards a double tail-fin. The wings had a fighter-like form and their span was rather short. The rear engine was geared to two high-speed shafts which passed either on side of the forward engine to drive the rear propeller gearbox, whilst the forward engine and gearbox drove the forward propeller via shaft through the middle of the rear propeller gearbox.

The structure of the S was predominantly light alloy stressed skin, the wing having two spars with heavy flush-rivetted upper and lower skins, and the fuselage built up from pre-formed upper, lower, and side panels attached to four longerons to give a strong but relatively simple structure to build. A total of 29 electrical actuators drove the Fowler flaps, the undercarriage (which rotating 90 degrees to lie flat in the wing), the exit flap of the large common radiator duct, and many other services. The tail unit consisted of twin fins with rudders attached to the tips of the tailplane, variable geared elevators and separate servo and trim tabs on elevators, and rudders.

The VVIA under Bolkhovitinov was enlarged to tackle the expected problems in the design of the S. Detail design of the aircraft began in 1937 and construction began in July 1938. The first prototype S-1 was finished in 1939. It was built to evaluate only the airframe and was fitted with one M-103 engine. It was unarmed and fitted with a fixed skid landing gear. It first flew on January 29, 1940, with B.N. Kudrin at the controls. A maximum speed was 400 kilometres per hour (250 mph). The second prototype S-2 was powered by two engines and was armed with a single machine gun and bombs. Four 100 kilograms (220 lb) bombs were carried vertically in a bay between the pilot and the rear gunner-navigator, under a common canopy.

The state testing began on March 20, 1940, and lasted until July 1940. The maximum speed reached was 570 kilometres per hour (350 mph). The plane had good handling, except for take-off and landing, which were difficult due to high wing loading. Its range and speed were also lower than estimated. As a result, it was decided to improve the plane further. However, further development was later stopped in favour of subsequent Bolkhovitinov designs. It was initially planned to also build a ground-attack version with two Ultra ShKAS machine guns in a rear part of fuselage, firing downwards and operated by the second crew member. Also an interceptor aircraft was proposed, armed with 37 mm recoilless rifle, firing upwards at an angle, and again operated by the second crew member.

The plane had no official designation given. It was mostly known as S - sparka (otherwise explained as spartak, skorost (speed) or Stalin), also known as BBS - blizhniy bombardovshchik skorostnoi (close-range fast bomber), BB - bombardovshchik Bolkhovitinova, LB-S - legkiy bombardovshchik sparka (light bomber paired), SSS - svyerkhskorostnoi samolet (very fast aircraft).

== Variants ==
- Bolkhovitinov I – A.M. Isayev was the lead designer of this experimental fighter/dive bomber based on a smaller 'S', with tandem M-107 engines envisaged for production aircraft and M-103 or M-105 engines for the prototype. Advanced features planned for the 'I' included Magnesium alloy (Elektron) structure, integral fuel tanks, tricycle undercarriage, and provision for catapult launching.
- Bolkhovitinov D – A projected heavy bomber with two tandem engine powerplants with a spindle-like fuselage with projecting gondola, mid wing and twin main wheels, wing area of 140m^{2}, maximum weight of 28,000 kg (62,000 lb). A passenger variant was also planned but all work was abandoned at the start of hostilities with Germany in 1941.

== Specifications (Bolkhovitinov S twin-engined) ==
Data from Gunston, Bill. “The Osprey Encyclopaedia of Russian Aircraft 1875–1995”. London, Osprey. 1995. ISBN 1855324059

General characteristics

- Crew: 2
- Length: 13.2 m (43 ft 4 in)
- Wingspan: 13.8 m (45 ft 3.3 in)
- Wing area: 26 m^{2} (280 sq ft)
- Gross weight: 5,652 kg (12,460 lb)
- Powerplant: 2 × Klimov M-103 , 720 kW (960 hp) each

Performance

- Maximum speed: 570 km/h (354 mph, 308 kn)
- Range: 700 km (435 mi, 378 nmi)

Armament

- 1 x 7.62mm ShKAS machine gun on a flexible mount in rear cockpit.
- Later 2 x 12.7mm UBT machine gun on a flexible mount in rear cockpit.
- 400 kg (882 lb) of bombs vertically stored in bomb bay between cockpits.

== See also ==
Aircraft of comparable role, configuration, and era

- EKW C-36

Related lists

- List of aircraft

== Bibliography ==
- Gunston, Bill. “The Osprey Encyclopaedia of Russian Aircraft 1875–1995”. London, Osprey. 1995. ISBN 1-85532-405-9
- Leonard, Herbert (April 1998). "L'extraordinaire Bolkhovitinov S" [The Extraordinaire Bolkhovitinov S]. Avions: Toute l'aéronautique et son histoire (in French) (61): 20–25. ISSN 1243-8650.
- Taylor, Michael J.H. “ Jane's Encyclopedia of Aviation. Studio Editions. London. 1989. ISBN 0-517-69186-8
- (in Russian) Maslov, Mikhail. "Krylatyi Spartak" in: Poligon No.2/2000
