= Tatyana Russiyan-Gubanova =

Soviet helicopter sports athlete

Tatyana Vladimirovna Russiyan-Gubanova
- Татьяна Владимировна Руссиян-Губанова
- Born: 27 August 1930; Moscow, USSR
- Died: 3 October 2012 (aged 82); Moscow, Russia
- Citizenship: Soviet Union; Russia

Tatyana Vladimirovna Russiyan-Gubanova was a Soviet athlete who was a world record holder in helicopter sports. She was an international-class Master of Sports of the USSR and was appointed as a judge in the all-Union category later in her career.

== Biography ==
=== Early life ===
Tatyana was born 27 August 1930 in Moscow. Her father was Vladimir Pavlovich Russiyan and her mother was Vera Pavlovna Polyakova. She had one brother named Arkady.

=== Aviation career ===
She became a student at the Moscow Aviation Institute, becoming a glider pilot at the school's flying club, where she made her first glider flight and parachute jump. She graduated from the institute in 1954.

In 1956, Tatyana was appointed assistant to the lead engineer for flight tests of an experimental design bureau, now called the Mil Moscow Helicopter Plant. There, she received an experimenter's certificate which gave her the authorization to participate in official flights and work at the test station. That same year, she started to study in the helicopter department of the V.P. Chkalov Central Aeroclub and was certified as a helicopter pilot-athlete.

Up until 1985, both as an employee of the Mil Moscow Plant and later the Gromov Flight Research Institute, Tatyana participated in helicopter competitions. In total, Tatyana set eleven world records in helicopter sports during the period of 1960 to 1967 in the Mi-1, Mi-2, Mi-4, and Mi-8 helicopters. Her records include:

- 1959: climbing to 4,140 metres (4,530 yd) in a Mi-1 helicopter without oxygen equipment
- 12 January 1965: 7,524 metres (8,228 yd) altitude record
- 2 August 1965: 49 kilometres (30 mi) range record
- 23 August 1967: 273.51 kilometres per hour (169.95 mph) base airspeed record

In 1963, she entered the graduate school program of the Moscow Aviation Institute in the Department of Helicopter Design. During that time she worked on her dissertation titled "Vortex theory of the main rotor in steep gliding."

Tatyana married Yuri Nikolaevich Gubanov, an associate professor at the Moscow State Technical University in 1972. In 1973, their son Nikolai was born.

=== After retirement ===
Tatyana retired in 1985, but she did not part with aviation. She maintained socially involved in the aviation sector, helped Soviet pilot-athletes master the new Ka-32 helicopter, and worked as a referee at helicopter sports competitions. In 1991, she was awarded the title of judge of the all-Soviet Union category of helicopter sports. In 1992, along with twelve other prominent Soviet aviators, she helped to found the Aviatrix club. From 1992 to 2002 she served as vice president of the club.

She died on 3 October 2012 in Moscow and was buried in the Mitinskoe cemetery. She had been awarded the Order of the Badge of Honor and other medals.
