= Bolkhovitinov DB-A =

1935 bomber aircraft family

DB-A
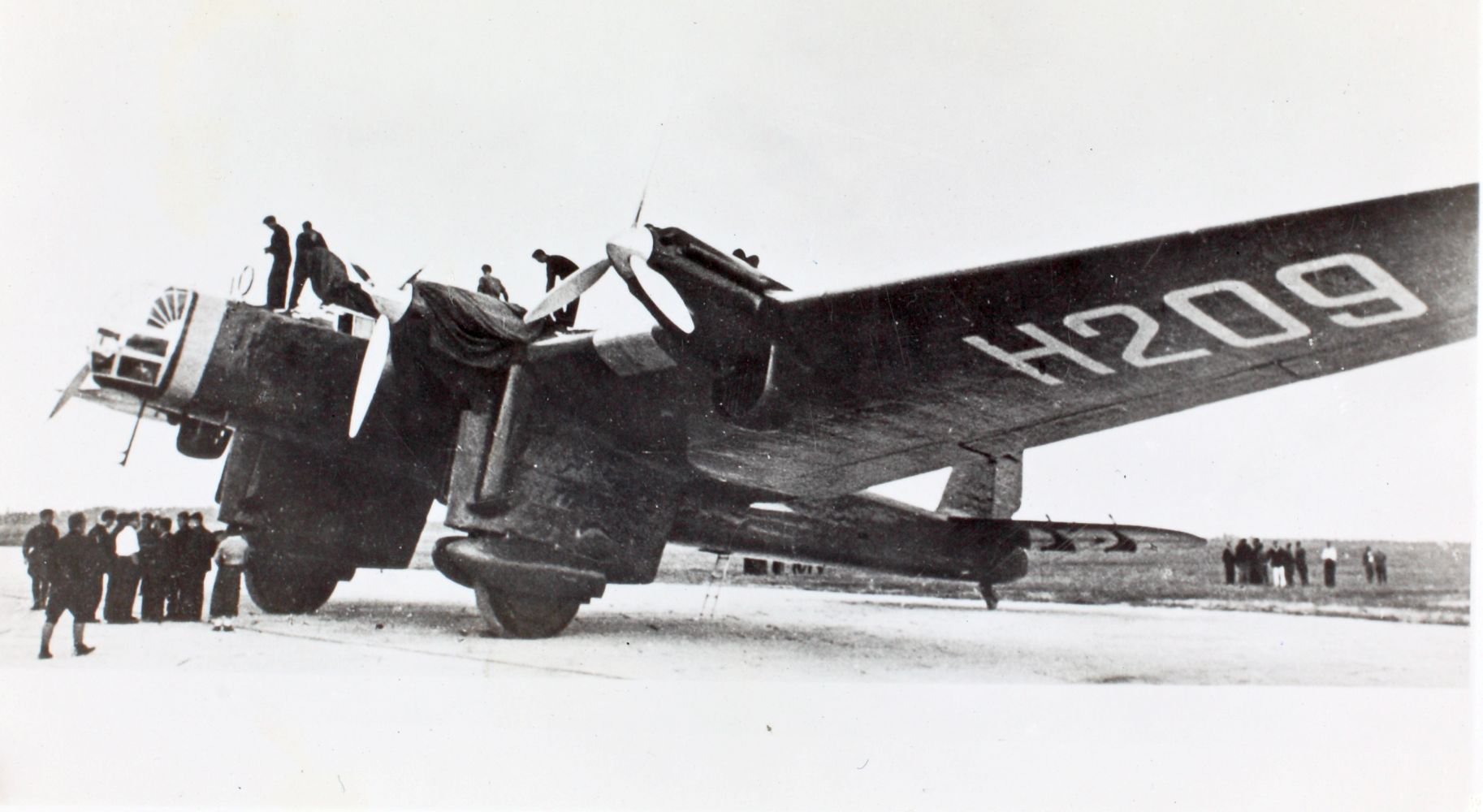

General information
- Type: Bomber
- National origin: USSR
- Designer: Viktor Bolkhovitinov
- Number built: 14

History
- First flight: 2 May 1935

The Bolkhovitinov DB-A (Dal'niy Bombardirovshchik-Akademiya – long-range bomber, academy) was a heavy bomber aircraft designed and built in the USSR from 1934.

== Development ==
Bolkhovitinov became the head of the VVIA design group at the VVA Zhukovsky ( - VVS academy Zhukovsky ) tasked with the design of a replacement for the Tupolev TB-3 heavy bomber. The resulting DB-A was advanced for its day, with stressed skin aluminium alloy construction throughout with clean lines, neatly cowled engines and trousered main undercarriage legs, with fully retracting main-wheels and tail-wheel. The split flaps, undercarriage, nose turret and bomb-bay doors were all operated by a pneumatic system recharged by engine-driven compressors. Flight trials began on 2 May 1935 at Khodinka piloted by N.G. Kastanyev and Ya.N. Moseyev, factory tests were completed by April 1934 and NII testing was carried out in May and June 1935. The excellent performance demonstrated included, sustained flight at an altitude of 2,500 m (8,202 ft) with two engines shut down, and 4,500 km range.

A decision was made to fly nonstop from Moscow to the US, and the DB-A was modified to fly, at an overload weight of 34,700 kg (76,500 lb), carry enough fuel to fly 8,440 km (5,244 miles). The red-painted DB-A prototype under command of Sigizmund Levanevsky departed Shchyelkovo airport on 12 August 1937 on an attempt to fly to Fairbanks, Alaska. After 14 hours, 32 minutes, the crew sent a radio message that one engine had failed and gave a revised ETA for Fairbanks, but nothing further was heard from the DB-A, and the fate of the aircraft and crew remains a mystery.

A second aircraft with increased gross weight, improved airframe, re-designed nose and more power was completed and flown in March 1936 as the DB-2A. An order for 16 aircraft was placed late in 1937, with the designation DBA, but only twelve were completed due to the advent of the TB-7/Pe-8.

== Variants ==
- DB-A – The initial prototype aircraft, with M-34RN engines, lost on a nonstop flight Moscow to Fairbanks, Alaska.
- DB-2A – The second prototype with many detail improvements and M-34RNV engines.
- DBA – Production aircraft ordered in 1937. Sixteen aircraft ordered, but only twelve completed, with M-34FRN engines plus turbo-chargers, rearwards retracting main undercarriage, gunners cockpits in the rear of the inner engine nacelles, and other modifications.
- TK-1 TK ( - heavy cruiser) – Projected escort bomber with 11 crew, 3xShVAK + 3,000 rounds, 5xShKAS + 11,000 rounds and underwing rockets.

== Specifications (DBA) ==
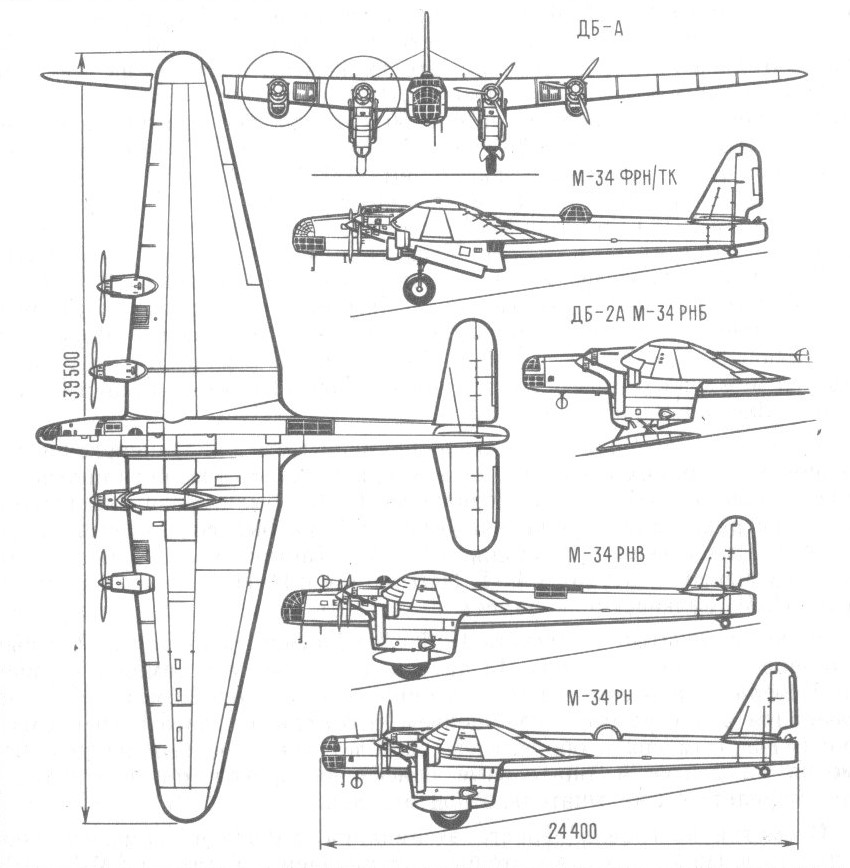
A 3-view of the Bolkhovitinov DBA

Data from Gunston, Bill. “The Osprey Encyclopaedia of Russian Aircraft 1875–1995”. London, Osprey. 1995. ISBN 1-85532-405-9

General characteristics

- Crew: 8
- Length: 24.4 m (80 ft 0.63 in)
- Wingspan: 39.5 m (129 ft 7 in)
- Wing area: 230 m^{2} (2,476 sq ft)
- Empty weight: 16,150 kg (35,605 lb)
- Gross weight: 22,000 kg (48,500 lb)
- Powerplant: 4 × M-34FRN + turbo-chargers , 671.1 kW (900 hp) each

Performance

- Maximum speed: 316 km/h (196.4 mph, 170.7 kn)
- Range: 4,500 km (2,796 mi, 2,430 nmi)
- Service ceiling: 7,730 m (25,360 ft)

Armament

- 2 x ShKAS 7.62mm machine-guns in each of the inner nacelle gun positions.
- 1 x ShKAS 7.62mm machine-guns in nose and tail positions.
- 1 x ShVAK 20mm cannon in the dorsal turret.
- 5,000 kg of bombs in internal bomb-bay.

== See also ==
Aircraft of comparable role, configuration, and era

- Boeing B-17 Flying Fortress
- Dornier Do 19

Related lists

- List of Interwar military aircraft
