= Viktor Bolkhovitinov =

Soviet engineer (1899–1970)

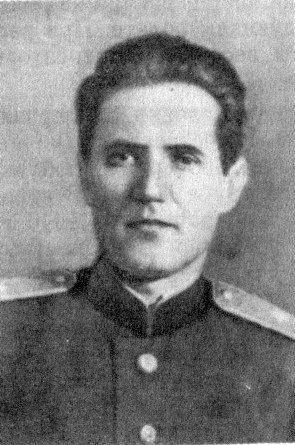

Viktor Fyodorovich Bolkhovitinov (Виктор Фёдорович Болховитинов) (4 February 1899 – 29 January 1970) was a Soviet engineer and team-leader of the developers of the Bereznyak-Isayev BI-1 aircraft. He was also the lead designer of the Bolkhovitinov DB-A bomber named after him.

Bolkhovitinov was one of the first graduates of the Zhukovsky Academy. In 1934, he designed a modernized version of the Tupolev TB-3 bomber called the DB-A (long-range bomber of the academy). On August 12 of 1937, a DB-A attempted to fly over the North Pole to the USA, but the crew perished.

In 1937, he designed the "S" or "Spartak", a small, sleek, high-speed bomber with a long greenhouse canopy. Two contra-rotating props were driven by a pair of Klimov M-103 V-12 engines. Development of the aircraft and its planned variants was discontinued when the war began.

In 1940, Bolkhovitinov became head of his experimental design bureau OKB-293. Based on a plane design by Bereznyak and Bolkhovitinov a few years earlier, and inspired by the attempt of NII-3 to build a ramjet powered plane, Bolkhovitinov decided to build a rocket-powered short-range interceptor. This was the BI-1.

In 1944, A.G. Kostakov, head of the State Institute of Reactive Technology (GIRT) was arrested. GIRT and Bolkhovitinov's OKB-293 were merged into the 'Scientific-Research Institute 1' (NII-1), a new jet propulsion research institute. Bolkhovitinov was head of research in NII-1. In 1946, his division was turned over to Matus Bisnovat, forming Zavod 293.

Bolkhovitinov received a doctorate in 1947 and became a full-time professor at the Zhukovsky Air Force Engineering Academy in 1949.

== See also ==
- Bereznyak-Isayev BI-1
- Bolkhovitinov DB-A

== Bibliography and further reading ==
- Gunston, Bill. “The Osprey Encyclopaedia of Russian Aircraft 1875–1995”. London, Osprey. 1995. ISBN 1-85532-405-9
- Taylor, Michael J.H. . " Jane's Encyclopedia of Aviation. Studio Editions. London. 1989. ISBN 0-517-69186-8
