= Aleksandr Bereznyak =

Russian aircraft and missile designer

Dr. Aleksandr Bereznyak
- Александр Березняк
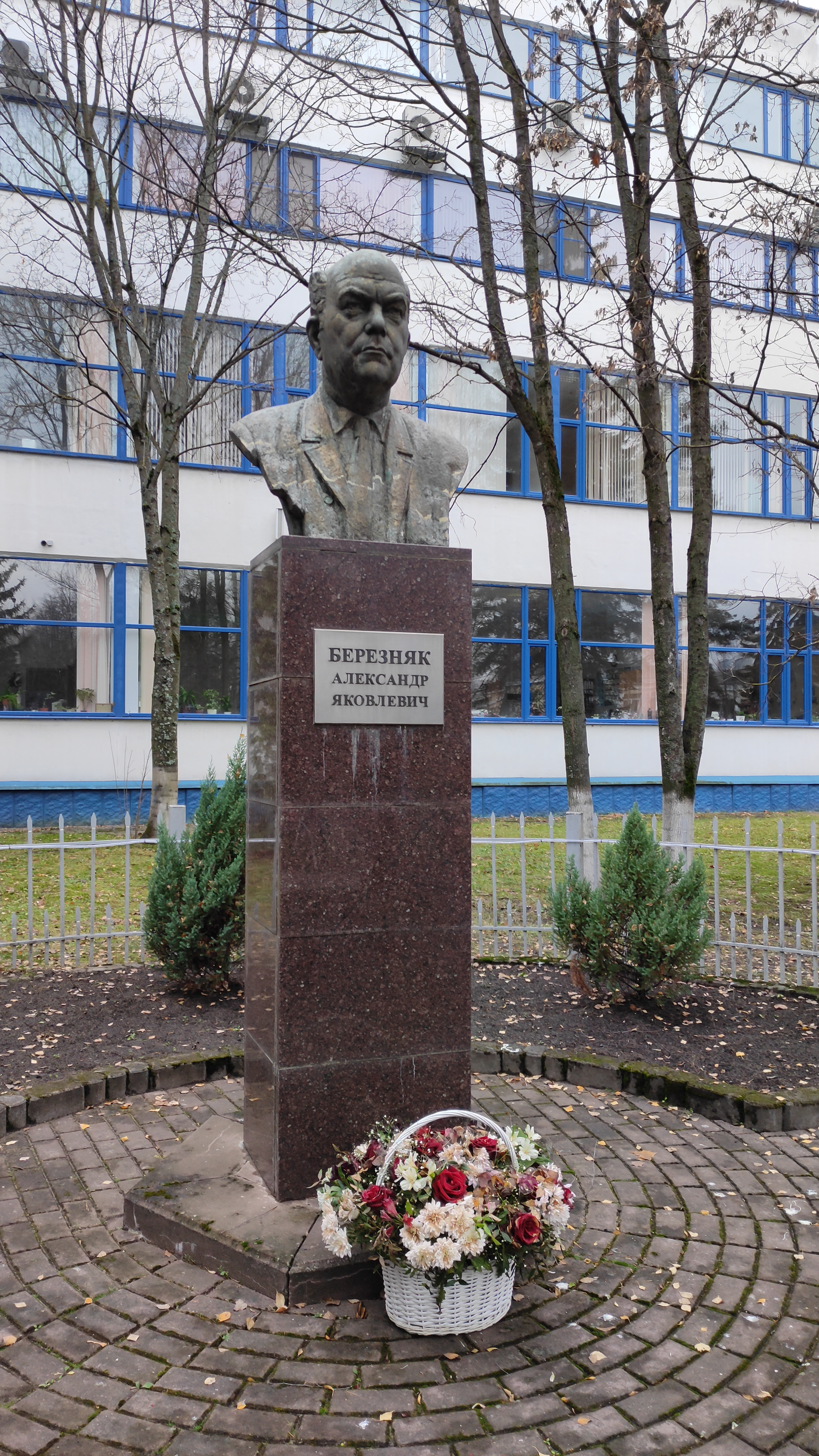
- Bronze memorial bust of Aleksandr Berezniak in Dubna
- Born: Aleksandr Yakovlevich Bereznyak; December 29, 1912; Boyarkino, Ozerski District, Moscow, Russian Empire
- Died: July 7, 1974 (aged 61); Dubna, Moscow, Soviet Union
- Education: Moscow Aviation Institute
- Engineering career
- Discipline: Aircraft and missile design
- Projects: MKB "Raduga"
- Significant design: BI-1
- Awards: Lenin Prize

Signature
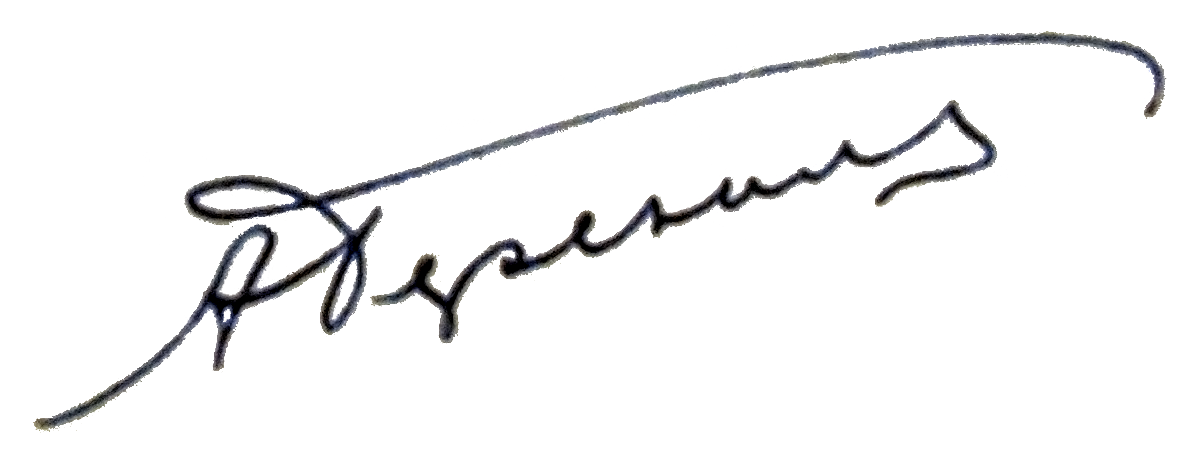

Aleksandr Yakovlevich Bereznyak (Russian: Александр Яковлевич Березняк; 29 December [O.S. 16 December] 1912 – 7 July 1974) was a Soviet aircraft and missile designer. He was the chief designer of MKB Raduga, from March 1957.

== Biography ==
Aleksandr Bereznyak was born on 29 December 1912 in Boyarkino, Ozyorsky District, Moscow Oblast.

He was employed in aviation industries since 1931. Bereznyak was a graduate of the Moscow Aviation Institute named after Sergo Ordzhonikidze (1938). He was an engineer in the experimental design bureau of V. F. Bolkhovitinov. While working in the bureau, he designed the first soviet jet, the BI-1, which was equipped with liquid fuel to power a rocket engine. The BI-1 was created in 1942 in co-operation with A. M. Isaev). He became Vice-chief designer of OKB-2 in 1946, later to become the chief designer in 1957. Other his developments include:

- BI-1 — an early rocket-powered aircraft rocket fighter developed by Bereznyak and Isaev in 1940-1944. It flew after German's experimental He 176, but still was the first Soviet rocket plane. Eight test planes (usually referred as BI-1 — BI-8) were built.
- 302P
- 346 — experimental, trans-sonic speed, 1946.
- 468 — jet, project, 1948–1949.

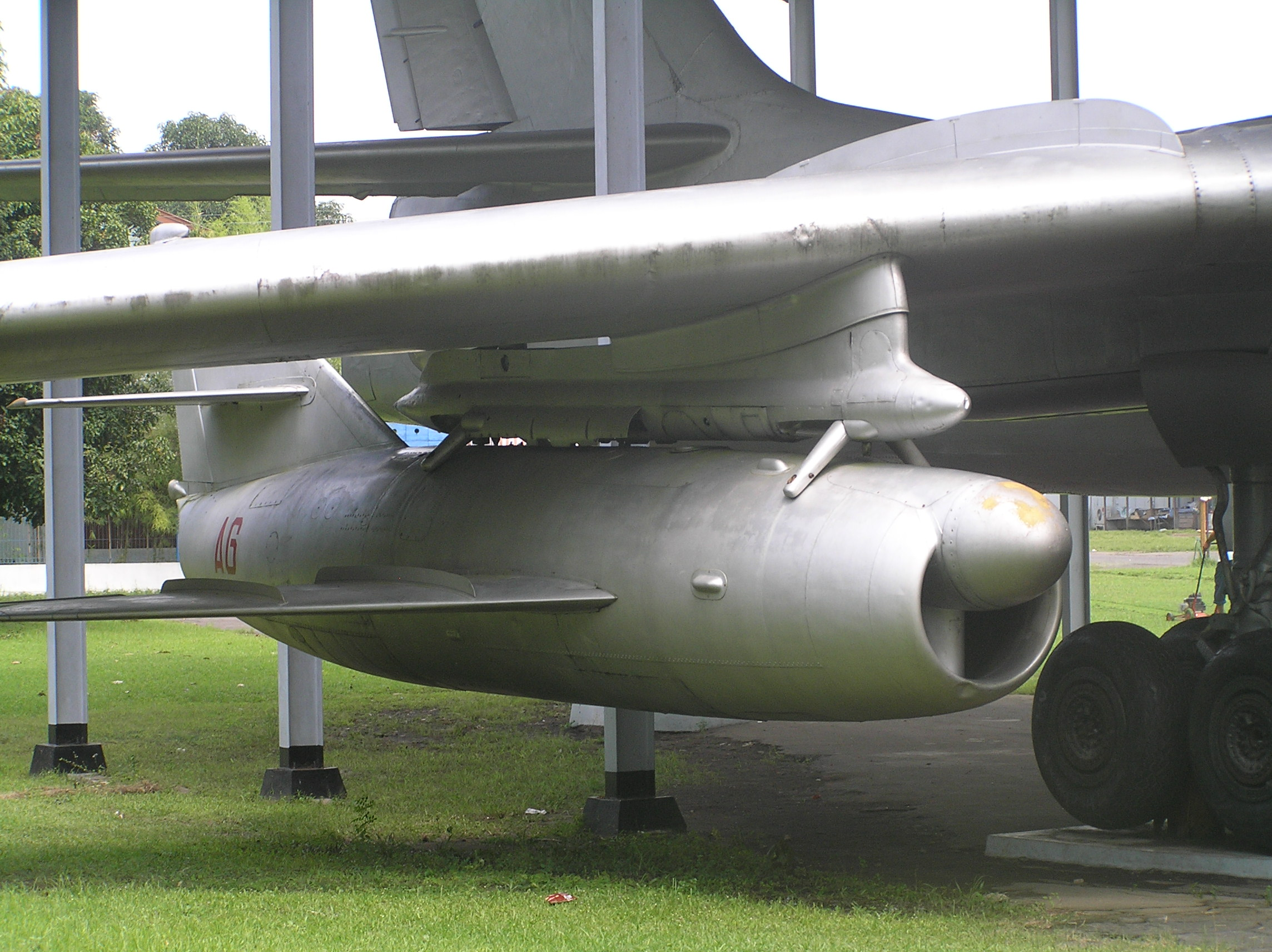
Cruise missile KS-1 under the wing of Tu-16 bomber

In March 1957 he was assigned to lead the newly established MKB Raduga in the village of Ivankovo, Moscow Oblast. This had started in 1951 as Branch 2 of Artem Mikoyan's OKB-155 to produce the KS-1 Komet missile. Raduga specialized in a range of tactical missiles.

Bereznyak was a Doctor in Engineering (1968).

Aleksandr Bereznyak died on 7 July 1974 in Dubna.

== Awards ==
- Merited engineering scientist of the RSFSR (1973)
- Lenin Prize
- USSR State Prize
- Order of Lenin
- Order of the October Revolution
- Order of the Red Banner of Labour and numerous medals

== Memorials ==
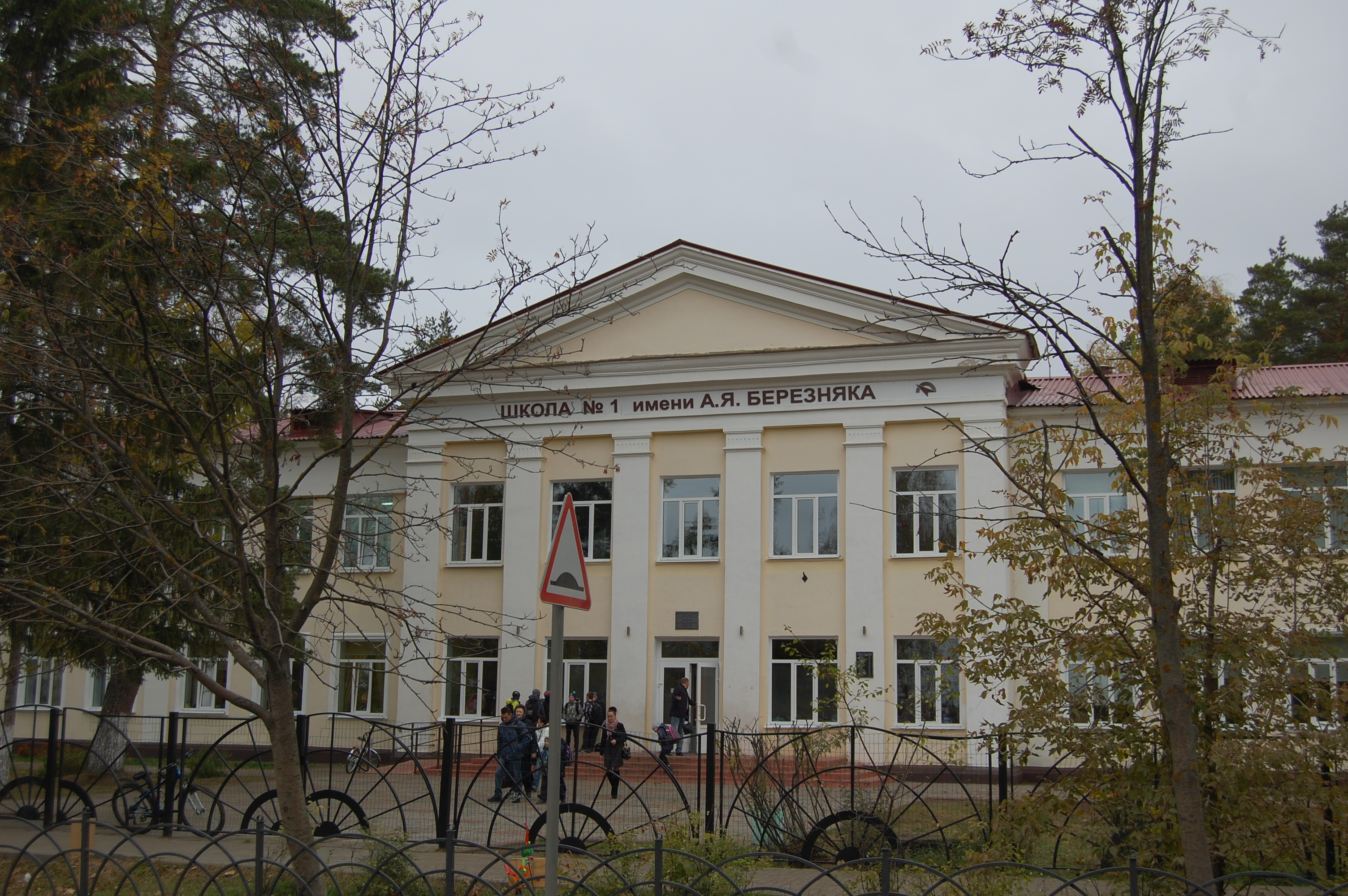
High school No. 1 in Dubna with a name of Alexander Bereznyak engraved at the pediment

- There is a bronze bust of Bereznyak installed at the MKB Raduga headquarters building where he once worked
- A street and a high school in Dubna were named after Bereznyak

== See also ==
- List of Russian inventors
