= Maly Istok =

Maly Istok Малый Исток
- Village
- Location within Vologda Oblast Location within Russia
- Coordinates: 59°07′N 37°32′E
- Country: Russia
- Region: Vologda Oblast
- District: Cherepovetsky District
- Time zone: UTC+3:00

Maly Istok (Russian: Малый Исток) is a rural locality (a village) in Sudskoye Rural Settlement, Cherepovetsky District, Vologda Oblast, Russia. The population was 5 as of 2002. There are 2 streets.

== Geography ==
Maly Istok is located 42 km (26 mi) west of Cherepovets (the district's administrative centre) by road. Maloye Novo is the nearest rural locality.
