= Anatoliy Koroteyev =

Russo-Soviet theoretical physicist (born 1936)

Anatoly Koroteyev
- Born: 22 July 1936 (age 90); Baranovo, Moscow Oblast, Soviet Union
- Education: Moscow Aviation Institute (1959)
- Awards: Order For Merit to the Fatherland, 4th class Order For Merit to the Fatherland, 3rd class Order of Alexander Nevsky USSR State Prize
- Scientific career
- Fields: Physics

Signature
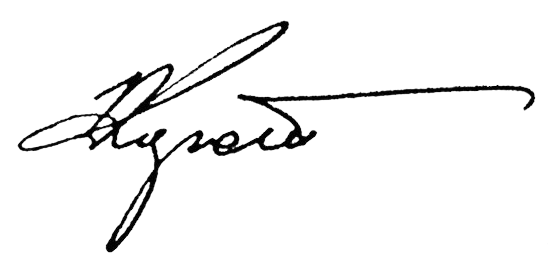

Anatoliy Sazonovich Koroteyev (Russian: Анато́лий Сазо́нович Короте́ев; born 22 July 1936) is a Soviet and Russian theoretical physicist and academic who contributed to the field of rocket engine physics.

== Biography ==
Koroteyev was born in Baranovo, Moscow Oblast. In 1959, he graduated from S. Ordzhonikidze Moscow Aviation Institute.

Anatoliy Koroteev is an expert in propulsion and power systems of space-rocket complexes, generation and application of low-temperature plasma, and obtaining powerful energy flow.

With his direct participation and leadership made major research and development:

- Obtained fundamental results, will create the world's first high-power plasma torches;
- Proposed and implemented a unique system of high-power electron and neutral beams in the atmosphere and gases high blood pressure, which was the basis for the development of innovative systems for defense and economic purposes, the complex of space experiments on the interaction of artificial plasma formations with the ionosphere;
- A complex of research on the development of nuclear power plants and ensure their high ground tests;
- Work began on a new generation of high-power electric propulsion and high specific impulse with a new way to control the thrust vector.

He is

- President of the Russian Academy of Cosmonautics,
- Member of the International Academy of Astronautics
- Member of the board of Rosaviakosmos,
- Member of the Russian Academy of Sciences.

In 2012, Koroteyev announced that a nuclear reactor for space would be developed at the Keldysh Research Centre and tested at Sosnovy Bor.

Koroteyev has created more than 220 inventions and concepts in the fields of rocket engines and power in space.

== Nuclear propulsion advocacy ==
Koroteyev is a proponent of nuclear propulsion. He believes that nuclear propulsion can provide the energy needed for a Mars mission.
