= Korolyov RP-318 =

First Soviet Rocket-Powered Aircraft

The RP-318 or RP-318-1 was USSR's first rocket-powered aircraft or Rocket Glider (Rocketny Planer or Raketoplan) which "RP" stands for in Russian language. Beginning in early 1936, it was first known as RP-218-1 or "Objekt 218" before it was renamed to RP-318-1 in 1938 due to inner reforms of the Rocket Science And Research Institute.

Built at the Reactive Scientific Research Institute in 1936 by Sergei Korolev as an adaptation of his SK-9 glider, the RP-318 was originally designed as a flying laboratory to test rocket engines and ORM-65 designed by Valentin Glushko was the one selected to be used. In 1938, when both Korolev and Glushko were arrested in suspicion of Anti-Soviet activity, development of the RP-318-1 was continued by Alexei Scherbakov (Щербаков, Алексей Яковлевич) and Arvid Pallo (Палло, Арвид Владимирович), culminating in the first powered flight on Feb. 28, 1940. Test pilot V. P. Fedorov (Владимир Павлович Фёдоров) was towed to 2,600 m and cast off at 80 km/h before firing the rocket engine and accelerating the aircraft to 140 km/h and an altitude of 2,900 m. In all, the RP-318 flew nine times before World War II ended its development.

== Specifications ==
Data from The Osprey Encyclopedia of Russian Aircraft 1875–1995

General characteristics

- Crew: one
- Length: 7.44 m (24 ft 5 in)
- Wingspan: 17.0 m (55 ft 9 in)
- Wing area: 22.0 m^{2} (237 sq ft)
- Empty weight: 570 kg (1,257 lb)
- Gross weight: 700 kg (1,543 lb)
- Powerplant: 1 × RDA-1-150 rocket, 0.98 kN (220 lbf) thrust 100 kgf

Performance

- Maximum speed: 140 km/h (87 mph, 76 kn)
