= Bereznyak-Isayev BI-1 =

Experimental WW2-era Soviet rocket-powered interceptor

BI-1
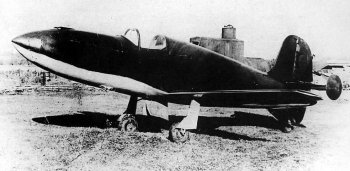
- The BI-1

General information
- Type: Interceptor
- Manufacturer: OKB-293
- Designer: A.Y.Bereznyak and A.M.Isayev
- Primary user: Soviet Air Force
- Number built: 9

History
- First flight: 15 May 1942
- Retired: 9 March 1945

The Bereznyak-Isayev BI-1 was a Soviet short-range rocket-powered interceptor developed during the Second World War.

== Early design ==
Soviet research and development of rocket-powered aircraft began with Sergey Korolev's GIRD-6 project in 1932. His interest in stratospheric flight was also shared by Marshal Mikhail Tukhachevsky who supported this early work. After a long series of unmanned tests of vehicles, Korolev's RP-318-1 rocket aircraft flew on 28 Feb 1940. That Spring, TsAGI (ЦАГИ – Центра́льный аэрогидродинами́ческий институ́т – Tsentralniy Aerogidrodinamicheskiy Institut Central Aerohydrodynamic Institute) hosted a conference for aircraft chief designers on the subject of ramjet and rocket propulsion. On 12 July the Council of People's Commissars called for the development of a high-speed stratospheric aircraft.

Aircraft designer and head of OKB-293, Viktor Fedorovich Bolkhovitinov attended the TsAGI conference along with two of his top engineers, A. Ya. Bereznyak and A. M. Isaev. The young Bereznyak had made an impression in 1938 with a high-speed airplane design that some thought could break the world speed record. Bereznyak and Isaev were excited by the idea of designing a rocket-powered aircraft, and their "patron" Bolkhovitinov approved. By the autumn of 1940, they were able to show fellow engineer Boris Chertok a preliminary design of "Project G". The design, made up mostly from plywood and duralumin had a take-off weight of 1,500 kg (3,300 lb), and they planned to use the new 13.734 kN (3,088 lbf) rocket engine under development in the RNII (Raketnyy Nauchno-Issledovatel'skiy Institut – reaction engine scientific research institute). Chertok was astounded that the aircraft could almost climb vertically.

Bereznyak, Isaev and Chertok visited RNII in March 1941, but the new rocket engine was not working yet. The engine was designed by Leonid Dushkin, who had made the RD-A-150 for the Korolyov RP-318-1. Powered by tractor kerosene and red fuming nitric acid, it fell short of the hoped for 13.74 kN (3,090 lbf) thrust and the D-1-A-1100 was expected to reach 10.8 kN (2,400 lbf). The "A" stood for Nitric Acid ("Azotnokislotny" in Russian), versus K for Liquid Oxygen ("Kislorodny" in Russian), a distinction of unusual importance and controversy among Soviet rocket scientists. Dushkin's turbine propellant pump was causing considerable problems, driven by hot gas and steam from a small combustion chamber fed with rocket propellants mixed with water, but this system was perfected a few years later for the RD-2M engine.

The D-1-A-1100 was built from S54 steel (a 12% chromium alloy). At this point in time, Russian rocket engines were built with typical aviation piston-engine manufacturing technology, weighing 48 kg (106 lb), it could be broken down into discrete forged-steel sections – a conical head with 60 centrifugal injectors, the cylindrical chamber, and the nozzle – joined with bolts and copper gaskets. It was ignited with a nichrome glow plug, later replaced with silicon-carbide and was cooled regeneratively by both propellants, the chamber walls by a spiral flow of incoming fuel (kerosene) and the nozzle section by the flow of oxidizer (Nitric Acid).

== War-time development ==
On 21 June Isaev proposed a new design using compressed air instead of a pump to force propellant to the engine. The next day, Operation Barbarossa brought the Soviet Union into World War II, and the rocket-powered interceptor suddenly became important. Bereznyak and Isaev began a new more detailed design, which they finished in three weeks. On 9 July Bolkhovitinov and his project-G team met with Andrey Kostikov the head of RNII. Dushkin was not happy about the idea of bypassing his fuel pump design, but they backed the plan and cosigned a letter that was eventually shown to Joseph Stalin. After giving a report at the Kremlin, they were ordered to build the aircraft and were given only 35 days to do so. The official order was dated August 1, but work began in late July. The engineers were given leave to visit their families, and then literally lived at the factory until the aircraft was finished.

The new design was called "BI" for Blizhnii Istrebitel (close-range fighter), but the letters were also understood by everyone to stand for its inventors: Bereznyak and Isaev. The original plan to include four machine guns was replaced by a design with a pair of 20 mm (0.79 in) ShVAK cannon. The new aircraft was a low-wing monoplane 6.4 m (21 ft) long, with a wingspan of 6.5 m (21 ft) and an estimated take-off mass of 1,650 kg (3,640 lb) (dry mass 805 kg (1,775 lb) and had a maximum propellant load of 705 kg (1,554 lb). The D-1-A-1100 engine was capable of throttling between 400 kg and 1,100 kg and with 705 kg (1,554 lb)) of propellant, the engine could burn for almost two minutes.

Working around the clock, local furniture workers were employed to build the first two prototypes (BI-1 and BI-2). The skin was 2 mm (0.08 in) plywood with a bonded covering of fabric. The ailerons, elevators and rudder were fabric covered, and the flaps were duralumin. In the forward section were 5 compressed air tanks and 2 kerosene tanks. In the aft were 5 compressed air tanks and three nitric acid tanks.

Pressurized to 60 bar (6,000 kPa), the tanks were made from a high-strength chromium-manganese-silicon steel ("Chromansil") that was not especially resistant to corrosion. Thus, the acid tanks had to be replaced periodically. Compressed air was also used to retract and deploy the landing gear and to power the built-in cannon.

On 1 September 1941 the BI-1 was completed and ready for gliding tests by pilot Boris N. Kudrin as Dushkin's engine was still not ready. A few weeks later, rival aircraft designer A.S. Yakovlev took it upon himself to tow the prototype to TsAGI for windtunnel testing. This alarmed Bolkhovitinov's team, because their patron had a rocky history with Yakovlev, but Alexander Sergeevich and aircraft designer Ilya Florov studied the test results and gave them sound advice for improvements. Yaw instability was corrected by enlarging the rudder and adding two circular plates to the tail horizontal stabilizer.

== Test flights in the Urals ==
In October, both OKB-293 and RNII were evacuated to the Urals, along with most of Moscow's war industry. Bolkhovitinov's team was stationed in Bilimbay, and Dushkin's team in Sverdlovsk, about 60 km (37 mi) away. A test stand was built on the shore of frozen lake Bilimbay, with a dynamometer cradle to hold the BI-1 during engine testing. A new test pilot, Grigory Yakovlevich Bakhchivandzhi, was assigned to the team. Dushkin was increasingly absorbed by other work, including RNII's own rocket aircraft project, the Kostikov-302. He assigned his engineer Arvid V. Pallo to oversee the installation and testing of the rocket engine.

Nitric acid presented a constant problem, corroding parts and causing skin burns and respiratory irritation. Tanks of sodium carbonate solution were kept around to neutralize acid spills. On 20 February 1942, the engine exploded during a full system test. The nozzle section was blasted into the lake, and the engine head struck the back of the pilot's seat, knocking Bakhchivandzhi against the instrument panel and injuring him slightly. Pressurized nitric acid from a broken propellant line drenched Pallo. Fortunately, quick thinking mechanics dunked him head-first into a tank of soda solution. His face was yellow from the characteristic acid staining, but his glasses saved him from being blinded. To protect the pilot in the future, a 5.5 mm (0.22 in) steel plate was added to the back of the seat.

By April 1942, BI-1 was ready for testing at nearby Koltsove airfield. A test commission was formed, with representatives from OKB-293, RNII and the NII VVS (Air Force Scientific Test Institute). On 2 May the pilot let the aircraft lift off to 1 m (3 ft 3 in) under low thrust.

On 15 May at 19:02 (UTC), Bakhchivandzhi made the first real flight of BI-1, reaching an altitude of 840 m (2,760 ft) and a maximum speed of 400 km/h (220 kn; 250 mph). The mass of the aircraft had been reduced to 1,300 kg (2,900 lb) (only 240 kg (530 lb) of nitric acid and 60 kg (130 lb) of kerosene loaded), and the engine was de-rated to 4.9 kN (1,100 lbf). The pilot shut the rocket engine off after about one minute, when a light indicated it was overheating. On landing, the aircraft descended too rapidly because of insufficient forward speed, breaking the main-landing-gear on touchdown. The pilot was unhurt and reported that, aside from the rough landing, the aircraft handled well. The flight lasted only 3 minutes and 9 seconds.

In July, Dushkin recalled Pallo to help work on the "302" rocket-aircraft project, meanwhile Bolkovitinov asked Isaev to take over and master the technology of liquid fuel rocket engines. Isaev got permission to visit Valentin Glushko, the leading Soviet expert on rocket engines, who was then working in a special lab for political prisoners. Glushko taught Isaev the complex techniques of chamber-wall heat transfer calculation and engine design, developed by himself and Fridrikh Tsander in the early 1930s. Isaev's propellant feed system was simple, but it produced an uneven fuel pressure that diminished as compressed air was used up. Bolkovitinov and his engineers wrestled with this problem, designing pressure regulators and even a piston fuel pump driven by compressed air, but none of these improvements were realized.

Too damaged by acid to fly safely, BI-1 was retired and the second prototype BI-2 was made ready. Backchivadzhi made the second flight on 10 Jan 1943, reaching 1,100 m (3,600 ft) but with the engine still throttled back for a maximum speed of 400 km/h (220 kn; 250 mph). The first flight had been with landing gear kept down, and some vibration was observed. For the second flight the landing gear was retracted, and no vibration was observed at the same speed.

The third flight was made on 12 Jan (some sources say 10 Feb) by a temporary test pilot, Konstantin Gruzdev, while Bakhchivandzhi was consulting on Kostikov's "302" project. This time the engine was opened up to full thrust of 10.79 kN (2,430 lb_{f}) and a speed of 675 km/h (364 kn; 419 mph) was achieved and a maximum altitude of 2,190 m (7,190 ft). During the winter, the landing gear was switched from wheels to skis. On one of Gruzdev's flights, one ski broke off during take-off, but he was able to land safely. Bakhchivandzhi returned to make flights in the third prototype BI-3 on 11 March, 14 March and 21 March, reaching a maximum altitude of 4,000 m (13,000 ft) with a maximum rate of climb of 83 m/s (16,300 ft/min).

The 21 March flight was with a full load of ammunition, however most of the BIs did not carry weapons, and although some reports claim that BI-4 was used for live ammunition tests, the guns were never fired in flight. The BI-4 model was also reportedly to be used as the template for mass production of 30 to 50 BI-VS aircraft by Andrey Moskalev's factory, with Moskalev augmenting the twin ShVAK cannon with a load of ten thermite bombs.

On 27 March, during a low-altitude test flight, BI-1, piloted by Bakhchivandzhi, entered a 45-degree dive and crashed into the ground, killing Bakhchivandzhi. The accident put a halt to flight tests, and a lengthy investigation began. Eventually, after wind tunnel testing, it was determined that BI-1 lost control due to transonic effects on the pitch controls / stabilisers. Estimates of Bakhchivandzhi's final velocity range from 800 to 900 km/h (430 to 490 kn; 500 to 560 mph), but the recording instruments were too damaged by the crash for a reliable measurement. The 27 March is considered a black day in Soviet aviation history, also being the date that Yuri Gagarin died in a MiG-15UTI crash. In 1973, Bakhchivandzhi was posthumously elevated to Hero of the Soviet Union.

== Return to Moscow, Isayev's engine ==
In May 1943, OKB-293 returned from its evacuation and set up operation in Khimki, a suburb of Moscow. On May 18, Bolkhovitinov wrote a detailed report "On Rocket Aircraft and Further Prospects". He emphasized the need to study the dangerous regime of "shock stall", and to safely transition through transonic speed and beyond. He proposed the goal of a new rocket aircraft capable of 2,000 km/h (1,100 kn; 1,200 mph).

The next year, Bolkhovitinov had five more aircraft produced, BI-5 through BI-9. In the spring of 1944, BI-6 was fitted with a pair of Igor A. Merkulov's DM-4 ramjet engines. It did not contain a rocket engine, so it was towed into the air. The pilot, Boris Kudrin, flew the BI-6 three times, but was never able to get both ramjets to start at the same time. The aircraft was taken to TsAGI for further tests in the T-101 wind tunnel. The DM-4 auxiliary motor was also tested on the Yak-7b fighter.

With the loss of the D-1-A-1100 engine, Isayev began designing a new engine. The RD-1 was completed and tested in October 1944. The general form of the engine was the same as Dushkin's, but with numerous improvements. Isayev fashioned the sections from 12Kh13 stainless chromium steel (13% chromium, 0.12% carbon content). The head had 85 swirling injectors arranged in a honeycomb pattern that promoted improved fuel-oxidizer mixture. It also used a more reliable electric arc starter instead of a glow plug. Isayev also improved the regenerative cooling, increasing the flow rate around the nozzle.

BI-7 was flown twice with the RD-1 engine, on January 24 and March 9, 1945. Pallo reports there was an emergency with the landing gear during the January flight. In addition to the new engine, various changes were made to the aircraft's design: a larger rudder, smaller false keel, and different wing fillets. During the test flights, the pilot Boris Kudrin, noticed some tailfin flutter. On May 29, the pilot M.K. Baykalov tested the BI-7 in glider mode, without starting the engine, and the flutter was not detected. At this point, the aircraft was too corroded by nitric acid to fly again, and it was retired. To further investigate the flutter problem, BI-5 was modified in the same fashion as BI-7 (but with no engine) and tested in glider flights; however, the problem was not reproduced.

After BI-6 was sent to TsAGI, BI-9 was put into service as a replacement (marked with a "6" on its tail). Flown by Boris Kudrin and M.A. Baikalov, it was used in glider tests with extra payload weight. The fate of BI-8 is unknown.

As turbojet aircraft began to appear in the mid-1940s, the lack of prospects for further development of rocket aircraft in general, and BI in particular, primarily due to limited flight time became evident.

However, the experience accumulated by Bolkhovitinov design bureau became invaluable, and the design bureau alumni went on to become prominent figures in soviet rocket and space technology. Two BI engineers became the founders of two design schools: Bereznyak founded OKB-155, which was the USSR's leading design bureau in development of cruise missiles, and Isayev became the founder of OKB-2, which specialized in low and medium thrust liquid-propellant rocket engines for rockets and space vehicles.

== Powered flights ==
The BI was flown 12 times under power, seven times with Dushkin's D-1-A-1100 engine, three times with the DM-4 ramjets, and twice with Isaev's RD-1 rocket engine.

Date	Model	Pilot	Thrust, kgf	Burn Time, s	Altitude, m	Speed, km/h	Climb, m/s
2 May 1942	BI-1	Bakhchivandzhi	4.9 kN (1,100 lbf)	13	1 m (3 ft 3 in)	–	–
15 May 1942	BI-1	Bakhchivandzhi	5.886 kN (1,323 lbf)	66	840 m (2,760 ft)	400 km/h (220 kn; 250 mph)	23 m/s (4,500 ft/min)
10 Jan 1943	BI-2	Bakhchivandzhi	7.848 kN (1,764 lbf)	63	1,100 m (3,600 ft)	400 km/h (220 kn; 250 mph)	–
12 Jan 1943	BI-2	Gruzdev	10.79 kN (2,430 lbf)	58	2,190 m (7,190 ft)	675 km/h (364 kn; 419 mph)	–
11 Mar 1943	BI-3	Bakhchivandzhi	10.79 kN (2,430 lbf)	80	4,000 m (13,000 ft)	600 km/h (320 kn; 370 mph)	82 m/s (16,100 ft/min)
14 Mar 1943	BI-3	Bakhchivandzhi	10.79 kN (2,430 lbf)	84	3,000 m (9,800 ft)	~650 km/h (350 kn; 400 mph)	–
21 Mar 1943	BI-3	Bakhchivandzhi	10.79 kN (2,430 lbf)	30	3,000 m (9,800 ft)	550 km/h (300 kn; 340 mph)	160 m/s (31,000 ft/min)
27 Mar 1943	BI-3	Bakhchivandzhi	10.79 kN (2,430 lbf)	89	2,000 m (6,600 ft)	>800 km/h (430 kn; 500 mph)	–
Spring 1944	BI-6	Kudrin	–	–	–	–	–
Spring 1944	BI-6	Kudrin	–	–	–	–	–
Spring 1944	BI-6	Kudrin	–	–	–	–	–
24 Jan 1945	BI-7	Kudrin	10.79 kN (2,430 lbf)	72.3	1,250 m (4,100 ft)	587 km/h (317 kn; 365 mph)	87 m/s (17,100 ft/min)
09 Mar 1945	BI-7	Baykalov	10.79 kN (2,430 lbf)	73	3,500 m (11,500 ft)	550 km/h (300 kn; 340 mph)	–

== Operators ==
Soviet Union

- Soviet Air Force

== Specifications ==
Data from

General characteristics

- Crew: 1
- Length: 6.40 m (21 ft 0 in)
- Wingspan: 6.48 m (21 ft 3 in)
- Height: 2.06 m (6 ft 9 in)
- Wing area: 7 m^{2} (75 sq ft)
- Empty weight: 805 kg (1,775 lb)
- Max takeoff weight: 1,650 kg (3,638 lb)
- Powerplant: 1 × Dushkin D-1A-1100 liquid-fuel rocket motor, 10.79 kN (2,430 lbf) thrust

Performance

- Maximum speed: 800 km/h (500 mph, 430 kn) estimated
- Service ceiling: 12,000 m (39,000 ft)

Armament

- Guns: two nose-mounted 20 mm ShVAK cannon, 45 rounds per gun
- Rockets: two RS-82 rockets

== See also ==
- List of aircraft of World War II
- Messerschmitt Me 163 Komet
