= Rocket-powered aircraft =

Aircraft which uses a rocket engine for propulsion

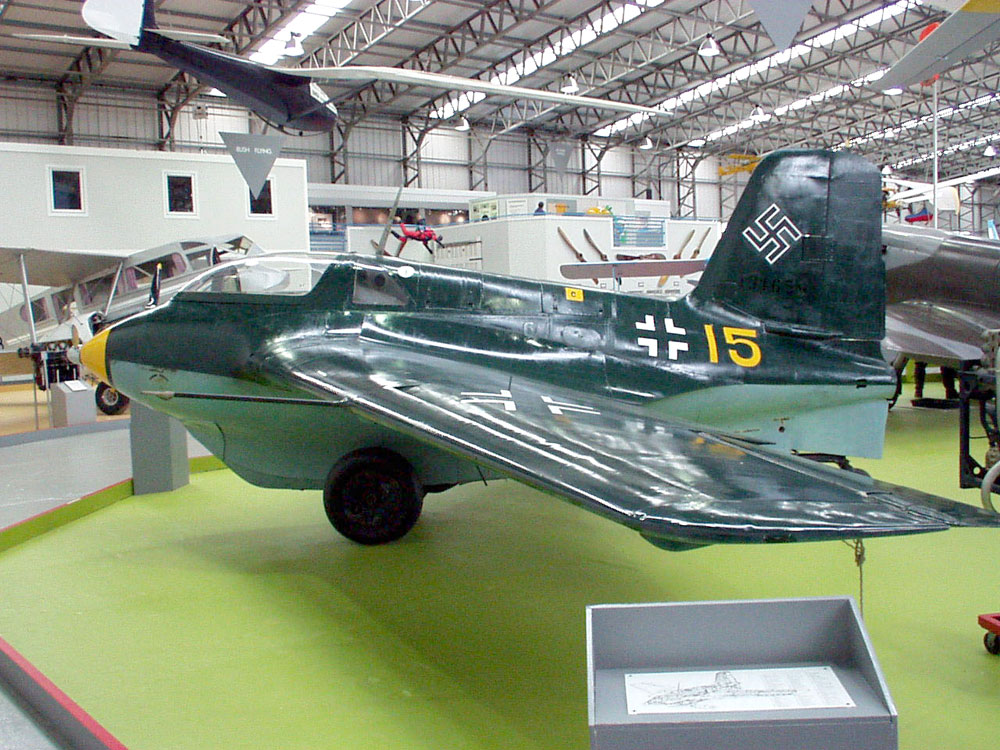
Messerschmitt Me 163 Komet, the only operational rocket-powered fighter aircraft

A rocket-powered aircraft or rocket plane is an aircraft that uses a rocket engine for propulsion, sometimes in addition to airbreathing jet engines. Rocket planes can achieve much higher speeds than similarly sized jet aircraft, but typically for at most a few minutes of powered operation, followed by a gliding flight. Unhindered by the need for oxygen from the atmosphere, they are suitable for very high-altitude flight. They are also capable of delivering much higher acceleration and shorter takeoffs. Many rocket aircraft may be drop launched from transport planes, as take-off from ground may leave them with insufficient time to reach high altitudes.

Rockets have been used simply to assist the main propulsion in the form of jet assisted take off (JATO) also known as rocket-assisted takeoff (RATO or RATOG). Not all rocket planes take off in the conventional manner for planes. Some types have been air-launched from another plane, while other types have taken off vertically – nose in the air and tail to the ground ("tail-sitters").

Because of the use of heavy propellants and other practical difficulties of operating rockets, the majority of rocket planes have been built for experimental or research use, as interceptor fighters and space aircraft.

== History ==
=== Background ===
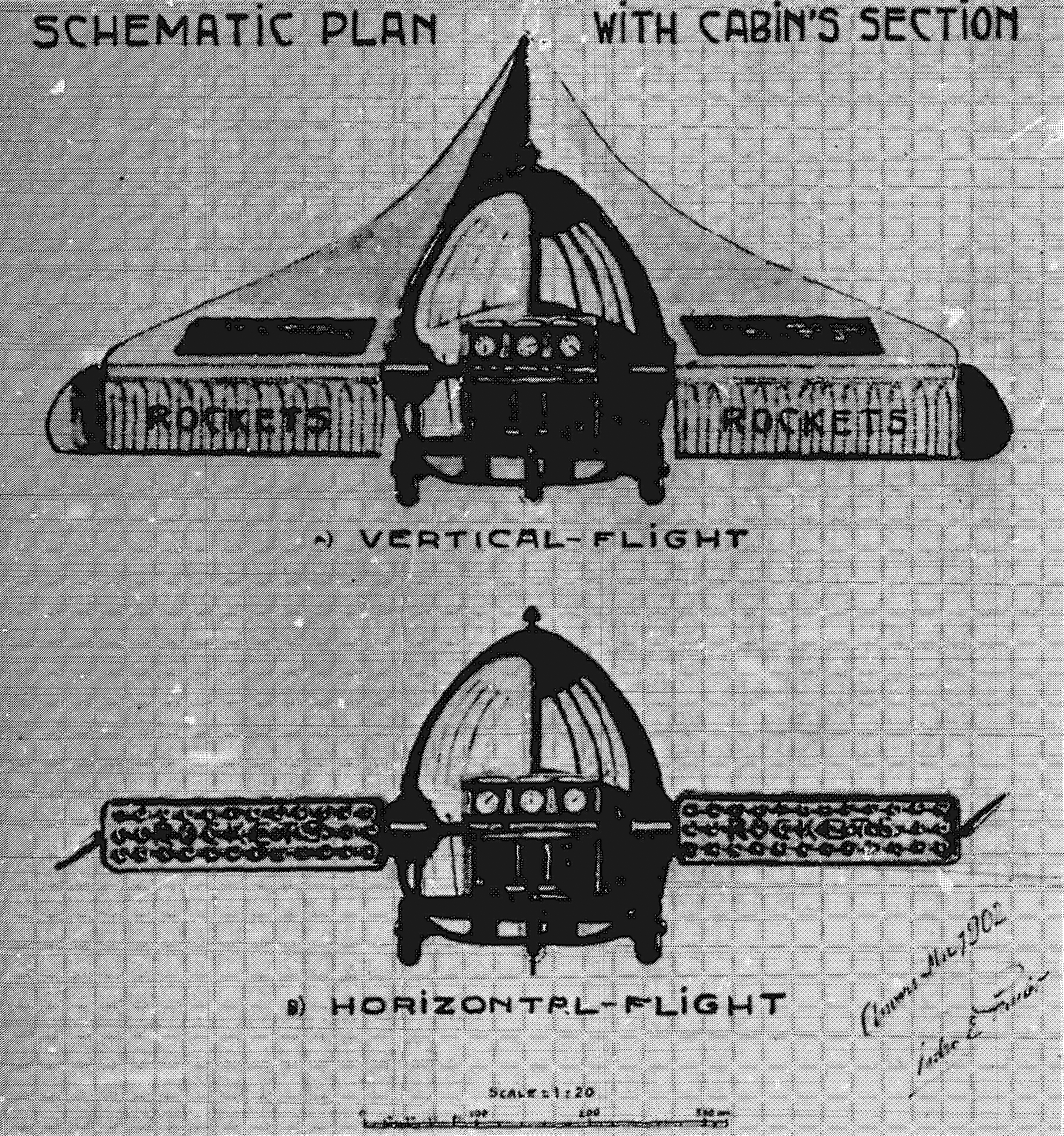
Pedro Paulet's Avión Torpedo of 1902, featuring a canopy fixed to a delta tiltwing for horizontal or vertical flight.

Peruvian polymath Pedro Paulet conceptualized the Avión Torpedo in 1902 – a liquid-propellant rocket-powered aircraft that featured a canopy fixed to a delta tiltwing – spending decades seeking donors for the aircraft while serving as a diplomat in Europe and Latin America. Paulet's concept of using liquid-propellant was decades ahead of rocket engineers at the time who utilized black powder as a propellant. Reports of Paulet's rocket aircraft concept first appeared in 1927 after Charles Lindbergh crossed the Atlantic Ocean in an aircraft. Paulet publicly criticized Austrian rocket pioneer Max Valier's proposal about a rocket-powered aircraft completing the journey faster using black powder, arguing that his liquid-propellant rocket aircraft from thirty years earlier would be a better option.

Paulet would go on to visit the German rocket association Verein für Raumschiffahrt (VfR) and on March 15, 1928, Valier applauded Paulet's liquid-propelled rocket design in the VfR publication Die Rakete, saying the engine had "amazing power". In May 1928, Paulet was present to observe the demonstration of a rocket car of the Opel RAK program of Fritz von Opel and Max Valier, and after meeting with the German rocket enthusiasts. VfR members began to view black powder as a hindrance for rocket propulsion, with Valier himself believing that Paulet's engine was necessary for future rocket development. Paulet would soon be approached by Nazi Germany to help develop rocket technology, though he refused to assist and never shared the formula for his propellant. The Nazi government would then appropriate Paulet's work while a Soviet spy in the VfR, Alexander Boris Scherchevsky, possibly shared plans with the Soviet Union.

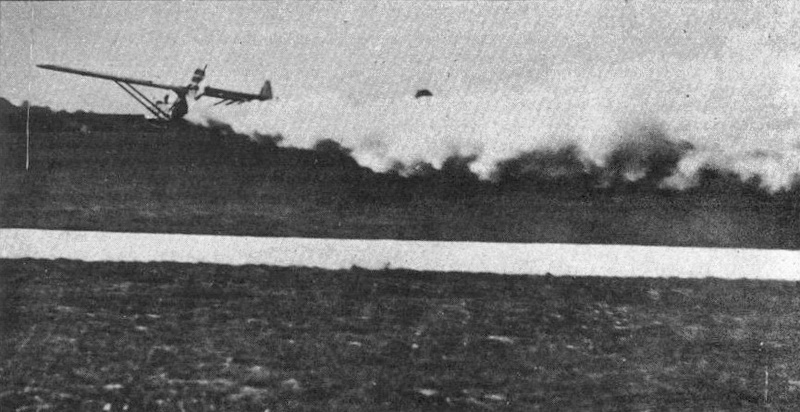
Opel RAK.1 - World's first public manned flight of a rocket plane on September 30, 1929.

On 11 June 1928, as part of the Opel RAK program of Fritz von Opel and Max Valier, Lippisch Ente became the first aircraft to fly under rocket power. During the following year, the Opel RAK.1 became the first purpose-built rocket plane to fly with Fritz von Opel himself as the pilot. The Opel RAK.1 flight is also considered the world's first public flight of a manned rocket plane since it took place before a large crowd and with world media in attendance.

On 28 June 1931, another ground-breaking rocket flight was conducted by the Italian aviator and inventor Ettore Cattaneo, who created another privately built rocket plane. It flew and landed without particular problems. Following this flight, the King of Italy Victor Emmanuel III appointed Cattaneo count of Taliedo; due to his pioneering role in rocket flight, his likeness is displayed in the Space Museum of Saint Petersburg as well as in the Museum of Science and Tech of Milan.

=== World War II ===
The Heinkel He 176 was the world's first aircraft to be propelled solely by a liquid-propellant rocket engine. It performed its first powered flight on 20 June 1939 with Erich Warsitz at the controls. The He 176, while demonstrated to the Reich Air Ministry did not attract much official support, leading to Heinkel abandoning its rocket propulsion endeavours; the sole aircraft was briefly displayed at the Berlin Air Museum and was destroyed by an Allied bombing raid in 1943.

The first rocket plane ever to be mass-produced was the Messerschmitt Me 163 Komet interceptor, introduced by Germany towards the final years of the conflict as one of several efforts to develop effective rocket-powered aircraft. The Luftwaffe's first dedicated Me 163 fighter wing, Jagdgeschwader 400 (JG 400) was established in 1944, and was principally tasked with providing additional protection for the manufacturing plants producing synthetic gasoline, which were prominent targets for Allied air raids. It was planned to station further defensive units of rocket fighters around Berlin, the Ruhr and the German Bight.

A typical Me 163 tactic was to fly vertically upward through the bombers at 9,000 m (30,000 ft), climb to 10,700–12,000 m (35,100–39,400 ft), then dive through the formation again, firing as they went. This approach afforded the pilot two brief chances to fire a few rounds from his cannons before gliding back to his airfield. It was often difficult to supply the needed fuel for operating the rocket motors. In the final days of the Third Reich, the Me 163 was withdrawn in favor of the more successful Messerschmitt Me 262, which used jet propulsion instead.

Other German rocket-powered aircraft were pursued as well, including the Bachem Ba 349 "Natter", a vertical takeoff manned rocket interceptor aircraft that flew in prototype form. Further projects never reached the prototype stage, such as the Zeppelin Rammer, the Fliegende Panzerfaust and the Focke-Wulf Volksjäger. Having a much larger size than any other rocket-powered endeavor of the conflict, the Silbervogel antipodal bomber spaceplane was planned by the Germans, however, later calculations showed that design would not have worked, instead being destroyed during reentry. The Me 163 Komet is the only type of rocket-powered fighter to see combat in history, and one of only two types of rocket-powered aircraft seeing any combat.

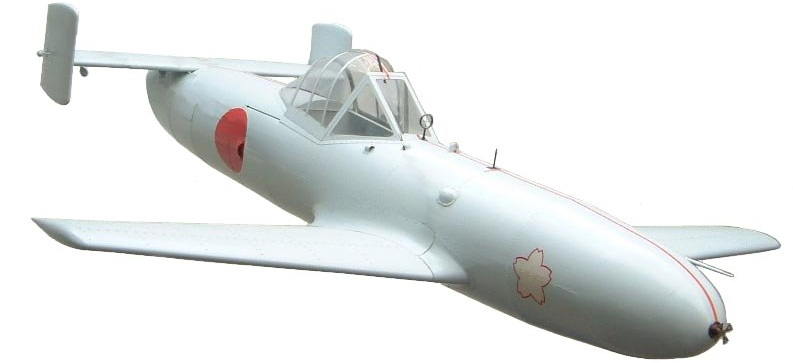
A Yokosuka MXY-7 Ohka replica at the Yasukuni Shrine Yūshūkan war museum

Japan, who was allied to Nazi Germany, secured the design schematics of the Me 163 Komet. After considerable effort, it successfully established its own production capability, which was used to produce a limited number of its own copies, known as the Mitsubishi J8M, which performed its first powered flight on 7 July 1945. Furthermore, Japan attempted to develop its own domestically designed rocket-powered interceptor, the Mizuno Shinryu; neither the J8M or the Shinryu ever saw combat. The Japanese also produced approximately 850 Yokosuka MXY-7 Ohka rocket-powered suicide attack aircraft during the Second World War, a number were deployed in the Battle of Okinawa. Postwar analysis concluded that the Ohka's impact was negligible, and that no U.S. Navy capital ships had been hit during the attacks due to the effective defensive tactics that were employed.

Other experimental aircraft included the Soviet Bereznyak-Isayev BI-1 that flew in 1942 while the Northrop XP-79 was originally planned with rocket engines but switched to jet engines for its first and only flight in 1945. A rocket-assisted P-51D Mustang was developed by North American Aviation that could attain 515 mph (829 km/h). The engine ran on red fuming nitric acid and aniline which was stored in two 75-US-gallon (280 L) under wing drop tanks. The plane was tested in flight in April 1945. The rocket engine could run for about a minute. Similarly, the Messerschmitt Me 262 "Heimatschützer" series used a combination of rocket and jet propulsion to allow for shorter take-offs, faster climb rate, and even greater speeds.

=== Cold War era ===
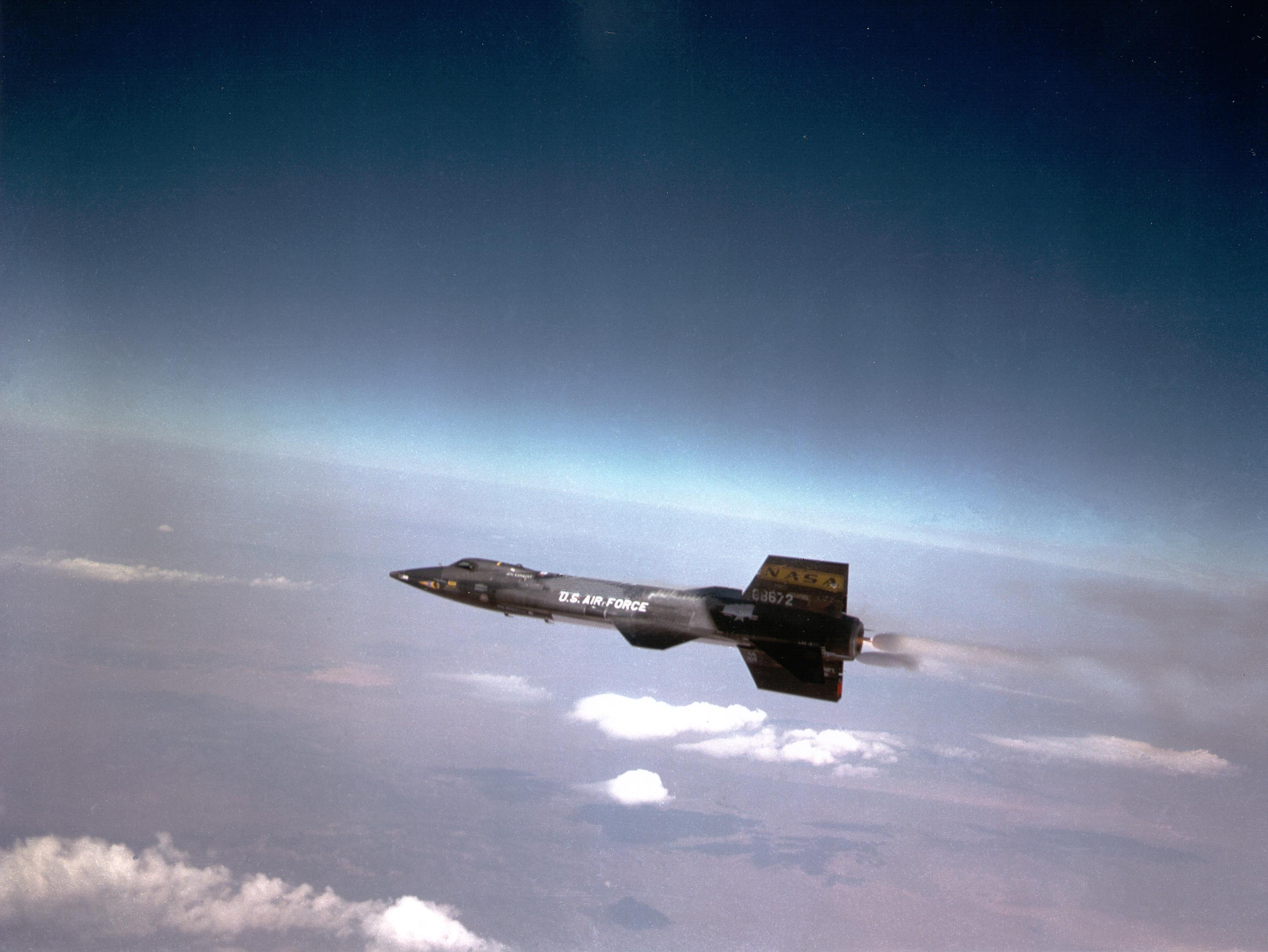
The X-15's XLR99 rocket engine used ammonia and liquid oxygen.

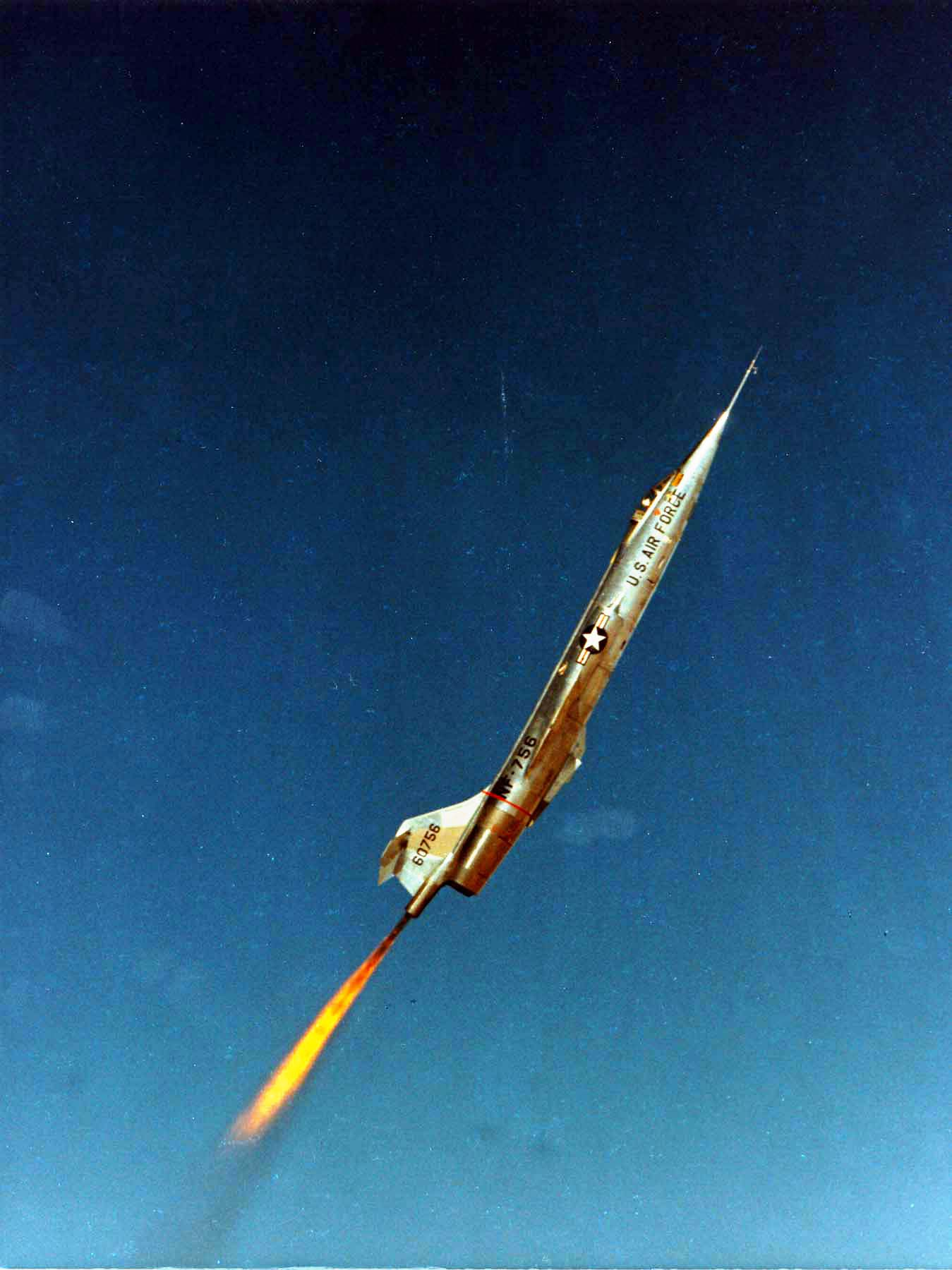
The Lockheed NF-104A had rocket and air-breathing turbojet engines, shown here climbing with rocket power. The rocket used hydrogen peroxide and JP-4 jet fuel.

During 1946, the Soviet Mikoyan-Gurevich I-270 was constructed in response to a Soviet Air Forces requirement issued during the previous year for a rocket-powered interceptor aircraft in the point-defence role. The design of the I-270 incorporated several pieces of technology that had been developed by Sergei Korolev between 1932 and 1943.

During 1947, a key milestone in aviation history was reached by the rocket-powered Bell X-1, which became the first aircraft to break the speed of sound in level flight, and would be the first of a series of NACA/NASA rocket-powered aircraft. Amongst these experimental aircraft were the North American X-15 and X-15A2 designs, which were operated for around a decade and eventually attained a maximum speed of Mach 6.7 as well as a peak altitude in excess of 100 km, setting new records in the process.

During the 1950s, the British developed several mixed power designs to cover the performance gap that existed in then-current turbojet designs. The rocket was the main engine for delivering the speed and height required for high speed interception of high level bombers and the turbojet gave increased fuel economy in other parts of flight, most notably to ensure that the aircraft was able to make a powered landing rather than risking an unpredictable gliding return. One design was the Avro 720, which was primarily propelled by an 8,000 lbf (36 kN) Armstrong Siddeley Screamer rocket engine that ran on kerosene fuel mixed with liquid oxygen as the oxidizing agent. Work on the Avro 720 was abandoned shortly after the Air Ministry's decision to terminate development of the Screamer rocket engine, allegedly due to official concerns regarding the practicality of using liquid oxygen, which boils at -183 °C (90 K) and is a fire hazard, within an operational environment.

Work reached a more advanced stage with the Avro 720's rival, the Saunders-Roe SR.53. The propulsion system of this aircraft used hydrogen peroxide as a combined fuel and oxidiser, which was viewed as less problematic than the Avro 720's liquid oxygen. On 16 May 1957, Squadron Leader John Booth DFC was at the controls of XD145 for the first test flight, following up with the maiden flight of the second prototype XD151, on 6 December 1957. During the subsequent flight test programme, these two prototypes flew 56 separate test flights, during which a maximum speed of Mach 1.33 was recorded. Furthermore, since late 1953, Saunders-Roe had worked upon a derivative of the SR.53, which was separately designated as the SR.177; the principal change was the presence of an onboard radar, lacking on the SR.53 and the Avro 720 as it not being a requirement of the specification, but left the pilot dependent on his own vision other than radio-based directions supplied from ground-based radar control.

Both the SR.53 and its SR.177 cousin were relatively close to attain production status when wider political factors bore down upon the programme. During 1957, a massive re-thinking of air defence philosophy in Britain occurred, which was embodied in the 1957 Defence White Paper. This paper called for manned combat aircraft to be replaced by missiles, and thus the prospects of an order from the RAF evaporated overnight. While both the Royal Navy and Germany remained potential customers for the SR.177, the confidence of both parties was shaken by the move. Further factors, such as the Lockheed bribery scandals to compel overseas nations to order the Lockheed F-104 Starfighter, also served to undermine the sale prospects of the SR.177, costing potential customers such as Germany and Japan.

Throughout the late 1940s and 1950s, the French Air Staff also had considerable interest in rocket-powered aircraft. According to author Michel van Pelt, French Air Force officials were against a pure rocket-powered flight but favoured a mixed-propulsion approach, using a combination of rocket and turbojet engines. While the Société d'Etudes pour la Propulsion par Réaction (SEPR) set about developing France's own domestic rocket engines, the French aircraft manufacturer SNCASE was aware of the French Air Force's keenness for a capable point defence interceptor aircraft, and thus begun work on the SNCASE SE.212 Durandal. In comparison to other French mixed-power experimental aircraft, such as the competing SNCASO Trident prototype interceptor, it was a heavier aircraft, intended to fly primarily on its jet engine rather than its rocket motor. A pair of prototype aircraft were constructed; on 20 April 1956, the first performed its maiden flight, initially flying only using jet power. It was the second prototype that first made use of the rocket motor during April 1957. During flight testing, a maximum speed of 1,444 kilometres per hour (897 mph) was attained at an altitude of12,300 metres (40,400 ft), even without using the extra power of the rocket motor; this rose to 1667 km/h at 11,800 m while the rocket was active. A total of 45 test flights were performed prior to work on the programme being terminated.

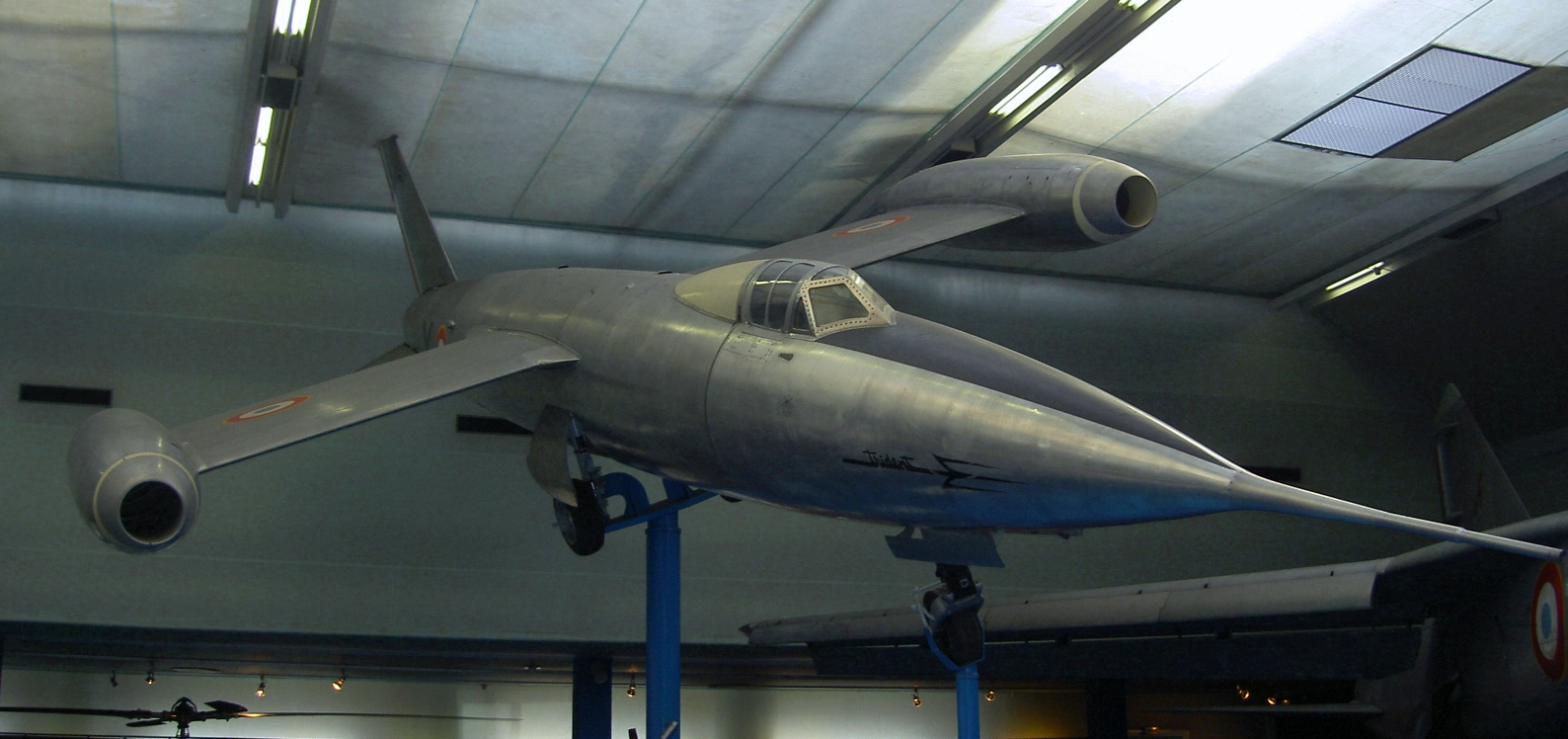
A SNCASO Trident on static display

At the request of the French Air Staff, the French aircraft company SNCASO also developed its own point defence interceptor, the SNCASO Trident. It was primarily powered by a single SEPR-built rocket engine and augmented with a set of wing-tip mounted turbojet engines; operationally, both rocket and turbojet engines were to be used to perform a rapid climb and interception at high altitudes, while the jet engines alone would be used to return to base. On 2 March 1953, the first prototype Trident I conducted the type's maiden flight; flown by test pilot Jacques Guignard, the aircraft used the entire length of the runway to get airborne, being powered only by its turbojet engines. On 1 September 1953, second Trident I prototype crashed during its first flight after struggling to gain altitude after takeoff and colliding with an electricity pylon. Despite the loss, the French Air Force were impressed by the Trident's performance and were keen to have an improved model into service. On 21 May 1957, the first Trident II, 001, was destroyed during a test flight out of Centre d'Essais en Vol (Flight Test Center); caused when highly volatile rocket fuel and oxidiser, Furaline ( C_{13}H_{12}N_{2}O) and Nitric acid (HNO_{3}) respectively, accidentally mixed and exploded, resulting in the death of test pilot Charles Goujon. Two months later, all work was halted on the programme.

The advancement of the turbojet engine output, the advent of missiles, and advances in radar had made a return to mixed power unnecessary.

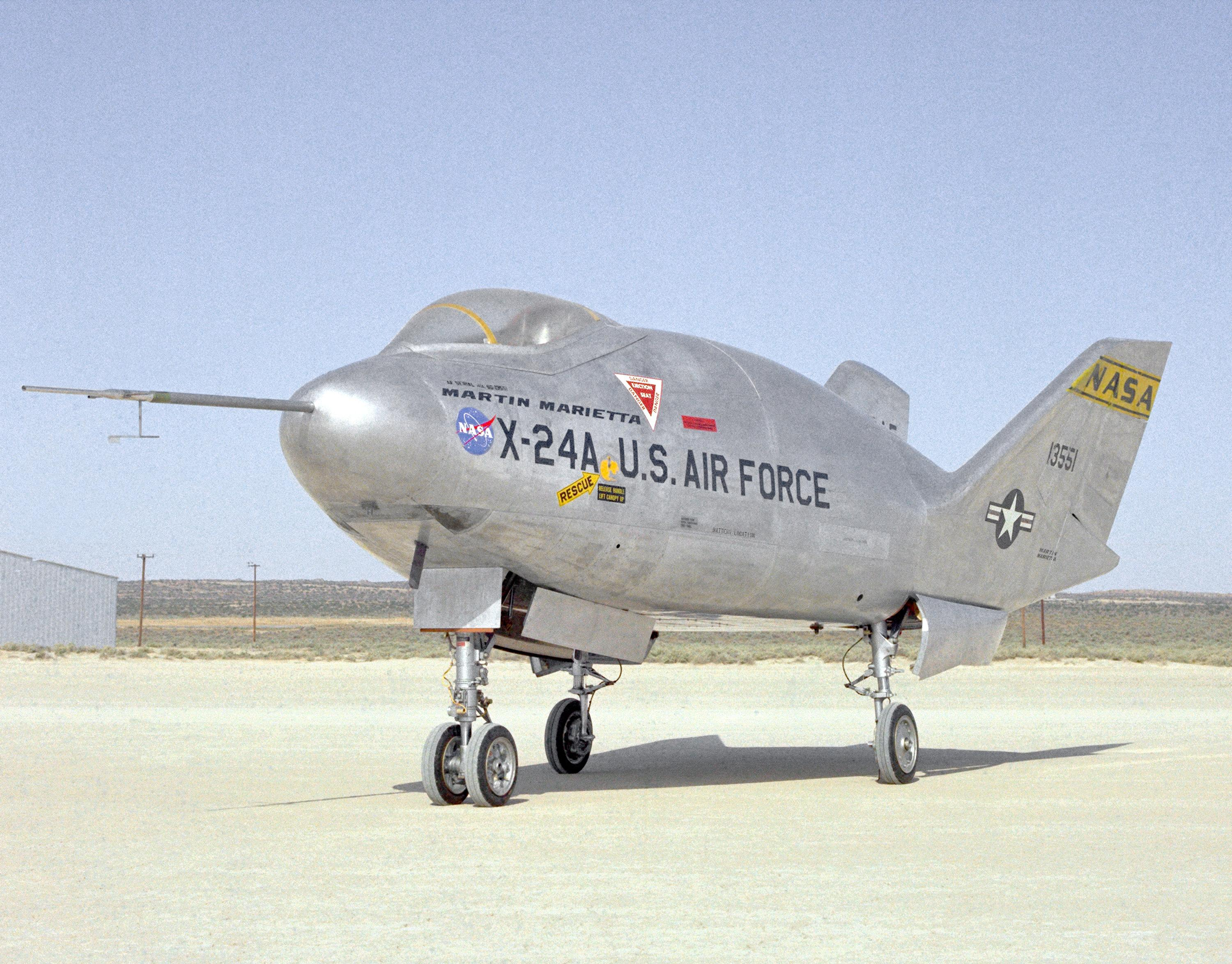
The Martin Aircraft Company X-24 lifting body built as part of a 1963 to 1975 experimental US military program

The development of Soviet rockets and satellites was the driving force behind the development of NASA's space program. In the early 1960s, American research into the Boeing X-20 Dyna-Soar spaceplane was cancelled due to lack of purpose; later the studies contributed to the Space Shuttle, which in turn motivated the Soviet Buran. Another similar program was ISINGLASS which was to be a rocket plane launched from a Boeing B-52 Stratofortress carrier, which was intended to achieve Mach 22, but this was never funded. ISINGLASS was intended to overfly the USSR. No images of the vehicle configuration have been released.

The Lunar Landing Research Vehicle was a mixed powered vehicle- a jet engine cancelled 5/6 of the force due to gravity, and the rocket power was able to simulate the Apollo lunar lander.

Various versions of the Reaction Motors XLR11 rocket engine powered the X-1 and X-15, but also the Martin Marietta X-24A, Martin Marietta X-24B, Northrop HL-10, Northrop M2-F2, Northrop M2-F3, and the Republic XF-91 Thunderceptor, either as a primary or auxiliary engine.

=== Post Cold War era ===
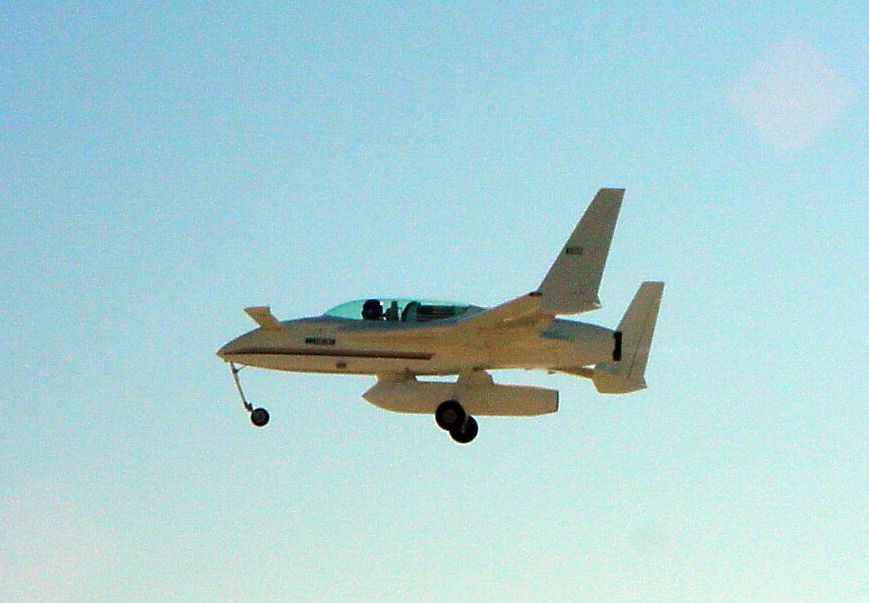
EZ-Rocket research aircraft

The EZ-Rocket research and test airplane was first flown in 2001. After evaluating the EZ-Rocket, the Rocket Racing League developed three separate rocket racer aircraft over the following decade.

During 2003, another privately developed rocket-powered aircraft performed its first flight. SpaceShipOne functions both as a rocket-powered aircraft—with wings and aerodynamic control surfaces—as well as a spaceplane—with RCS thrusters for control in the vacuum of space. For their work, the SpaceShipOne team were awarded the Space Achievement Award.

In April 2019, the Chinese company Space Transportation carried out a test of a 3,700-kilogram technology demonstrator named Jiageng-1. The 8.7-meter-long plane has a wingspan of 2.5 meters and it is a part of development of the larger, future Tianxing-I-1 vertical takeoff, horizontal landing reusable launch vehicle.

==== Planned rocket-powered aircraft ====
- Zero Emission Hyper Sonic Transport

== See also ==
- List of rocket aircraft
- List of vehicle speed records
- Rocket Racing League (RRL)
- Zero-length launch, launching air-breathing aircraft with rockets
