= SNCASE SE.212 Durandal =

French jet and rocket mixed-power experimental fighter aircraft

SE.212 Durandal
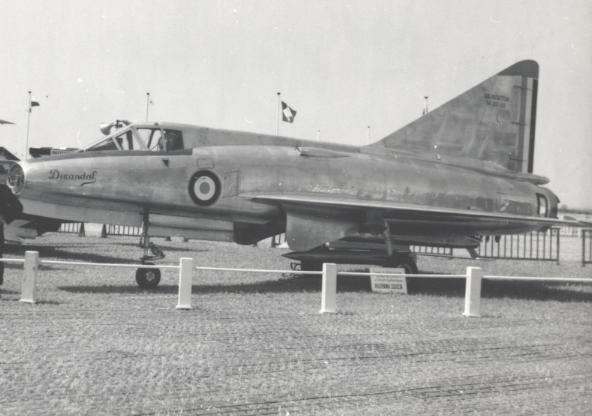
- SE-212 Durandal No.02 at the Paris Air Show in May 1957 with AA20 rocket beneath the aircraft

General information
- Type: Interceptor
- Manufacturer: SNCASE
- Status: Experimental
- Number built: 2

History
- First flight: 20 April 1956

The SNCASE SE.212 Durandal was a French jet and rocket mixed-power experimental fighter aircraft of the mid-1950s.

It was designed by the French aircraft manufacturer SNCASE during the early 1950s, who were keen to exploit the potential advantages of a mixed-power propulsion system. In parallel, as part of a wider effort to re-build French military power and to furnish France with advanced, new domestically-produced designs, the French Air Force sought a supersonic-capable point defence interceptor aircraft with which to equip itself. Accordingly, the resulting design, designated SE.212 Durandal by the company, was at one stage specialised towards its application as a dedicated point-defence interceptor aircraft.

The Durandal's development was in parallel to a number of lightweight fighter-bomber projects that were promoted in response to NATO's NATO Basic Military Requirement 1. While SNCASE did opt to submit their design for evaluation towards satisfying this requirement, the more conventional Fiat G.91 was picked as the competition's winner instead, subsequently being manufactured in quantity for numerous nations. Accordingly, the Durandal became one of a number of "also-rans." The first prototype performed its maiden flight on 20 April 1956. Despite promising results demonstrated by the prototypes during tests, the project was ultimately unordered and all work was terminated by the company during 1957.

== Design and development ==
During the late 1940s, following the end of the Second World War, France quickly set about its recovery and the rebuilding of its military, particularly the French Air Force. During this time, the French Air Staff sought both to become a strong military force once again and to foster the indigenous development of advanced military aircraft. In this respect, one area of high interest for prospective development was the relatively new field of rocket-powered aircraft. According to author Michel van Pelt, French Air Force officials were against a pure rocket-powered fight, akin to the wartime-era Messerschmitt Me 163 Komet, but instead favoured a mixed-propulsion approach, using a combination of rocket and turbojet engines. During 1944, a new company, Société d'Etudes pour la Propulsion par Réaction (SEPR), was founded for the purpose of developing France's own domestic rocket engines.

The French aircraft manufacturer SNCASE was not only keen to develop and produce cutting-edge designs, but was aware that the French Air Force was keen for aviation companies to investigate the development of a capable and advanced point defence interceptor aircraft, with a view towards inducted such an aircraft into its squadrons. Accordingly, as early as late 1951, SNCASE commenced work on design studies for a lightweight interceptor aircraft that harnessed multiple propulsion systems; the company subsequently tasked its design team, headed by the aeronautical engineer Pierre Satre, to undertake development of such an aircraft. Formal development of what would be designated the SE.212 Durandal by SNCASE was started during December 1963.

The design team produced a compact aircraft furnished with a 60° delta wing and powered by a single SNECMA Atar 101F turbojet engine, equipped with afterburning. It was intended for the Durandal to take off while being solely powered by this conventional engine; once it had attained a high altitude, the aircraft's speed could then be boosted by the ignition of its auxiliary engine, a single SEPR 75 rocket motor. The fuel pumps for the rocket motor were driven by the jet engine, thus the latter had to be kept running for the former to be ignited or to continue to power the aircraft.

In comparison to other French mixed-power experimental aircraft, such as the competing SNCASO Trident prototype interceptor, it was a heavier aircraft, intended to fly primarily on its jet engine rather than its rocket motor. Its armament was to consist of a single AA.20 air-to-air missile, which was to be carried underneath the fuselage's centreline; an alternative armament configuration involved a pair of 30 mm DEFA cannon or 24 68mm SNEB rockets. According to aviation author Michel van Pelt, the limited missile armament of only one AA.20 was a major point of criticism of the Durandal, and contributed to its cancellation.

A pair of prototype aircraft were constructed; on 20 April 1956, the first performed its maiden flight at Istres, initially flying only using jet power, the rocket motor was not installed at all. On 30 March 1957, the second Durandal conducted its first flight, joining the test programme shortly thereafter. It was the second prototype that first made use of the rocket motor during April 1957. During flight testing, a maximum speed of 1,444 kilometres per hour (897 mph) was attained at an altitude of12,300 metres (40,400 ft), even without using the extra power of the rocket motor; this rose to 1667 km/h at 11,800 m while the rocket was active. These tests were performed without any armament being installed. A total of 45 test flights were performed prior to work on the programme being terminated.

The second Durandal, aircraft No.02, was statically displayed at the Paris Air Show at Paris Le Bourget Airport during May 1957 with the AA.20 missile underneath the aircraft.

== Cancellation ==
During May 1957, the decision was made to terminate development of the Durandal prior to any production aircraft being constructed; no further activity on the programme was ever taken. van Pelt notes that the programme's critics had derided the ability to carry only one AA.20 as giving such an interceptor only a single opportunity to attack, after which it would be defenseless; this criticism was equally applied to the Dassault Mirage I, the precursor to the successful Dassault Mirage III family of fighter aircraft. Furthermore, it was allegedly felt at the time that such a capability would be barely more than that of surface-to-air missiles. According to aviation author Bill Gunston, the cancellation of several French mixed-power aircraft around this time had been heavily influenced by political developments in the neighbouring United Kingdom, specifically the announcement of the 1957 Defence White Paper by the British Defence Minister, Duncan Sandys, in which a large number of advanced aircraft development programmes, including their own mixed-power interceptor programme, had been abruptly aborted in favour of concentrating upon the development of missiles instead.

== Preservation ==
Sections of the first aircraft have been held in store by the Musée de l'Air et de l'Espace at Le Bourget.

== Specification ==
Data from

General characteristics

- Crew: 1
- Length: 12.07 m (39 ft 7 in)
- Wingspan: 7.44 m (24 ft 5 in)
- Wing area: 29.60 m^{2} (318.6 sq ft)
- Empty weight: 4,575 kg (10,086 lb)
- Gross weight: 6,700 kg (14,771 lb)
- Powerplant: 1 × SNECMA Atar 101F turbojet, 43 kN (9,700 lbf) with afterburner
- Powerplant: 1 × SEPR 75 rocket engine, 7.35 kN (1,653 lbf) thrust

Performance

- Maximum speed: 1,667 km/h (1,036 mph, 900 kn) with rocket at 11,800 m (36,300 ft)
- Maximum speed: Mach 1.57
- Rate of climb: 200 m/s (39,000 ft/min)

Armament

- One Nord AA.20 or
- Two 30 mm DEFA cannon or
- 24 x 68 mm SNEB rockets

== See also ==
Aircraft of comparable role, configuration, and era

- Avro 720
- Republic XF-91 Thunderceptor
- SNCASO Trident
- Saunders-Roe SR.53
