= Société d'Etudes pour la Propulsion par Réaction =

French research and manufacturing company

Société d'Études pour la Propulsion par Réaction (SEPR)
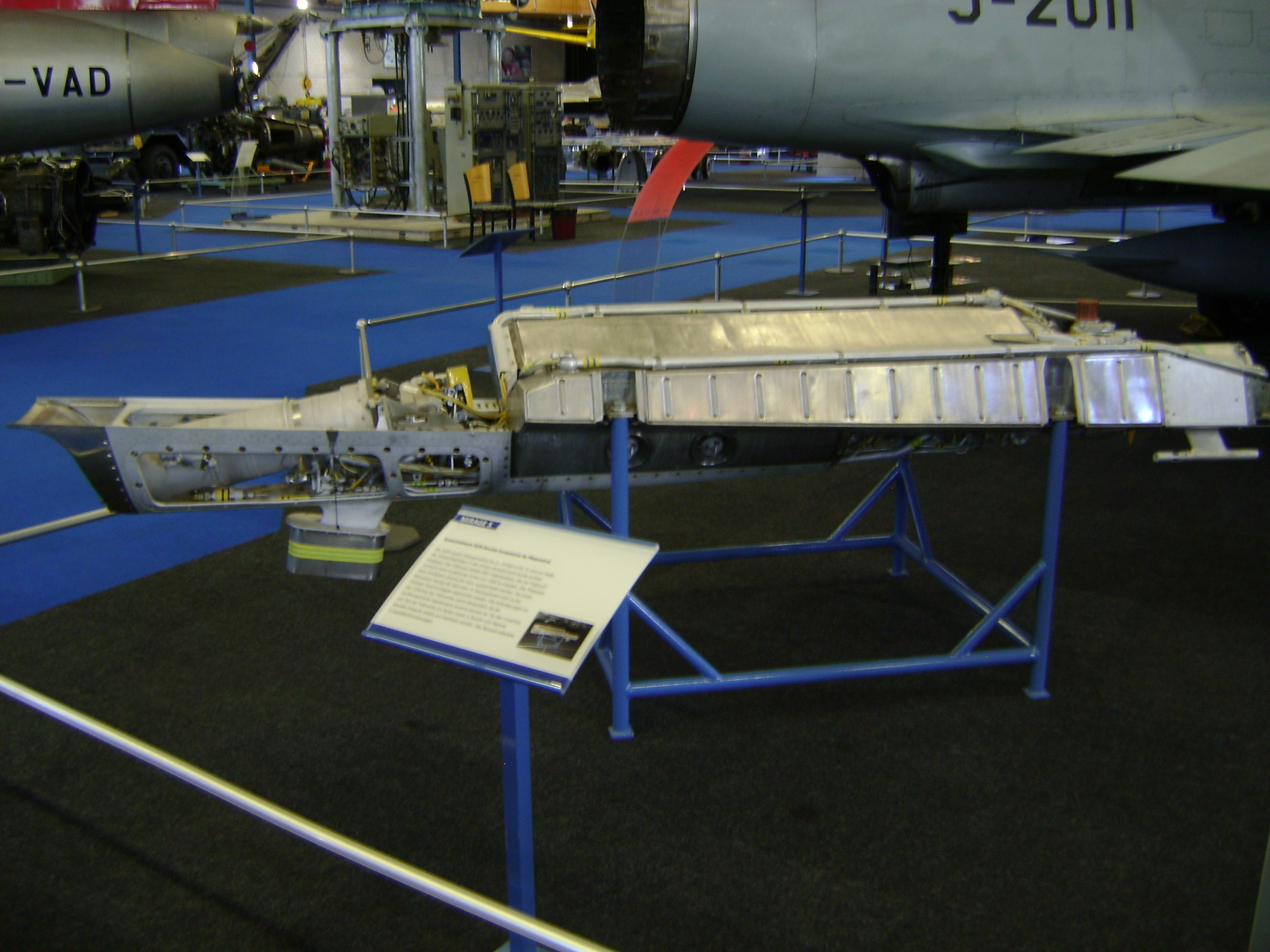
- A SEPR 841 rocket pack for the Mirage IIIC. Yellow and green banding on the acid oxidiser pipework, and the dump port, may be seen.
- Type: Research, development and manufacturing company
- Industry: Aero-engine manufacture
- Founded: 1944 in Paris, France
- Headquarters: 37 rue des Acacias, 17th arrondissement of Paris, France
- Key people: Jean Volpert
- Products: liquid-fuelled and solid-fuelled rocket engines
- Owner: French Government

The Société d'Études pour la Propulsion par Réaction (SEPR) (in French: Jet Propulsion Research Company) was a French research and manufacturing company that specialised in the development of liquid-fuelled rocket engines. It was active throughout the Cold War period.

The company was founded in 1944 amid the Liberation of France to pursue the domestic development of rocket propulsion. In the late 1940s, French Air Force interest in rocketry aligned with SEPR's ambitions and led to the second prototype of the Sud-Ouest Espadon being fitted with one of its SEPR 25 rocket engines; it became the first European aircraft to break the sound barrier in level flight on 15 December 1953. Follow-on efforts led to the SNCASO SO.9000 Trident mixed-power interceptor, which attained Mach 1.8 as well as a peak altitude of 20,000 metres (65,000 ft), but ultimately never progressed being test flights. The production standard Dassault Mirage III interceptor could also be outfitted with the liquid-fuelled SEPR 841 rocket engine that functioned an auxiliary power unit. SEPR proceeded to develop numerous rocket engines for various applications.

== Background ==
Société d'Etudes pour la Propulsion par Réaction (SEPR) was established in 1944 with the ambition of developing and producing domestic rocket engines for France. The company benefitted from wider political trends during the late 1940s as, following the end of the Second World War, France urgently set about the rebuilding of its military, particularly the French Air Force, which involved the indigenous development of numerous advanced military aircraft. Specifically, the service was highly interested was the relatively new field of rocket-powered aircraft, which had been ushered in by the wartime-era Messerschmitt Me 163 Komet interceptor. According to the aviation historian Michel van Pelt, French Air Force officials were typically opposed to a pure rocket-powered fighter, instead favoured a mixed-propulsion approach, which used a combination of rocket and turbojet engines. At the time, these ambitions pre-dated the development of either practical afterburners or turbofan powerplants, and thus the means to improve aircraft performance were more limited. The investigation of rocket propulsion was limited not only to France, but several other nations, including the UK. (Note: See the Saunders-Roe SR.53)

== Applications ==
=== Mixed-power ===
French studies for mixed-power interceptors formally started in 1948. In aid of these studies, it was promptly decided to convert the second prototype of the Sud-Ouest Espadon to use mixed-propulsion; specifically, it was furnished with a SEPR 25 rocket beneath the tail pipe. It was powered by Furaline (C_{13}H_{12}N_{2}O) rocket fuel and nitric acid oxidizer, which was carried in a tank between the intake and the rocket. The aircraft first flew on 28 December 1949, solely using its turbojet, and made its first rocket-powered flight on 10 June 1952. It became the first European aircraft to break the sound barrier in level flight on 15 December 1953. French officials were encouraged by this progress and issued a request to French industry for a high-speed lightweight interceptor aircraft that was powered by either turbojet or rocket propulsion, or some combination thereof. Amongst the performance stipulations were a top speed of at least Mach 1.3 and a relatively high climb rate; it ultimately led to the SNCASO SO.9000 Trident mixed-power interceptor.

By 1953, the SNCASO Trident was in flight; during flight testing, it attained a maximum recorded speed of Mach 1.8 as well as a peak altitude of 20,000 metres (65,000 ft). The Trident was an unconventional aircraft, being equipped with a single three-chambered SEPR rocket engine as the main engine, assisted for take-off and low altitude flight by two Turbomeca Marboré turbojets. (Note: Rockets are at their least efficient at slow speeds and low altitudes as their high exhaust velocity is less efficient and their nozzles are mis-matched to the higher pressure at low altitude.) The Trident was difficult to handle on the low-powered turbojets alone and was thirsty for fuel on rocket power. This primary use of the rocket was not repeated in the future: later aircraft would be jet-powered, with the rocket reserved for high-speed dashes. Later rockets would also be considerably less powerful than the Trident's SEPR 48–1.

A development for the Trident II aircraft was the two chamber SEPR 631 engine. The two chambers could be fired separately. Although not throttleable, this did give a half-thrust setting.

Engine	Aircraft	First flight (With rocket power)	Thrust	
SEPR 25	SO.6025 Espadon	1952		
SEPR 251	SO.6026 Espadon	1953		
SEPR 481	SO.9000 Trident I	1954	37.75 kilonewtons (8,490 lb_{f}); 3×12.25 kilonewtons (2,750 lb_{f}) chambers	
SEPR 631	SO.9050 Trident II	1955		Two chambers, independently selected to allow partial thrust
SEPR 66	MD.550 Mystère-Delta	1955	15 kilonewtons (3,300 lbf)	
SEPR 75	SNCASE SE.212 Durandal	1957	7.35 kilonewtons (1,650 lb_{f})	
SEPR 841	Dassault Mirage IIIC	1960	15.0 kilonewtons (3,370 lbf) / 7.3 kilonewtons (1,650 lbf) selectable 16 kilonewtons (3,700 lbf) at 52,000 ft	
SEPR 844	Dassault Mirage IIIC		15.0 kilonewtons (3,370 lbf) / 7.3 kilonewtons (1,650 lbf) selectable 16 kilonewtons (3,700 lbf) at 52,000 ft	Kerosene-fuelled version of the 84-1

=== Mirage ===
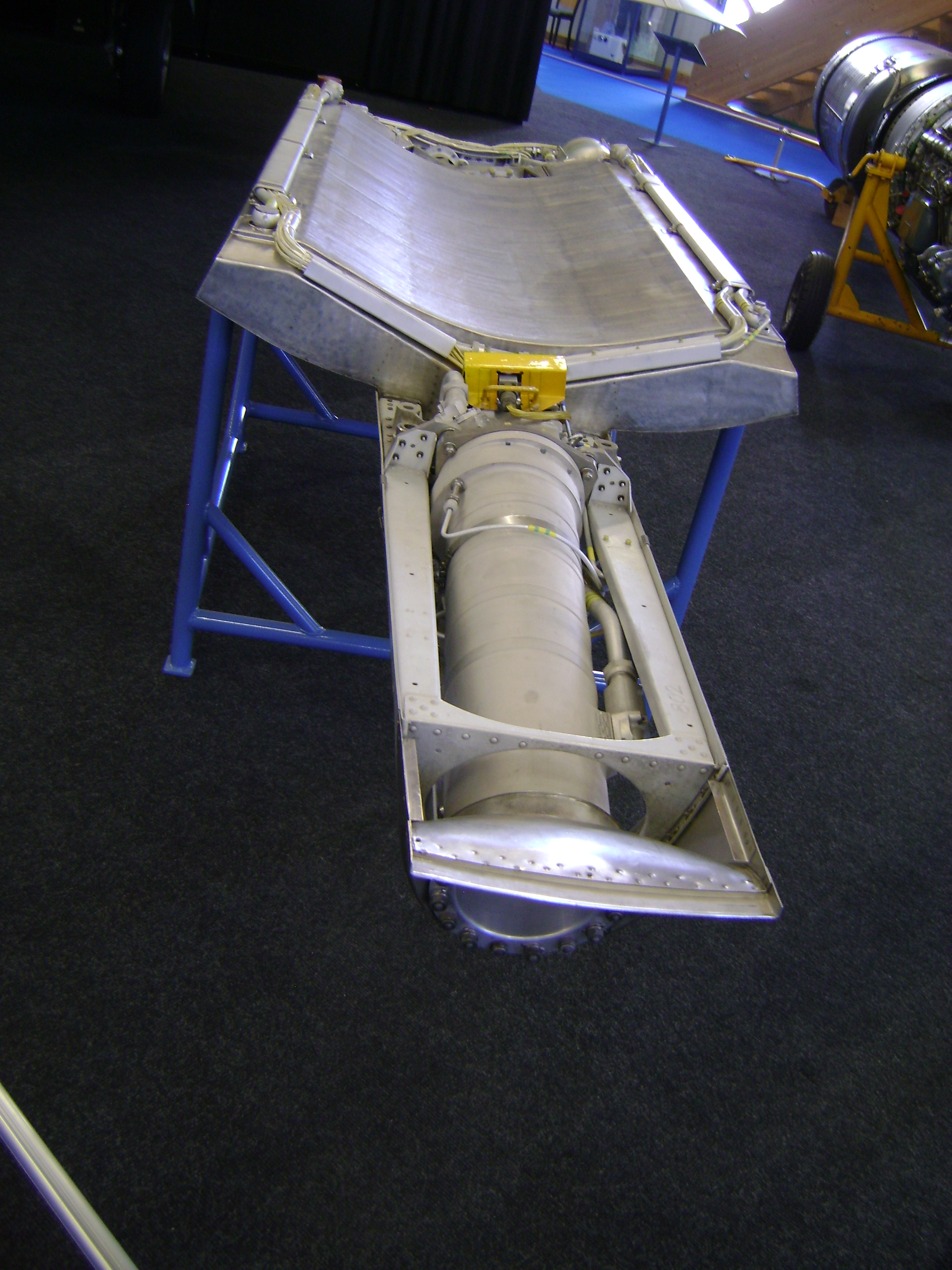

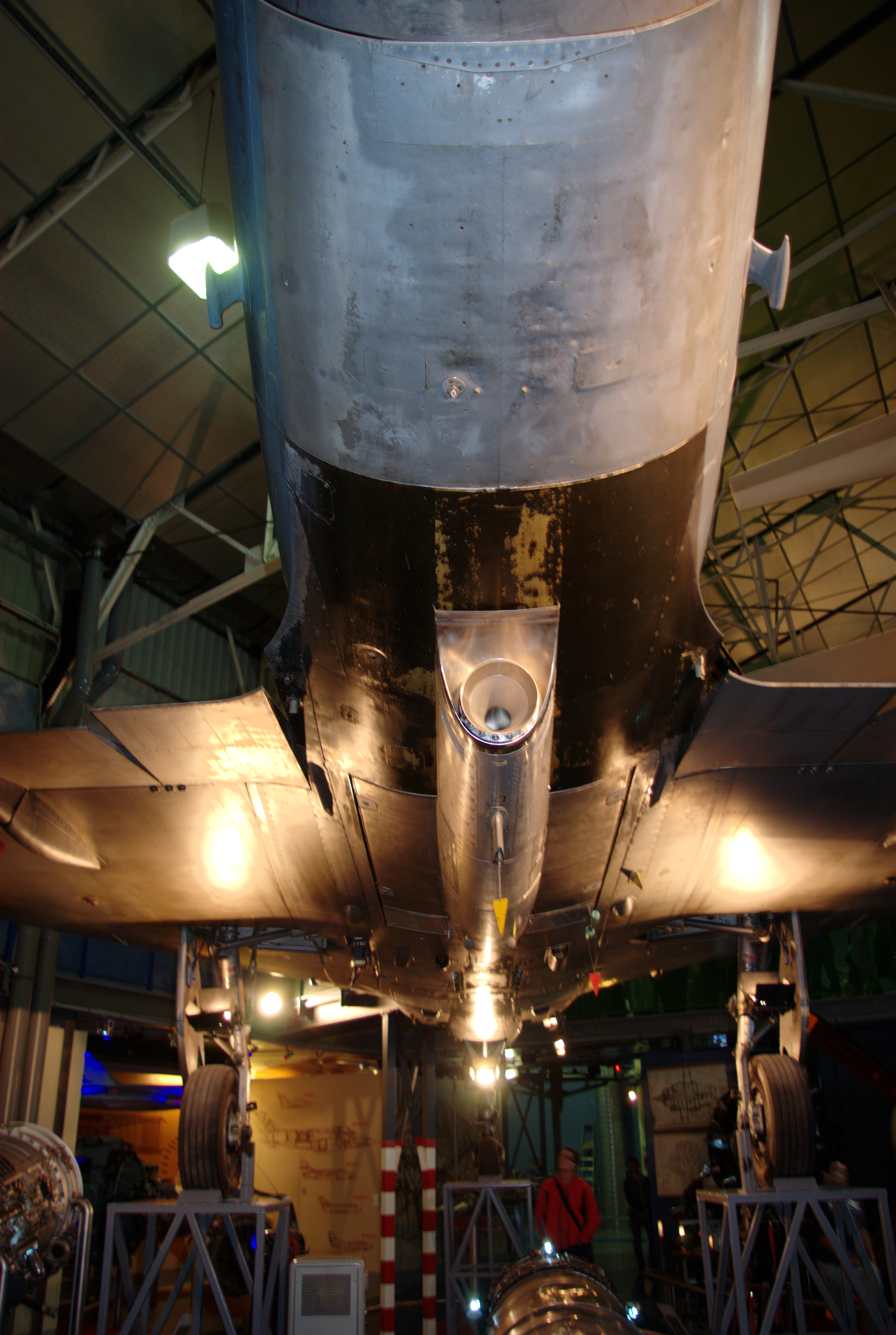
SEPR 841 monted for one Mirage IIIC.

The Mirage and its distinctive delta wing planform began with the prototype MD.550 Mystère-Delta. This bore little relation, other than its name, to the Dassault Mystère; France's swept-wing fighter of the period. The delta aircraft was smaller, around two thirds of the Mystère's weight and was powered by two compact Viper turbojets and the SEPR 66 rocket. In late 1954, the Mirage I attained a recorded speed of Mach 1.6 with the use of the rocket motor.

The Mirage III adopted the more developed and afterburning ATAR 9 turbojet. (Note: At 12,000lbf thrust, this was around twice that of the Mystère's ATAR 101D) As the delta wing considerably increased the supersonic capacity of the aircraft, rocket power was retained. In May 1958, it became the first European aircraft to exceed Mach 2 in level flight. (Note: The English Electric Lightning interceptor would not achieve Mach 2 in level flight until November 1958, six months after the Mirage III) It was recognised that most mission profiles did not require the rocket and could not afford its fuel consumption. The original goal of intercepting high-flying bombers also seemed to be receding in favour of missiles, for both offence and defence. The Mirage's rocket was thus mounted as a removable pod which could be replaced with a 90 imperial gallons (410 L) jet fuel tank for additional range. Only the high altitude interception mission would normally make use of it.

To retain balance as rocket fuel was consumed, the rocket pack was in two parts. The 310 litres (69 imp gal) nitric acid oxidiser tank was mounted directly ahead of the rocket engine. A smaller 150 litres (32 imp gal) TX2 Furaline fuel tank was mounted in the front bay just behind the cockpit, replacing the cannon pack. When in the rocket-powered interceptor role, the aircraft would only be armed with missiles. Performance in training sorties achieved Mach 1.4 without the rocket and 1.8 with. Altitudes of 65,000 feet (20,000 m) could be reached in a zoom climb, or 75,000 feet (23,000 m) on rocket thrust. A typical training sortie duration of 45 minutes would be reduced to under 30, with high Mach and rocket use.

The rocket pack could be swapped in around 20 minutes by removing six bolts. Fuelling the rocket oxidiser was potentially somewhat hazardous and so it was carried out away from other aircraft, by groundcrew in protective clothing and with a fire crew standing by in order to flush away any spillage. Acid refuelling was carried out above a steel drip tray, with the acid flow and tank vent return through closed pipework with a sightglass to observe full tanks.

=== Ludion ===
The Aérospatiale Ludion was conceived of during the early 1960s as a one-man rocket-powered 'hopper', intended to give a single person the ability to quickly traverse challenging terrain and obstructions, such as rivers, trenches, and minefields, and was designed with the operational needs of the French Army in mind. While Sud Aviation was the prime contractor, it worked closely with two other companies, Bertin and SEPR, to produce the jet pumps and rocket propulsion respectively.

The Ludion featured an unconventional powerplant, which consisted of a monofuel de-composition chamber fed with pressurised isopropyl nitrate (AVPIN) and ignited by a catalyst. The high pressure gasses produced in the de-composition chamber were fed to a pair of augmentor tubes, positioned at either side of the pilot's seat and angled slightly outwards. As the gasses entered the augmentor tubes through rocket nozzles, thrust was augmented by inducing airflow through the ducts which functioned as aero-thermo-dynamic ducts, due to the heat and kinetic energy added to the flow through the ducts, and the carefully shaped exhaust nozzles. While the Ludion never progressed beyond the experimental stage, it has been described as possessing practical "flying" qualities. The pilot would control both the thrust and deflection of the jet from the nozzles by means of a small stick in each hand.

This propulsion system, which drew upon British experiments with isopropyl nitrate for the driving of jet engines, was reportedly able to fulfil all of the established requirements. However, integration with the overall vehicle posed some challenges, particularly the need to incorporate highly effective thermal insulation to protect both the pilot and the vehicle itself from the intense heat that was produced.

=== Auxiliary rocket engines ===
SEPR's auxiliary rocket engines were based on hypergolic fuel chemistry of 98.5% nitric acid (HNO_{3}) oxidiser with furfuryl alcohol as a fuel, in the ratio of 2.4:1. Later fuels were a mixture of 41% furfuryl alcohol, 41% xylidine and 18% methyl alcohol, called furaline.

Unusually, the turbopumps for some of SEPR's engine were mechanically driven from outside. (Note: The Armstrong Siddeley Snarler and early models of the Screamer had a similar arrangement.) A mechanical drive shaft from the accessory drive of the main turbojet provided the 93 brake horsepower (69 kW) needed at 5,070 rpm, (Note: SEPR 841 in the Mirage) provided that the engine was running at full speed. As the propellants are hypergolic, the engine can be ignited repeatedly simply by engaging the clutch drive to the pump.

The engine's single combustion chamber was regeneratively cooled by the acid oxidiser.

==== SEPR 841 ====
The 841 used TX2 (triethylamine xylidine) as a fuel.

This engine was designed for simplicity and reliability, rather than sophisticated control. The pilot's only control was a simple on/off switch, with the valves and pump then controlled by an electromechanical timer. Power for actuating the main valves was then obtained by a compressed air bottle or fuel pressure.

The tanks were air pressurised, the fuel tank by engine compressor bleed air and the oxidiser tank by ram air and additionally by the stored air bottle. Ram air was taken from the supersonic inlet boundary layer bleeds. A single timer-controlled valve opened the stored air supply which then opened the pneumatic LP cocks. A second valve, after a delay, engaged the turbopump clutch. HP cocks were opened by a single hydraulic piston, driven by fuel pressure controlled through a third timed valve. Both fuel and oxidiser first flowed through a small pilot valve for ignition, before their main valves opened. Correct opening of all four valves was monitored by the timer control, to ensure a safe mixture.

A dump valve system was provided for any residual acid. Oxidiser loaded was burned in flight before landing, or dumped.

Bulk production of the engines was carried out by Hispano-Suiza.

==== SEPR 844 ====
For simplicity of fuel supply, the TX2 fuel of the SEPR 84-1 was replaced with standard jet TR-0 kerosene as the SEPR 84–4. This required a few changes to the engine.

For reliable hypergolic ignition, a small TX tank was retained to supply the engine's pilot ignition valve. This fuel supply was controlled very simply, by displacement under fuel pressure acting on a piston in the tank. TX capacity limited the engine to just two or three starts per flight.

The forward bay tank could also be used as an additional fuel tank for the main jet engine. The main tankage could not, however, supply the rocket. Replacing both rocket and cannon with the fuel tanks gave additional ferry range.

== See also ==
Aircraft

- Saunders-Roe SR.53

Engines

- Napier Scorpion
