= Aérospatiale Ludion =

Prototype VTOL aircraft

SA-610 Ludion
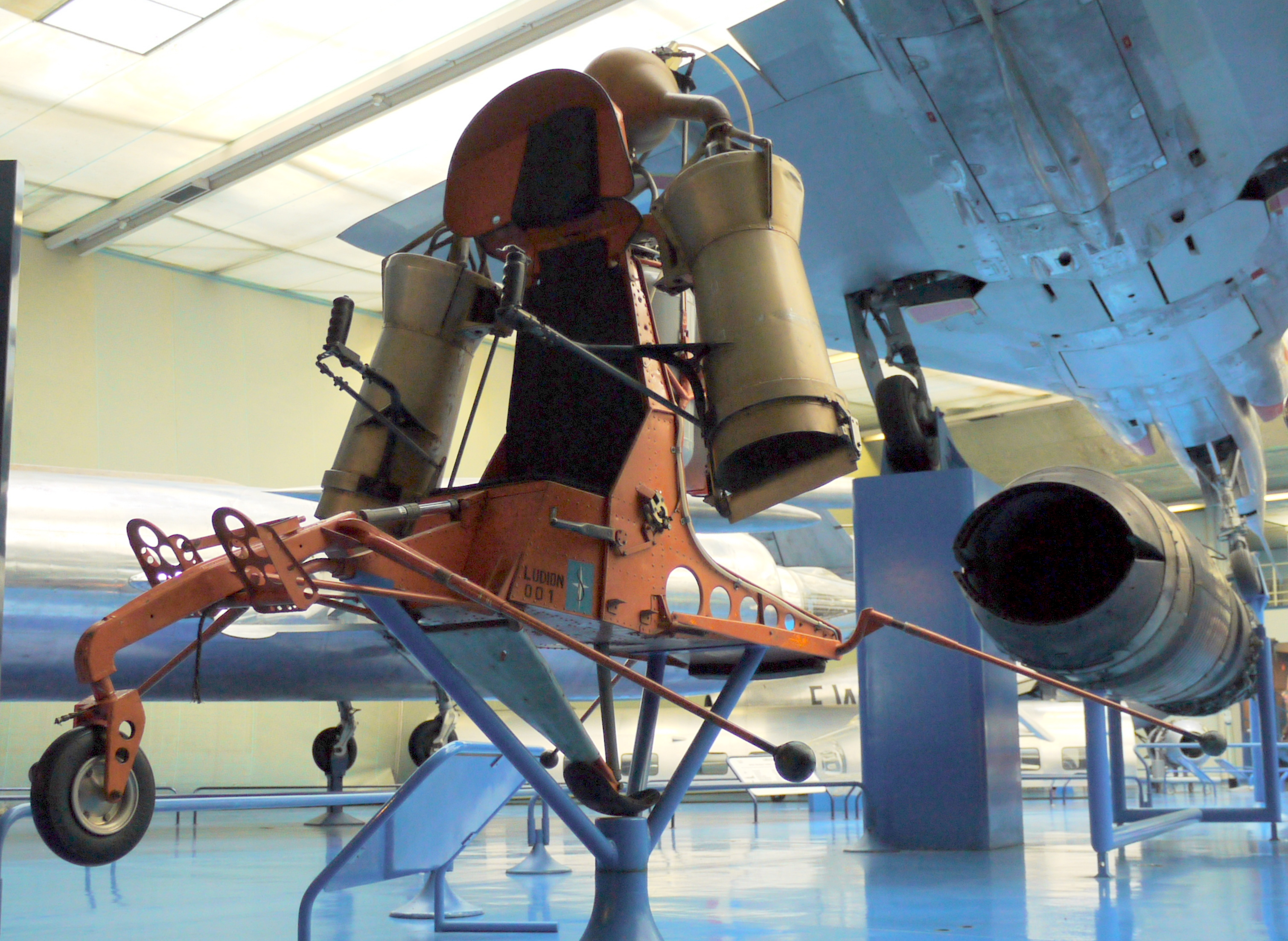
- The Ludion resting at the Musee d'L'Air, Le Bourget, Paris

General information
- Type: VTOL research aircraft
- National origin: France
- Manufacturer: Sud Aviation; Aérospatiale

History
- First flight: 1967

The Sud Aviation/Aérospatiale SA-610 Ludion (Ludion - Cadet) is a compact unorthodox VTOL aircraft designed by the French aircraft manufacturer Sud Aviation and produced by Aérospatiale.

In terms of its basic configuration, the Ludeon consisted of little more than a chair, behind which were mounted a pair of downward-pointing augmented rocket engines with flight control provided by thrust vectoring. Its novel propulsion system was developed by Bertin and Société d'Etudes pour la Propulsion par Réaction (SEPR) during the mid-1960s. Described as being a personal apparatus for overcoming obstacles, including rivers and minefields, it was intended to carry its pilot and 30 kg (66 lb) of equipment up to 700 m (2,300 ft) at an altitude of up to 200 m (600 ft).

During 1965, a development contract was awarded to Sud Aviation for the Ludion; effective integration of the various components without exposing either the pilot or elements of the vehicle itself proved to be a major challenge. The Ludion made a public appearance at the 1967 Paris Air Show. On 24 January 1968, the Ludion performed its first ground-based test; 59 tethered flights and five free flights were conduced during its flight test programme before all work was terminated due to the changing preferences of military planners and questions over its practicality. A prototype Ludion has been preserved and is on public display at the Musée de l'air et de l'espace.

== Development ==
The Ludion was conceived of during the early 1960s as a one-man rocket-powered 'hopper', intended to give a single person the ability to quickly traverse challenging terrain and obstructions, such as rivers, trenches, and minefields. The design of the Ludion was military-oriented, having been heavily shaped by the operational needs of the French Army. During 1965, the French aviation firm Sud Aviation was awarded a contract to develop the Ludion; the company worked alongside the specialist firm Bertin to produce the jet pumps and the researcher-manufacturer Société d'Etudes pour la Propulsion par Réaction (SEPR) to develop the rocket propulsion system. It was intended that, once development was completed successfully, the Ludion would be procured by the French Army.

The selected propulsion system drew upon extensive experience gathered by the British efforts on the handling and use of isopropyl nitrate to obtain large amounts of gas for the driving of jet engines. The SEPR-developed propulsion system was reportedly able to fulfil all of the established requirements. However, the principal difficulty encountered during development of the Ludion was the integration of all of its components, particularly the need to incorporate a highly effective thermal insulation arrangement. This was necessary to protect both the pilot and various elements of the vehicle itself from the intense heat that was being generated throughout its operation.

The Ludion featured an unconventional powerplant, which consisted of a monofuel de-composition chamber fed with pressurised isopropyl nitrate (AVPIN) and ignited by a catalyst. The high pressure gasses produced in the de-composition chamber were fed to a pair of augmentor tubes, positioned at either side of the pilot's seat and angled slightly outwards. As the gasses entered the augmentor tubes through rocket nozzles, thrust was augmented by inducing airflow through the ducts which functioned as aero-thermo-dynamic ducts, due to the heat and kinetic energy added to the flow through the ducts, and the carefully shaped exhaust nozzles. While the Ludion never progressed beyond the experimental stage, it has been described as possessing practical "flying" qualities. The pilot would control both the thrust and deflection of the jet from the nozzles by means of a small stick in each hand.

On 24 January 1968, the Ludion performed its first ground-based test of its rocket propulsion system at the test airfield of Villaroche. The subsequent test programme would conduct no less than 64 flights, 59 of which were tethered while five flights were entirely unrestrained. However, the programme was abandoned thereafter, as the Ludion had been deemed to be too impractical due to its size and the noise that it generated. Perhaps more crucially, military planners have shifted their preferences in favour of helicopters and amphibious transports instead, leaving the Ludion without the support of any domestic military operator.

== Specifications (SA-610 Ludion) ==
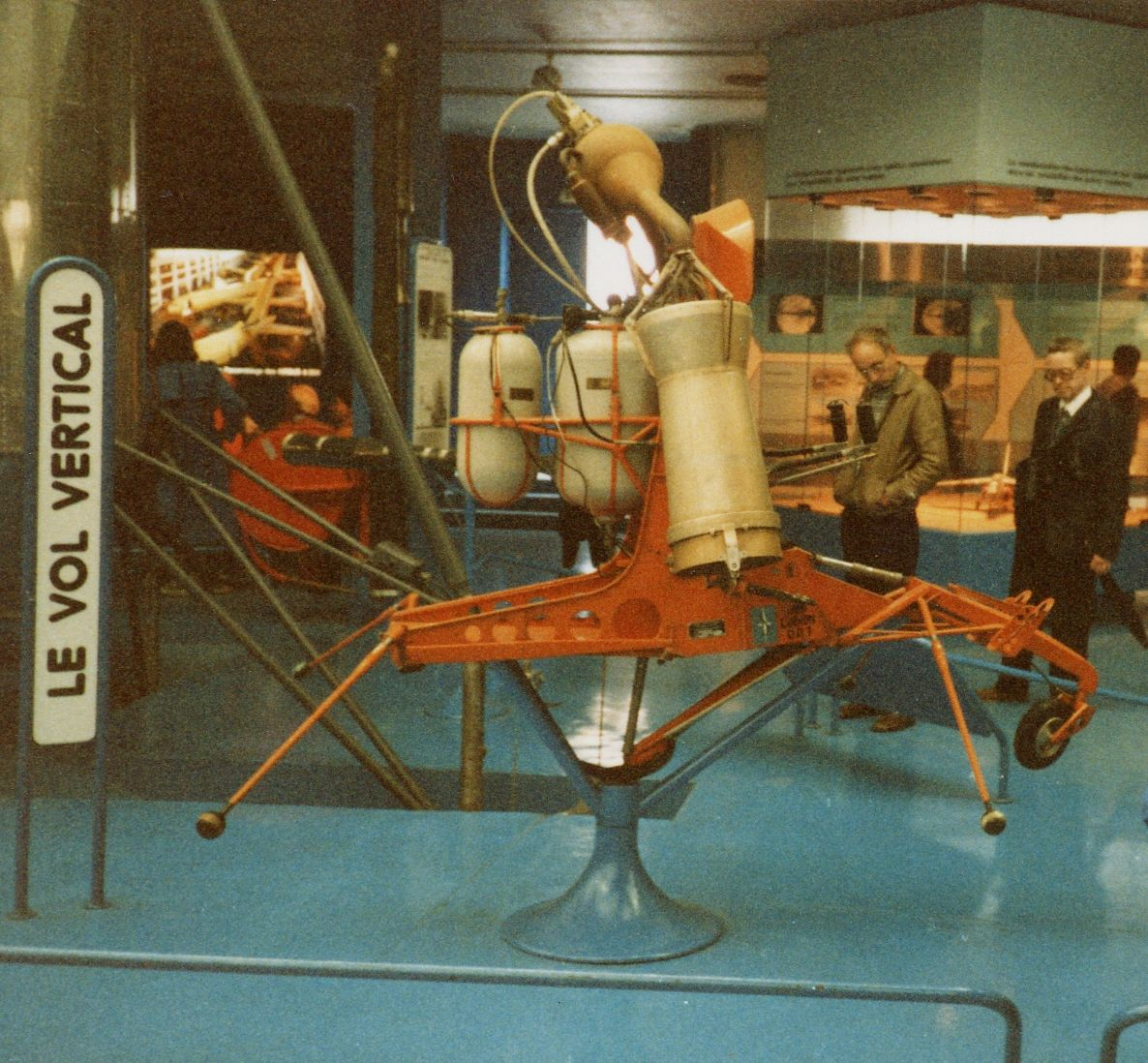
Preserved Ludion on static display at the Musée de l'air et de l'espace, 1987

Data from

General characteristics

- Crew: 1
- Capacity: payload 30 kg (66 lb)
- Length: 1.95 m (6 ft 5 in)
- Width: 1.485 m (4 ft 10 in)
- Height: 1.6 m (5 ft 3 in)
- Empty weight: 90 kg (198 lb)
- Gross weight: 170 kg (375 lb) approximate
- Powerplant: 1 × SEPR S178 isopropyl nitrate (AVPIN) decomposition gas generator with augmentor tubes

Performance

- Service ceiling: 700 m (2,300 ft)

== See also ==
Aircraft of comparable role, configuration, and era

- Lunar Landing Research Vehicle – Apollo human lunar landing training vehicle
- Rolls-Royce Thrust Measuring Rig – 1950s British experimental VTOL aircraft
- VFW SG 1262 Schwebegestell – 1960s German experimental aircraft
