= Sud-Ouest Espadon =

French post-war prototype interceptor

SO.6020 Espadon
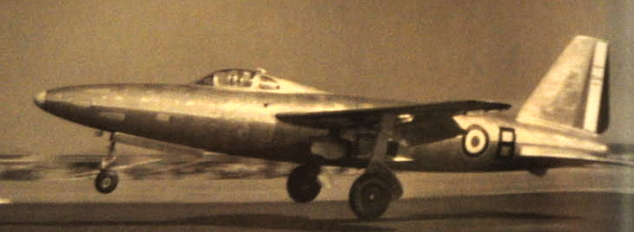
- The SO.6021 before it was modified as an engine testbed in 1951

General information
- Type: Prototype interceptor
- National origin: France
- Manufacturer: SNCASO
- Number built: 4

History
- First flight: 12 November 1948

The Sud-Ouest SO.6020 Espadon (Swordfish) was a French post-war prototype interceptor designed and built by SNCASO during the late 1940s. The French Air Force (Armée de l'Air) judged the design a failure despite some records being set and cancelled plans to put it into service in 1951. Only four aircraft were built and they were later modified to serve as testbeds for the mixed rocket and turbojet-powered SNCASO SO.9000 Trident program. Only one badly damaged aircraft survives.

== Background and description ==
Designer Lucien Servanty and his team at SNCASO began work on jet-powered fighters in 1945 and submitted a design proposal that the company designated as the SO.6020 when the French Air Force issued a specification for a single-seat assault fighter-interceptor on 25 March 1946. The aircraft had to have a speed in excess of 900 kilometers per hour (559 mph) at an altitude of 10,000 meters (32,808 ft), an endurance of one hour with 15 minutes in combat, a take-off distance less than 1,200 meters (3,937 ft), a cockpit armored against 12.7-millimeter (0.5 in) shells, and an armament of six 20-millimeter (0.8 in) or four 30-millimeter (1.2 in) autocannon. The Air Force ordered three prototypes on 28 June, with plans to order more than 230 interceptors if the aircraft satisfied its requirements.

As built, the aircraft was a metal-skinned mid-wing monoplane powered by a 22.2-kilonewton (5,000 lb_{f}) Rolls-Royce Nene turbojet engine licence-built by Hispano-Suiza. It had a one-spar swept wing fitted with leading-edge slats, slotted flaps and ailerons. The wide-track tricycle landing gear retracted into the fuselage while the main landing gear struts retracted into the bottom of the wing. The canopy of the cockpit was unusually tall because the Air Force decided to provide the pilot with a parachute despite the Heinkel ejection seat. The SO.6020 had a total fuel capacity of 2,150 litres (470 imp gal; 570 US gal) divided amongst four fuel tanks.

== Development ==
The unarmed first prototype made its maiden flight on 12 November 1948, delayed by the late delivery of its radio equipment. This aircraft had a ventral air intake for the engine that proved to be very inefficient and tended to collect objects from the runway. This caused the prototype to be very underpowered and it failed to meet nearly all of the specifications. It had an engine failure in flight on 1 December 1949 that caused a belly landing, but it was repaired and returned to flight testing. It was later modified for flying trials with small wingtip-mounted turbojets.

The second prototype was scheduled to make its first flight on 15 August 1948, but this was delayed until 16 September 1949, possibly due to the need to revise the air intake to improve the flow to the engine. SNCASO decided upon a pair of protruding intakes on the sides of the fuselage under the trailing edge of the wing roots. The aircraft was fitted with six cannon in the nose. Flight testing showed that there was little improvement in the supply of air to the engine and that it was not very maneuverable as a lot of force was required to move the rudder. The aircraft's longitudinal and transverse stability was poor and it was not effective as a gunnery platform above speeds of 600 kilometres per hour (373 mph) as the controls required more effort to move at high speeds. Landing characteristics were rated as good although it had marginally effective speed brakes.

The third prototype was intended to serve as an unarmed reconnaissance aircraft, but it was converted while under construction into the SO.6025 to support the mixed-power SNCASO SO.9000 program. It reverted to the ventral air intake of the first prototype, albeit in an extended and revised form. The rear section of the intake fairing was extended to house a 14.7-kilonewton (3,300 lbf) SEPR 25 liquid-fuel rocket engine. The aircraft also received the enlarged wing used by the SO.6021 pre-production fighter and an enlarged vertical stabilizer. Some of the internal fuel tanks were converted for the Furaline (C_{13}H_{12}N_{2}O) rocket fuel and the nitric acid oxidizer was carried in a tank between the intake and the rocket where it could be safely dumped if necessary. The aircraft first flew on 28 December 1949, solely using its turbojet, and made its first rocket-powered flight on 10 June 1952. It became the first European aircraft to break the sound barrier in level flight on 15 December 1953.

The proposed production variant, the SO.6021, was lightened in the hopes of improving its performance by reducing the amount of armor plate carried and shrinking the canopy. It was fitted with an enlarged wing and a new vertical stabilizer and weighed about 400 kilograms (880 lb) less than the first SO.6020 prototype. The aircraft made its maiden flight on 3 September 1950. It could reach Mach 0.96 in a dive, but encountered serious buffeting at Mach 0.75 in horizontal flight and handled as poorly as its predecessors. Unhappy with its performance, the French Air Force cancelled its plans to put the SO.6021 into production on 5 July 1951. By this time, the Air Force had already decided to use the aircraft to support the SO.9000 program by testing various small turbojet engines on wingtip mounts. These included the 4 kN (900 lbf) Turbomeca Marboré and the more powerful Turbomeca Gabizo engine, in both afterburning and non-afterburning configurations. At one point it was flying with one of each type despite their differing weights and sizes. These tests lasted until 1956.

The second prototype was subsequently converted into the SO.6026 with a SEPR 25 rocket below the tail pipe, also to support the SO.9000 program. It first flew with the rocket installed on 15 October 1951, but the first rocket-powered flight did not occur until 26 March 1953. It demonstrated its rocket's ability to climb at the 1953 Paris Air Show, but only made a total of 28 flights before it was placed in storage in early 1955, of which only 13 used its rocket.

== Variants ==
SO.6020-01
Nene-powered prototype, later fitted with two small wingtip-mounted turbojets.
SO.6020-02
Second prototype, later modified with the addition of a SEPR 25 rocket engine and re-designated SO.6026.
SO.6020-03
Third prototype, modified while under construction as the SO.6025 also with a SEPR 25 rocket.
SO.6021
The proposed production aircraft with a variety of structural changes to reduce weight and improve performance. Unsuccessful and it too was later used to test wingtip turbojets.
SO.6025
The third prototype fitted with a SEPR 25 beneath the fuselage.
SO.6026
The second prototype was also modified with a SEPR 25 in a neater installation in the tail.

== Surviving aircraft ==
- The sole SO.6025 is at the Ailes Anciennes Toulouse Museum in poor condition.

== Specifications (SO.6021) ==
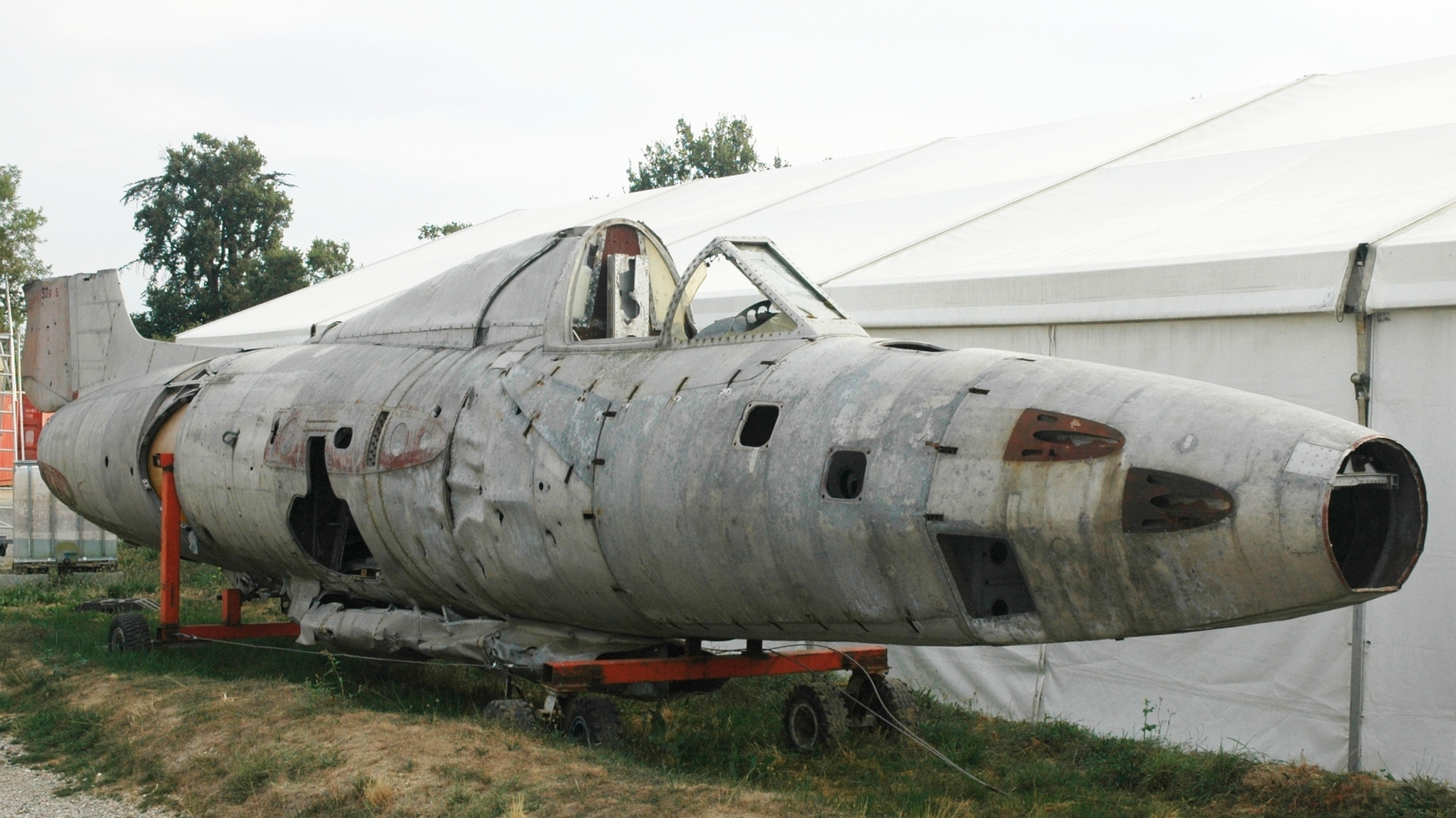
The badly damaged third prototype in outdoor storage

Data from The Complete Book of Fighters; X-Planes of Europe II: Military Prototype Aircraft from the Golden Age 1946–1974

General characteristics

- Crew: 1
- Length: 15 m (49 ft 3 in)
- Wingspan: 10.6 m (34 ft 9 in)
- Height: 4.72 m (15 ft 6 in)
- Wing area: 26.5 m^{2} (285 sq ft)
- Empty weight: 4,750 kg (10,472 lb)
- Gross weight: 6,870 kg (15,146 lb)
- Powerplant: 1 × Rolls-Royce Nene centrifugal turbojet engine, 22.2 kN (5,000 lbf) thrust

Performance

- Maximum speed: 860 km/h (530 mph, 460 kn) at sea level
- Maximum speed: Mach 0.96
- Endurance: 2.5 hours
- Service ceiling: 13,000 m (43,000 ft)
- Rate of climb: 27 m/s (5,300 ft/min)
- Time to altitude: 8 minutes, 20 seconds to 10,000 m (33,000 ft)

Armament

- Guns: 6 × 20 mm (0.8 in) autocannon
