= Tethered flight test =

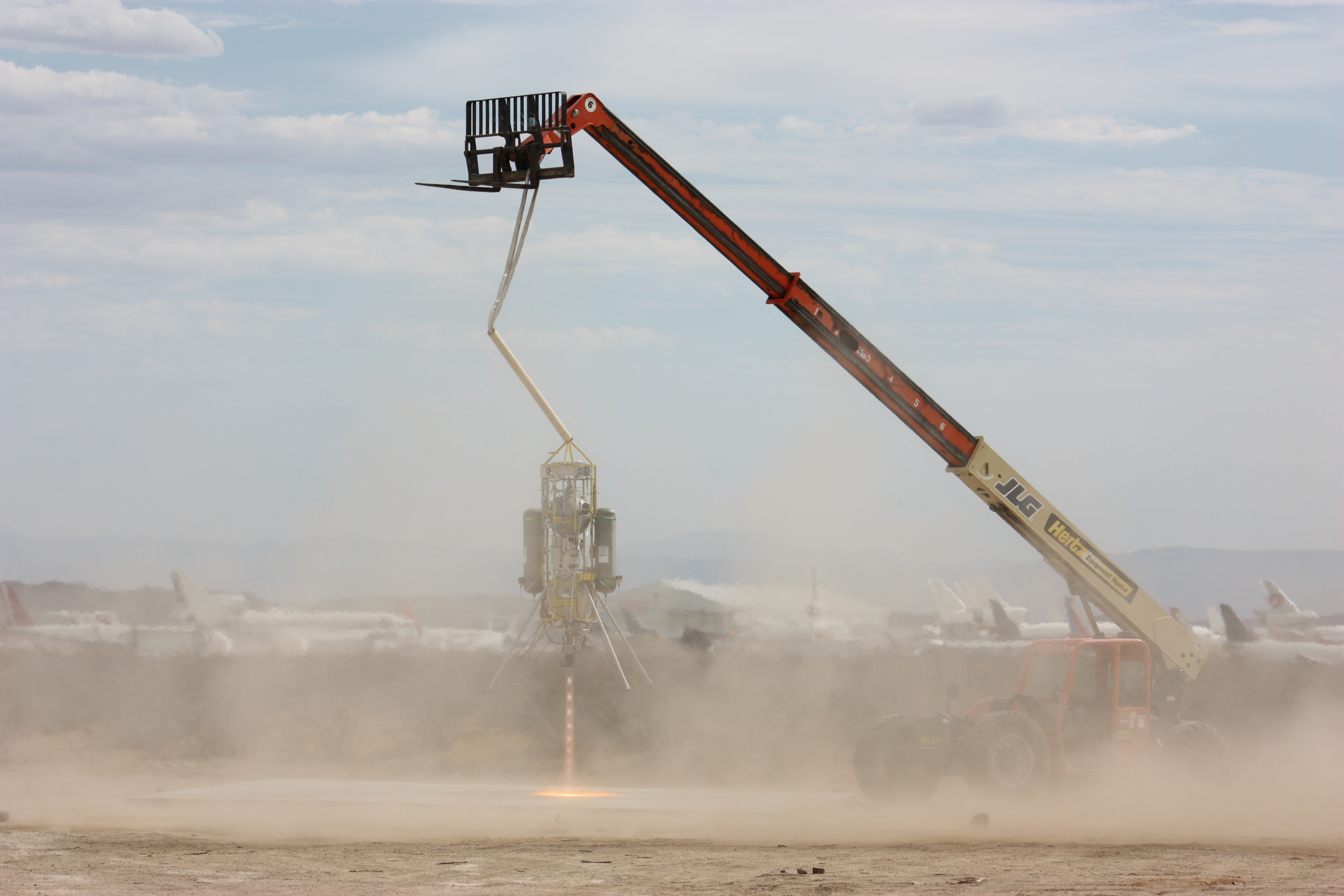
Tethered rocket test

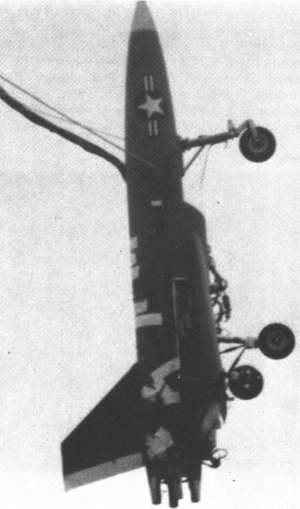
Tethered VTOL test

A tethered flight test is a type of flight testing where a machine is connected by a tether to the ground. Tethered testing may be used when motion through the atmosphere is not required to sustain flight, such as for airship; vertical take-off and landing (VTOL), rotary wing or tiltwing aircraft (tethered hovering); or for tests of certain rockets, such as vertical takeoff, vertical landing (VTVL). Fixed wing scale models can be tested on a tether in a wind tunnel, simulating motion through the atmosphere.

== History ==
Numerous vertical take-off and landing (VTOL) aircraft conducted their initial flights while tethered. Early vertical flights of the Short SC.1, an early experimental aircraft that was the first British fixed-wing VTOL aircraft as well as the first one to transition between vertical and horizontal flight modes. For these flights, a custom-built gantry was developed that accommodated only a limited amount of freedom, up to 15 ft vertically and 10 ft off-centre in any direction, vertical velocity was also restricted to less than 10 ft/second; progressive arresting of the aircraft occurred beyond these limitation. It would take off from a grid platform positioned 6 ft above the ground itself in order to circumvent the ground effect phenomenon; considerable effort on the part of Shorts had been made during development of a suitable platform to eliminate the negative impact of ground effect and was redesigned several times. The gantry facility was used for ab initio training and familiarisation purposes for the first 8 pilots to fly the SC.1.

Insight from the SC.1 heavily influenced the Hawker Siddeley P.1127, the forerunner to the Hawker Siddeley Harrier VTOL fighter. Its initial flights were also performed while tethered; such flights were largely conducted so that test pilots could familiarise themselves with the aircraft's controls in hover in a less risky environment. As confidence in the aircraft's handling grew, tethered flights without the aid of its onboard auto-stabiliser system were conducted. Finally, on 19 November 1960, the first un-tethered free-flight hover of a P.1127 took place; flight testing of the type proceeded over the rest of the decade ahead of the first production aircraft being introduced to service in 1969.

Numerous VTOL aircraft that would eventually be cancelled mid-development underwent tethered test flights. A pair of prototype EWR VJ 101 fighters were produced, the first performing its first hovering flight on 10 April 1963. Prior to this, the VJ 1010's propulsion concept had been evaluated on a specially-produced test rig, often informally referred to as the Wippe (seesaw), during the early 1960s; it incorporated a rudimentary cockpit fixed upon a horizontal beam, which had a "lift" engine mounted vertically at the centre, for the purpose of performing preliminary single-axis tests of the control system. A second "hover rig" was later assembled, possessing the skeletal fuselage of the VJ 101C along with a total of three Rolls-Royce RB108 engines installed in the approximate positions that they would occupy in the final flight-capable version and capable of lifting the test rig. Starting in May 1961, initial testing was conducted from a telescopic column, in March 1962, the new rig conducted its first "free flight" successfully.

The experimental Dassault Balzac V, a forerunner to the larger Dassault Mirage IIIV, was another experimental VTOL aircraft. The Balzac commenced tethered hover flights on 12 October 1962, and achieved the first free-hover only six days later; flight testing of the type ended in September 1965 following an accident. The Yakovlev Yak-36, an experimental VTOL aircraft developed in the Soviet Union as a forerunner to the Yakovlev Yak-38 production carrier aircraft, was also subject to a number of tethered flights in advance of freely hovering. During early development work for the Ryan X-13 Vertijet, test rigs were repeatedly flown via remote control while tethered.

== See also ==
- Index of aviation articles
