= Turbomeca Gabizo =

Small turbojet engine developed in France in the 1950s

Gabizo
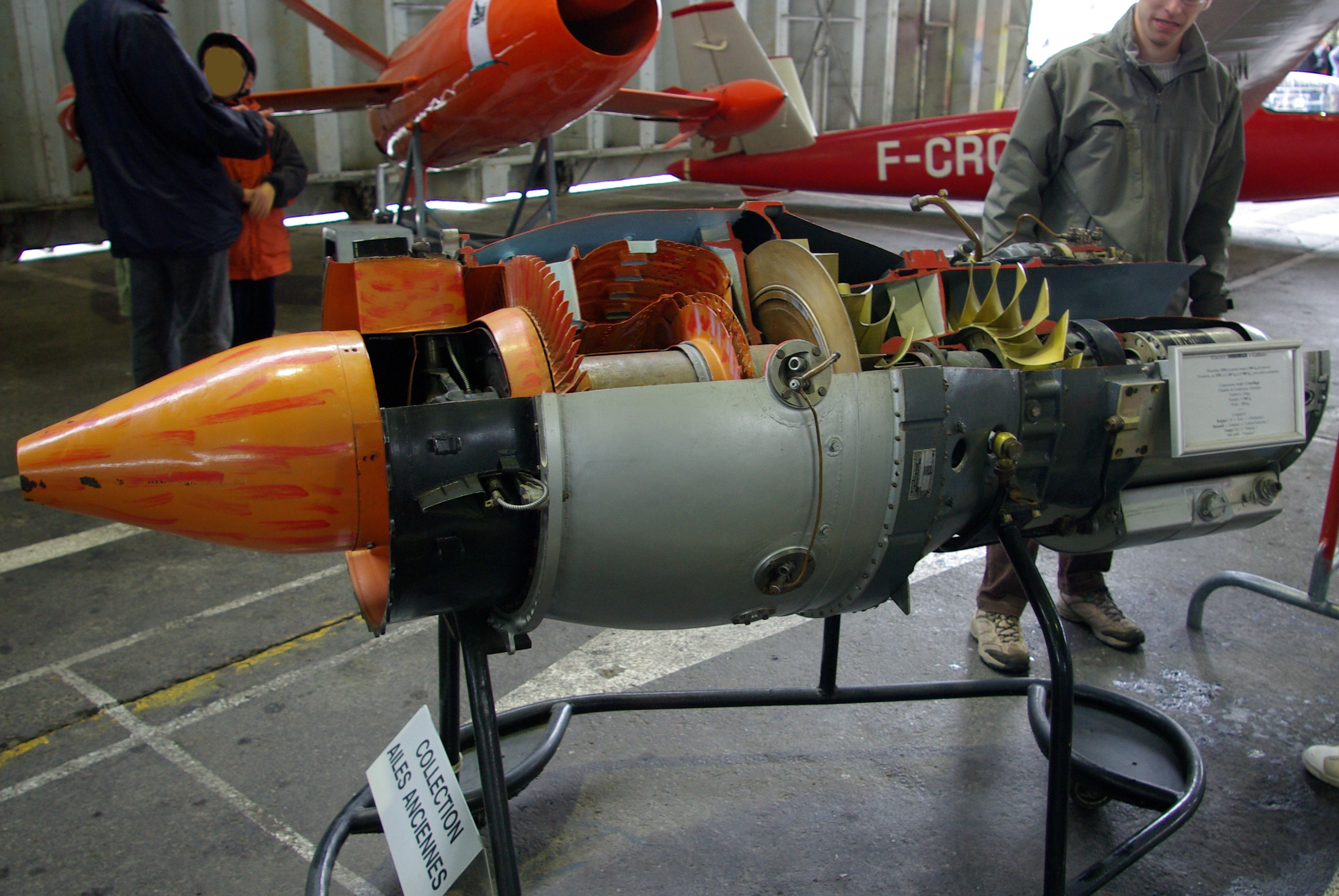
- Turbomeca Gabizo on display
- Type: Turbojet
- National origin: France
- Manufacturer: Turbomeca
- First run: 1954

The Turbomeca Gabizo is a small turbojet engine produced by Turbomeca from the 1950s. The components were designed to take the stresses of high-speed fighter aircraft with some variants featuring afterburner.

== Applications ==
- Breguet 1100
- Dassault Étendard II
- Fouga CM.171 Makalu
- SNCASO Trident

== Specifications (Gabizo) ==
Data from Flight, Aircraft engines of the World 1957

==== General characteristics ====
- Type: Turbojet
- Length: 2,083 mm (82.01 in)
- Diameter: 670 mm (26.38 in)
- Dry weight: 265 kg (584 lb)

==== Components ====
- Compressor: Single stage axial plus single-stage centrifugal
- Combustors: Single annular combustion chamber
- Turbine: Single-stage axial
- Fuel type: Aviation kerosene / JP-1
- Oil system: Pressure spray with scavenge at 3.0 bar (43 psi)

==== Performance ====
- Maximum thrust:

- Take-off: 10.79 kN (2,426 lbf) at 18,000 rpm
- Maximum continuous: 8.6 kN (1,940 lbf)

- Overall pressure ratio: 5.2:1
- Air mass flow: 22 kg/s (49 lb/s) at 18,000 rpm
- Turbine inlet temperature:

- TIT: 1,113.15 K (1,544.00 °F; 840.00 °C)
- JPT: 923.15 K (1,202.00 °F; 650.00 °C)

- Specific fuel consumption: 1.00 lb/lbf/h (0.028 kg/N/ks)
- Thrust-to-weight ratio: 4.15

== See also ==
Comparable engines

- Armstrong Siddeley Viper

Related lists

- List of aircraft engines
