= SNCASO SO.9000 Trident =

French mixed-power interceptor aircraft

SO.9000/SO.9050 Trident
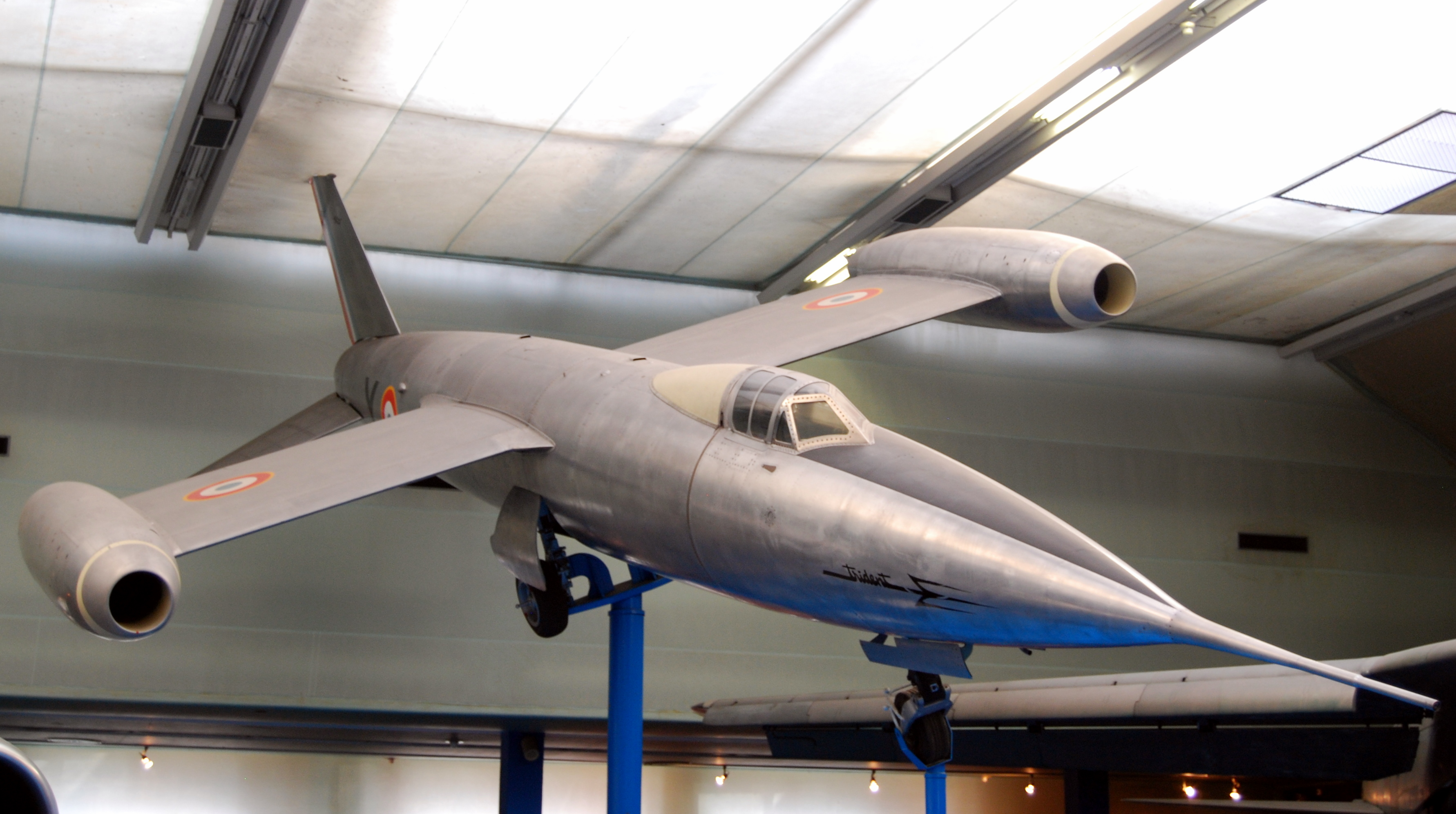
- The first prototype of the SO.9000 Trident I on display in the Musée de l'Air et de l'Espace, Paris

General information
- Type: Research interceptor aircraft
- National origin: France
- Manufacturer: SNCASO
- Number built: 8

History
- First flight: 2 March 1953 (SNCASO SO-9000 Trident I)

The SNCASO SO.9000 Trident is a French jet and rocket powered interceptor aircraft built by aircraft manufacturer SNCASO during the 1950s. As part of a wider effort to re-build French military power during the late 1940s and to furnish France with advanced, new domestically produced designs, a request for a supersonic-capable point-defence interceptor aircraft to equip the French Air Force was issued to SNCASO. In response, the firm designed the mixed-propulsion Trident, powered by a single SEPR rocket engine, which was augmented by wingtip-mounted turbojet engines, and the Air Force ordered two prototypes.

The two SO.9000 Trident Is demonstrated the feasibility of the design concept despite the loss of one aircraft during flight testing and the Air Force ordered a batch of three prototype SO.9050 Trident II fighters in 1954, and a batch of six pre-production aircraft in 1956 to further develop the aircraft so it could serve as a short-range interceptor. Only six of these nine aircraft were ultimately completed, of which all three prototypes were damaged or destroyed in accidents before the programme was cancelled in 1958 despite their record-setting performance.

== Background and description ==
During the late 1940s, following the end of the Second World War, France quickly set about its recovery and the rebuilding of its military, particularly the French Air Force with the indigenous development of advanced military aircraft. In this respect, one area of high interest was the relatively new field of rocket-powered aircraft. According to aviation historian Michel van Pelt, French Air Force officials were against a pure rocket-powered fighter, akin to the wartime-era Messerschmitt Me 163 Komet, but instead favoured a mixed-propulsion approach, using a combination of rocket and turbojet engines. During 1944, a new company, Société d'Etudes pour la Propulsion par Réaction (SEPR), had been founded for the purpose of developing France's own domestic rocket engines.

Accordingly, SNCASO received a request from the Air Staff to begin studies for rocket-powered point-defence interceptors with auxiliary turbojets in 1948. During October, SNCASO commenced work upon a series of design studies in response. One particular design by aircraft designer Lucien Servanty was favoured by the company. This was a shoulder-wing monoplane capable of supersonic speeds using a single SEPR-built rocket engine in the fuselage augmented with a set of wingtip-mounted turbojets; operationally, both types of engines were to be used to perform a rapid climb and interception at high altitudes, while the jet engines alone would be used to return to base. Servanty persuaded the Air Force to fund a design study and a mockup on 7 July 1950.

The rocket engine selected was based that used by the Matra M.04 missile. It was powered by a mixture of Furaline (C_{13}H_{12}N_{2}O) and nitric acid (HNO_{3}); according to Pelt, the decision to use nitric acid as the oxidizing agent posed some challenges as it was corrosive to both the airframe and engine. The combination of Furaline, which was relatively difficult to manufacture in comparison to conventional kerosene, and nitric acid functioned as a hypergolic propellant, not requiring any igniting agent. However, as crewed rocket aircraft were an entirely unknown commodity within France, the Air Force decided to modify an existing aircraft, the Sud-Ouest Espadon, to serve as an aerial test bed to prove the propulsion arrangement. During March 1951, the first ground tests of the rocket engine were performed; on 10 June 1952, the modified Espadon test bed performed its maiden flight. During its test programme, improved rocket engines were trialed and the aircraft became the first European aircraft to attain Mach 1 during level flight.

Encouraged by the success of the Espadon, the Air Force issued a request to French aircraft companies for a high-speed, lightweight interceptor aircraft that harnessed either turbojet or rocket propulsion, or some combination thereof. Amongst the specified requirements given were the ability to attain Mach 1.3, a relatively high climb rate, and the possibility of deploying the aircraft from austere airstrips. Amongst the various responses from French industry was SNCASO with their own proposal, which was based upon their earlier design studies; their design was later designated as the SO.9000 Trident.

The Trident was a fast-looking bullet-shaped aircraft, furnished with an aerodynamically clean fuselage and thin, straight wings in order to minimise drag. It was equipped with a narrow-track tricycle landing gear with the main wheels retracting into the fuselage. The design was unusual for more than just its mixed-propulsion arrangement. Instead of a conventional ejection seat, the entire nose section could be jettisoned. Particular attention had been dedicated to the control system to ensure it would be suitable throughout the transonic and supersonic stages of flight; while conventional ailerons were used when flown at slow speeds, these would be locked out of use at higher speeds to prevent the formation of shock waves; instead, the tailplane controlled roll by moving in opposite directions. All three tail surfaces were all-moving, eliminating the requirement for separate elevators and rudders while preventing control lock-ups during high speeds. Suitably impressed with the design and its projected performance, SNCASO received a contract for two prototypes on 8 April 1951.

=== SO.9000 Trident I ===
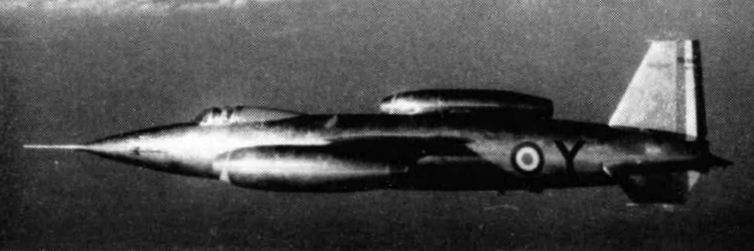
The Trident I in flight, c. 1956

On 2 March 1953, the first prototype Trident I conducted the type's maiden flight; flown by test pilot Jacques Guignard, the aircraft used the entire length of the runway to get airborne, being powered only by its two 4 kN (900 lbf) Turbomeca Marboré turbojet engines. It was initially flown without any rocket engine installed, relying solely upon its turbojet engines instead to evaluate its low-speed handling. According to aviation historian Bill Gunston, the early test flights of the SO.9000 were "hairy" prior to the installation of the rocket motor in September 1954. During the first flight of the second Trident I prototype on 1 September 1953, the aircraft crashed after struggling to gain altitude after takeoff and collided with a utility pole, resulting in the separation of the nose section and Guignard sustaining severe injuries.

On 16 January 1954, test flights using the remaining Trident I prototype were resumed, flown by test pilot Charles Goujon. On what would have been its sixth rocket-powered flight on 26 October, the rocket failed during takeoff and the aircraft was barely able to return to the runway and land safely. This incident graphically demonstrated that the Trident needed more power from its turbojets and the aircraft was grounded until more powerful 7.34 kN (1,654 lbf) Dassault MD.30 Viper engines, a license-produced version of the British Armstrong Siddeley Viper, were installed. The aircraft made its first flight with its new engines in March 1955. Powered by these engines, the aircraft soon proved its ability to exceed Mach 1 during a shallow dive even without the added thrust of the rocket motor.

In April 1956, it was decided to end flight testing with the surviving Trident I. During the 18-month-long flight test programme, the Trident I had completed over 100 flights, having eventually reached a maximum recorded speed of Mach 1.8 and a peak altitude of 20,000 metres (65,000 ft). A total of 24 of these flights had been flown using the rocket engine. According to Pelt, the French Air Force were impressed by the performance of the Trident, and were keen to adopt an improved operationally-capable model into service.

=== SO.9050 Trident II ===
Two prototype SO.9050 Trident IIs were ordered in 1954 and primarily differed from their predecessors by the use of a more powerful rocket as a two-chamber 29.3 kN (6,600 lbf) SEPR 631 rocket replaced the SEPR 431. Other changes included the deletion of the ailerons, a smaller wing, an enlarged cockpit, the transfer of the speed brakes from the wings to the fuselage and the lengthening of the landing gear to accommodate a large air-to-air missile (AAM) beneath the fuselage. The first aircraft made its maiden flight on 19 July 1955, albeit only with its turbojets, and its first rocket-powered flight occurred on 21 December. The second prototype first flew on 4 January 1956, but was destroyed three days later when the fuel pump to the turbojets failed and the engines flamed out. A third prototype had been built by SNCASO to develop a surface-to-air missile based on the Trident, but it was purchased by the Air Force to replace the destroyed aircraft and first flew on 30 March.

On 16 February 1956, the first prototype reached a speed of Mach 1.7 while carrying a mockup of the Matra 052 AAM. It subsequently attained a speed of Mach 1.96 without the missile at a height of 19,100 m (62,664 ft). On 21 May 1957, the aircraft exploded in mid-air during a practice flight for the Paris Air Show that was probably caused when the highly volatile Furaline and nitric acid accidentally mixed and exploded, killing the pilot. The third prototype continued flying until it made a belly landing on 19 September.

In May 1956, the French Air Force placed an order for a batch of six pre-production aircraft, and a supplementary contract followed for four additional aircraft, although this later contract was cancelled on 24 October 1957 due to budget cutbacks. These aircraft differed from the first three prototypes by substituting a pair of 10.79 kN (2,430 lbf) Turbomeca Gabizo turbojets for the MD.30 engines. Other changes included a redesigned nose to accommodate a fire-control radar and the addition of a hardpoint below the fuselage for a Matra R.511 AAM. The first pre-production aircraft (the fourth Trident II) was first flown on 3 May 1957.

In an unsuccessful attempt to stave off cancellation, SNACSO made efforts to establish new time-to-height and altitude records in 1958. The first pre-production aircraft set a record of 2 minutes, 37 seconds to 15,000 metres (49,213 ft) on 4 April while the third pre-production aircraft unofficially reached 22,800 metres (74,800 ft) on 17 January and then made its officially-observed record-breaking altitude of 24,217 metres (79,452 ft) on 2 May, shortly after the programme was cancelled on 26 April. The last three incomplete airframes were scrapped, but the Air Force continued the flight testing until late in the year. This allowed the Trident II to establish various unofficial records before the surviving aircraft were scrapped. These included a maximum speed of Mach 1.97 on 23 July, an altitude of 26,000 metres (85,302 ft) on 6 October that was the highest altitude to be flown by a turbojet and a time-to-height of 2 minutes, 15 seconds to 15,000 metres on 8 July. None of these later accomplishments were publicised to avoid upsetting the Air Force after it had decided upon the Dassault Mirage III to satisfy its interceptor requirement.

== Variants ==
SO.9000 Trident I

Two aircraft built, powered by two Turbomeca Marboré II turbojet engines with a single three-chamber SEPR 481 rocket engine.

SO.9050 Trident II

Three prototypes and six pre-production aircraft, but only three of the latter were completed. The prototypes were powered by a pair of Dassault MD.30 Viper turbojets and a two-chamber SEPR 631 rocket engine. The pre-production aircraft were equipped with two Turbomeca Gabizo turbojets and a SEPR 631.

SO.9050 Trident III

The fourth incomplete pre-production aircraft would have served as a prototype for the Trident III family, all of which would have been fitted with two afterburning Turbomeca Gabizo turbojets and a SEPR 631. The IIIB would have had a lengthened fuselage and a revised canopy. The nose of the IIIC would have been enlarged to accommodate a larger fire-control radar.

== Surviving aircraft ==
The first prototype of the SO.9000 has been on public display since 1956 at the Musée de l'Air et de l'Espace, near Paris.

== Specifications (SO.9050 Trident II (pre-production models)) ==
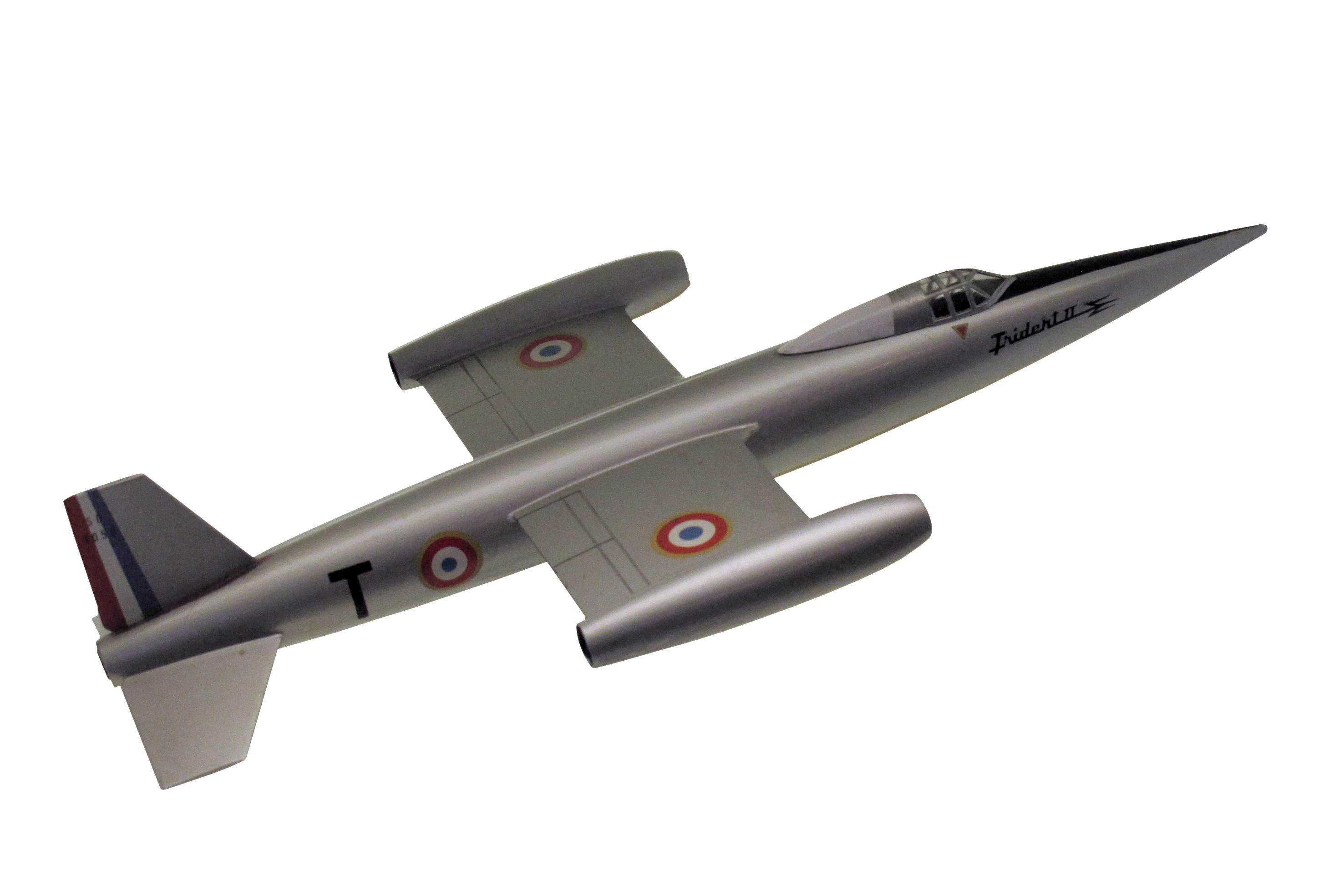

Data from X-Planes of Europe: Secret Research Aircraft from the Golden Age 1946-1974; French Secret Projects 1: Post War Fighters

General characteristics

- Crew: 1
- Length: 12.7 m (41 ft 8 in)
- Wingspan: 6.98 m (22 ft 11 in)
- Wing area: 14.5 m^{2} (156 sq ft)
- Gross weight: 5,150 kg (11,354 lb)
- Max takeoff weight: 5,900 kg (13,007 lb)
- Powerplant: 2 × Turbomeca Gabizo turbojet engines, 10.79 kN (2,425 lbf) thrust each
- Powerplant: 1 × SEPR 631 liquid-fuelled dual-chamber rocket engine, 29.42 kN (6,615 lbf) thrust total

Performance

- Maximum speed: 2,092 km/h (1,300 mph, 1,130 kn) at 24,000 m (79,000 ft)
- Maximum speed: Mach 1.92
- Service ceiling: 24,000 m (79,000 ft)
- Time to altitude: 15,000 m (49,000 ft) 2 minutes, 15 secs

== See also ==
- Nord 1500 Griffon

Aircraft of comparable role, configuration, and era

- Republic XF-91 Thunderceptor
- Saunders-Roe SR.53
- Saunders-Roe SR.177
- SNCASE SE-212 Durandal
