= Armstrong Siddeley Screamer =

1950s British aircraft rocket engine

Screamer
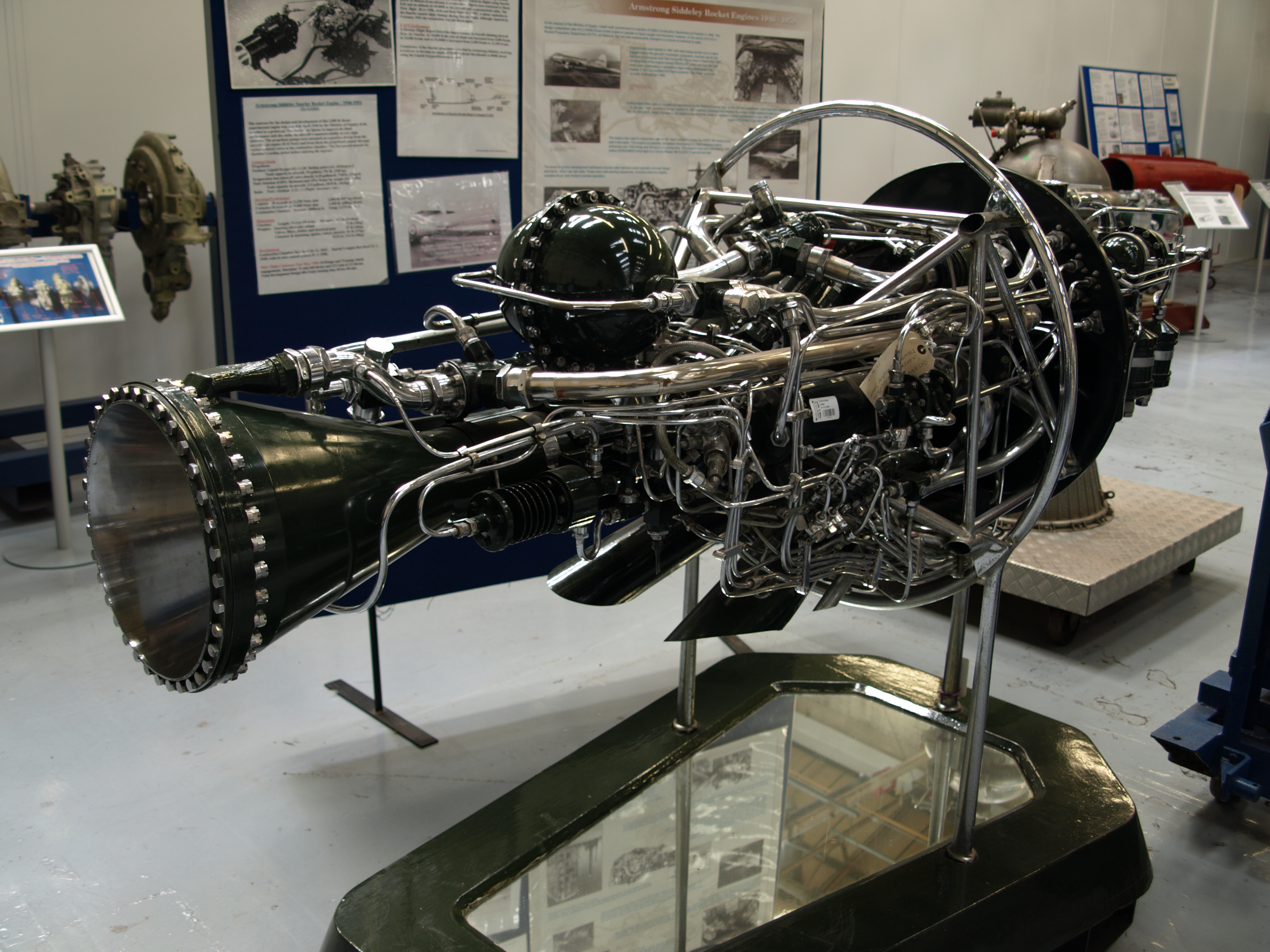
- Screamer engine on display at the Rolls-Royce Heritage Trust, Derby
- Type: Rocket engine
- National origin: United Kingdom
- Manufacturer: Armstrong Siddeley
- First run: 19 May 1954

The Armstrong Siddeley Screamer was a British rocket engine intended to power the Avro 720 manned interceptor aircraft (Avro's competitor to the Saunders-Roe SR.53 for a rocket-powered interceptor). Thrust was variable, up to a maximum of 8,000 lbf (36 kN).

== Design and development ==
Work on the Screamer started in 1946, with the first static test at Armstrong Siddeley's rocket plant at Ansty in March 1954. The programme was cancelled, as was the Avro 720, before flight testing.

In 1951, a Gloster Meteor F.8 was experimentally fitted with a Screamer mounted below the fuselage.

The Screamer project was cancelled in March 1956, at a reported total cost of £650,000.

== Engines on display ==
- A preserved Screamer is part of the engine collection on display at the Rolls-Royce Heritage Trust in Derby.

== Specifications ==
=== General characteristics ===
- Type: Variable thrust liquid-propellant rocket engine
- Length: 78.5 in (199.4 cm)
- Diameter: 27 in (68.6)
- Dry weight: 470 lb (213.2 kg)
- Fuel: Kerosene
- Oxidiser: Liquid oxygen (LOX) and filtered water (coolant)

=== Components ===
- Pumps: Three pumps

=== Performance ===
- Thrust: 9,500 lb (42 kN) at 40,000 ft (12,200 metres) (estimated)
- Burn time:

== See also ==
Comparable engines

- Bristol Siddeley 605
- de Havilland Spectre
- Napier Scorpion

Related lists

- List of aircraft engines
