= List of rocket-powered aircraft =

A rocket-powered aircraft or rocket plane is an aircraft that uses a rocket engine for propulsion, sometimes in addition to airbreathing jet engines. Rocket planes can achieve much higher speeds than similarly sized jet aircraft, but typically for at most a few minutes of powered operation, followed by a gliding flight. Unhindered by the need for oxygen from the atmosphere, they are suitable for very high-altitude flight. They are also capable of delivering much higher acceleration and shorter takeoffs. Many rocket aircraft may be drop launched from transport planes, as take-off from ground may leave them with insufficient time to reach high altitudes.

| Type | Country | Class | Role | Date | Status | No. | Notes |
|---|---|---|---|---|---|---|---|
| Arado E.381 Kleinstjäger | Germany | Air launch | Fighter | 1944 | Project | 0 | Carried by an Arado Ar 234. |
| Avión Torpedo | Peru | VTOL | Rocket plane | 1902 | Project | | Avant-garde design using liquid propellant rockets installed in the tiltwing when swiveled, capable of vertical or horizontal flight. |
| Avro 720 | UK | CTOL | | 1956 | Project | 0 | Mixed power. |
| Avro Z-101 | UK | Air launch | Research | 1961 | Project | 0 | Manned variant of the Blue Steel missile. |
| Bachem Ba 349 "Natter" | Germany | VTOL | Fighter | 1945 | Production | 36 | Point defence interceptor. Never saw action (debatable footage, seems to show a Ba 349 in combat.). |
| Bell X-1 | USA | Air launch | Research | 1947 | Prototype | 7 | First aircraft to break the sound barrier in level flight. |
| Bell X-2 | USA | Air launch | Research | 1955 | Prototype | 2 | Supersonic. |
| Bereznyak-Isayev BI-1 | USSR | CTOL | Fighter | 1942 | | 9 | |
| Bisnovat 5 | USSR | CTOL | | 1948 | Project | | Based on captured DFS 346. Never flew under power. |
| Cattaneo Magni RR | Italy | CTOL | Research | 1931 | Prototype | | |
| Cheranovsky RP-1 | USSR | CTOL | Research | 1932 | Prototype | | Test in 1933 ended in engine failure. |
| DFS 194 | Germany | CTOL | Experimental | 1940 | Operational | 1 | Tailless, direct predecessor of Me 163 series. |
| Douglas D-558-2 Skyrocket | USA | Air launch | Research | 1953 | Operational | 3 | Supersonic. |
| EZ-Rocket | USA | CTOL | Experimental | 2001 | Prototype | 1 | Rocket-powered variant of Rutan Long-EZ. |
| Fairey 124T Design A | UK | CTOL | | 1952 | Project | 0 | Delta wing rocket fighter powered by AW “Screamer” motor plus 6x booster rockets wrapped around the rear lower fuselage for take-off assistance. |
| Focke-Wulf Volksjäger | Germany | CTOL | Fighter | 1944 | Project | 0 | Three rocket-powered variants under construction at the end of hostilities. |
| Hawker P.1072 | UK | CTOL | | 1949 | Prototype | 1 | Mixed power. |
| Heinkel He 112R | Germany | CTOL | Experimental | 1937 | Operational | 1 | Rocket and piston engines. |
| Heinkel He 176 | Germany | CTOL | Research | 1939 | Prototype | 1 | Pioneering liquid-fueled rocket propulsion aircraft. |
| He P.1077 Julia | Germany | CTOL | Fighter | 1944 | Project | 0 | |
| Horten Rocket Wing | Germany | CTOL | Concept | 1945 | Project | 0 | Prone pilot flying wing fighter. |
| Ju EF.127 Walli | Germany | CTOL | Fighter | 1944 | Project | 0 | |
| Korolyov RP-318 | USSR | CTOL | Research | 1940 | | 1 | |
| Lavochkin La-7R | USSR | CTOL | | 1945 | | 1 | Rocket and piston engines. |
| Lippisch Ente | Germany | CTOL | Research | 1928 | Prototype Opel-RAK program | 1 | First rocket-powered aircraft, part of Opel-RAK program. |
| Lockheed NF-104A | USA | CTOL | Trainer | 1963 | | 3 | Rocket and jet engines. |
| Martin Marietta X-24A | USA | Air launch | Research | 1969 | Prototype | 1 | Lifting body. |
| Martin Marietta X-24B | USA | Air launch | Research | 1973 | Prototype | 1 | Lifting body. |
| Messerschmitt Me 163 | Germany | CTOL | Fighter | 1941 | Production | 10 A-subtype; ~360 B-subtype | Tailless, B-version saw combat May 1944-May 1945. |
| Messerschmitt Me 263 | Germany | CTOL | Fighter | 1944 | | 3 | Also known as Ju 248, development of Me 163. |
| Messerschmitt P.1104 | Germany | Air launch | Fighter | 1944 | Project | 0 | |
| Mitsubishi J8M | Japan | CTOL | Fighter | 1945 | | 7 | Was to have been a licensed Messerschmitt Me 163 but the plans were lost so was only similar. |
| Mizuno Shinryu II | Japan | CTOL | | 1945 | Project | 0 | Second aircraft developed in Japan to use a canard design after the J7W1. |
| North American X-15 | USA | Air launch | Research | 1959 | Operational | 3 | Hypersonic. Later variants capable of sub-orbital space flight. |
| Northrop XP-79 | USA | CTOL | Fighter | 1944 | Prototype | 1 | Flying wing. Converted to jet power for first and only flight. |
| Opel RAK.1 | Germany | CTOL | Research | 1929 | Operational | 1 | First purpose-built rocket-powered aircraft, Opel-RAK program. |
| Republic XF-91 Thunderceptor | USA | CTOL | | 1949 | | 2 | Rocket and jet engines. |
| Rikugun Ki-202 | Japan | CTOL | Fighter | 1945 | | 0 | Improved J8M/Ki-200 with the elongated fuselage. |
| RRL Mark-III X-racer | USA | CTOL | Racer | 2010 | | 1 | |
| RRL Mark I X-racer | USA | CTOL | Racer | 2006 | | 1 | Customized Velocity SE, prototype for Rocket Racing League. |
| Saunders-Roe SR.53 | UK | CTOL | Fighter | 1957 | Prototype | 2 | Jet and rocket power. |
| Saunders-Roe SR.177 | UK | CTOL | Fighter | 1958 | Project | 0 | Jet and rocket power. Development of SR.53. |
| Silbervogel | Germany | CTOL | Suborbital Bomber | 1941 | Project | 0 | Designed to reach very high altitudes and glide to targets in North America. |
| SNCASO Trident | France | CTOL | Experimental | 1953 | Prototype | 8 | Jet and rocket power. |
| SNCASE SE.212 Durandal | France | CTOL | Fighter | 1956 | Prototype | 2 | Mixed power. |
| Sombold So 344 | Germany | Air launch | | 1944 | Project | 0 | bomber box buster with a detachable explosive nose. |
| Sukhoi Su-7 | USSR | CTOL | | 1944 | | 1 | Sukhoi Su-6 with rocket and piston engines. |
| von Braun Interceptor | Germany | VTOL | | 1939 | Project | 0 | Used a launch vehicle for take off from a hangar vertically similar to a V2 rocket. |
| Westland Design B | UK | CTOL | | 1952 | Project | 0 | Delanne wing rocket fighter armed with 2x Blue Jay missiles and powered with 2x DH Spectre rocket motors. |
| Yakovlev Yak-3RD | USSR | CTOL | | 1945 | Prototype | 1 | Modified Yakovlev Yak-3 with rocket and piston engines. |
| Yokosuka MXY7 Ohka | Japan | Air launch | Attack | 1945 | Production | | Kamikaze aircraft. |
| Zeppelin Fliegende Panzerfaust | Germany | Air launch | | 1944 | Project | 0 | Towed behind a Messerschmitt Bf 109G. |
| Zeppelin Rammer | Germany | Air launch | Fighter | 1944 | Project | 0 | Designed to use the aerial ramming technique against Allied bombers. |

== See also ==
- Zero-length launch
- JATO
- CAM ship
