= Von Braun Interceptor =

Proposed German rocket-powered interceptor

von Braun Interceptor

General information
- Type: Interceptor
- Designer: Wernher von Braun
- Status: Proposal abandoned
- Primary user: Luftwaffe (intended)
- Number built: 0

History
- Developed into: Fieseler Fi 166; Bachem Ba 349 Natter

The von Braun Interceptor was a VTOL rocket-powered interceptor designed by Wernher von Braun. This aircraft would have used the technology Von Braun had developed for the V-2 rocket during World War II. Von Braun put forward the proposal to Reichsluftfahrtministerium, on July 6, 1939, but project was ultimately not built.

== Background ==
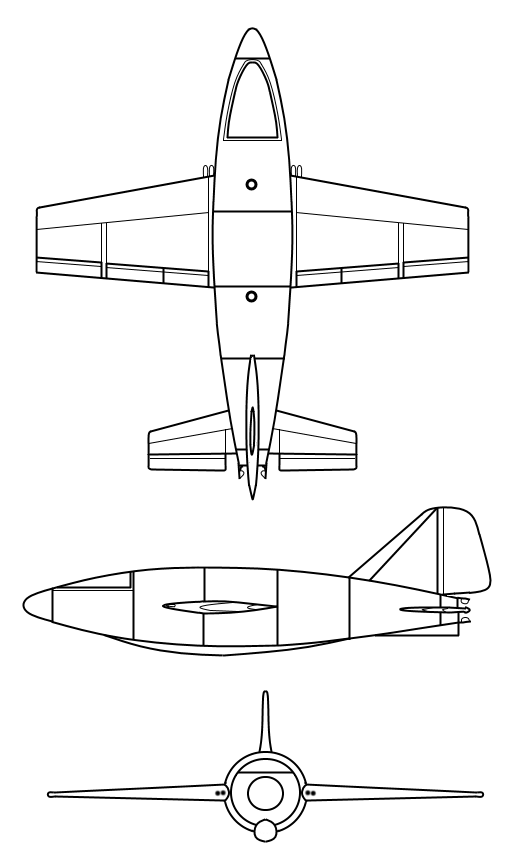
Von Braun Stratosphärenjäger I

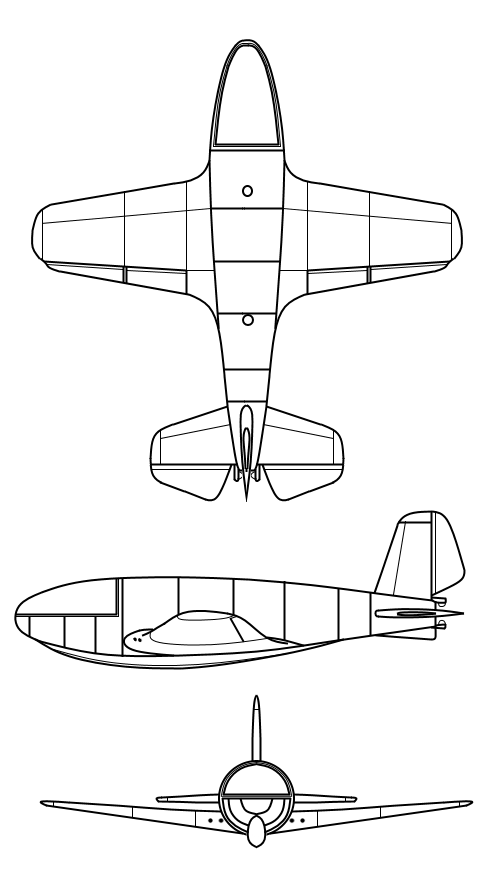
Von Braun Stratosphärenjäger II

In 1936, von Braun worked to convert some propeller aircraft to be powered by more powerful rocket engines. In 1937, the He 112 V3 and He 112 V5 were fitted with rocket engines, but the V3 was destroyed when it suffered an engine explosion during a test. The He 112 V5, piloted by test pilot Erich Warsitz, was flown to 800 meters (2,625 feet), where Warsitz fired the rocket motor. The He 112 V5 was the first aircraft to be powered by a liquid-fueled rocket engine, paving the way for more rocket-powered planes built by Germany during World War II.

== Design ==
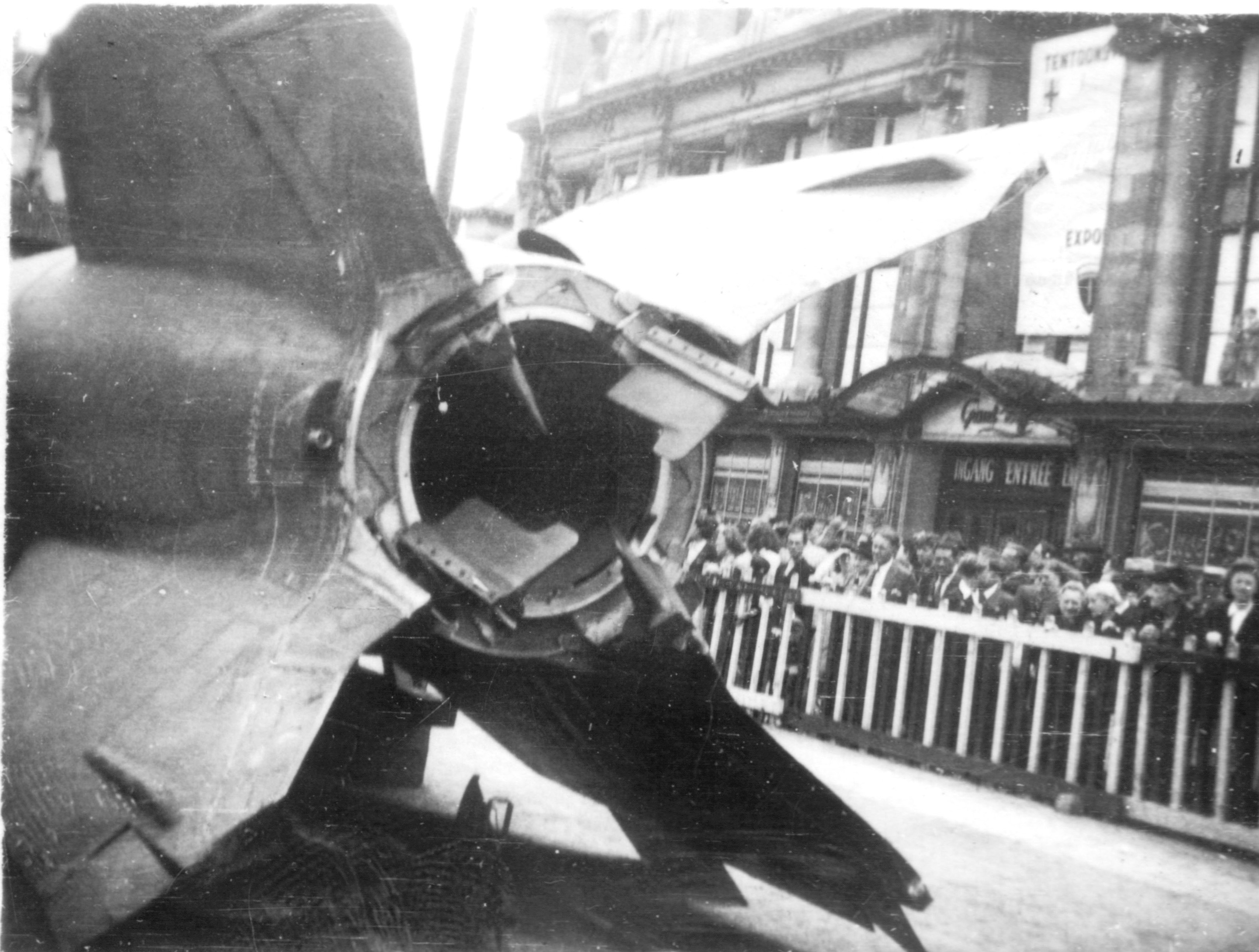
Captured V-2 on public display at Antwerp in 1945. Exhaust vanes and external rudders in tail section shown. The Von Braun Interceptor design used the same exhaust vanes to control the Vertical Take Off of the Von Braun Interceptor

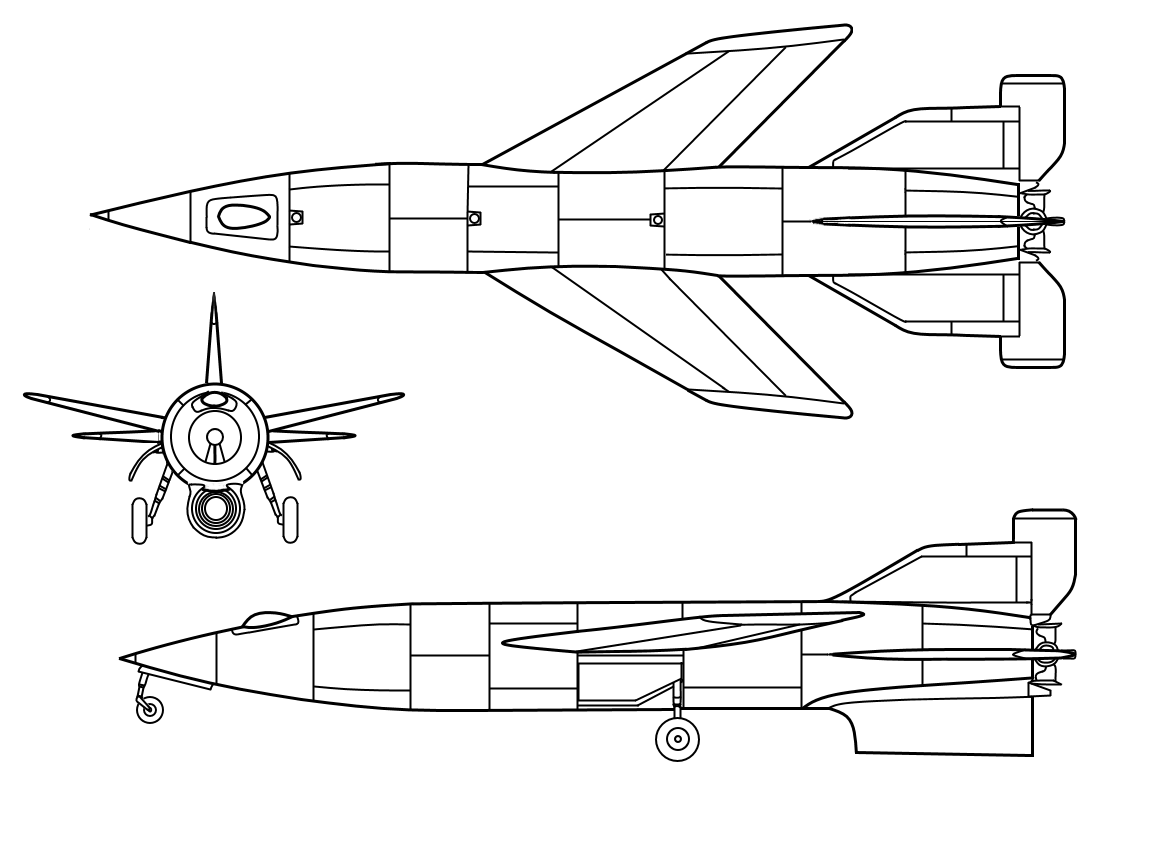
EMW A6 Von Braun Interceptor

The von Braun Interceptor featured a conventional design with straight, tapered wings. Two fuel tanks, one with alcohol and the other with liquid-oxygen, where located behind the pilot, while the rocket engine was located in the tail. The aircraft was to have an armored, pressurized cockpit for high-altitude flight. The von Braun Interceptor would take off vertically like the V-2 rocket. The plane would be stored, fueled and readied for takeoff in a hangar with its nose pointed to the sky, and thus would not need an airfield. The aircraft would slide out on two rails to take off or to be loaded onto a launch vehicle. As the aircraft climbed to altitude, the vanes in the rocket exhaust would be used for control. As the aircraft moved from vertical to horizontal flight the pilot would move to conventional controls and an auxiliary combustion chamber. After the attack, the aircraft would glide back to the base. The 1936 design was very much ahead of its time, as the V-2 rocket would not make its first flight until 1944. This is one of the reasons that the project was not adopted in 1936. A second design for the von Braun Interceptor had wings with rounded ends and used Visol and SV-Stoff for fuel. With the new fuel, the von Braun Interceptor would be launched from a truck and was intended to be easier to fuel. The von Braun Interceptor was to be armed with four guns; two per wing.

The von Braun Interceptor plans were given to the Fieseler Company, which developed it into the Fi 166 in 1941. The von Braun Interceptor also inspired the Bachem Ba 349 Natter.

== See also ==
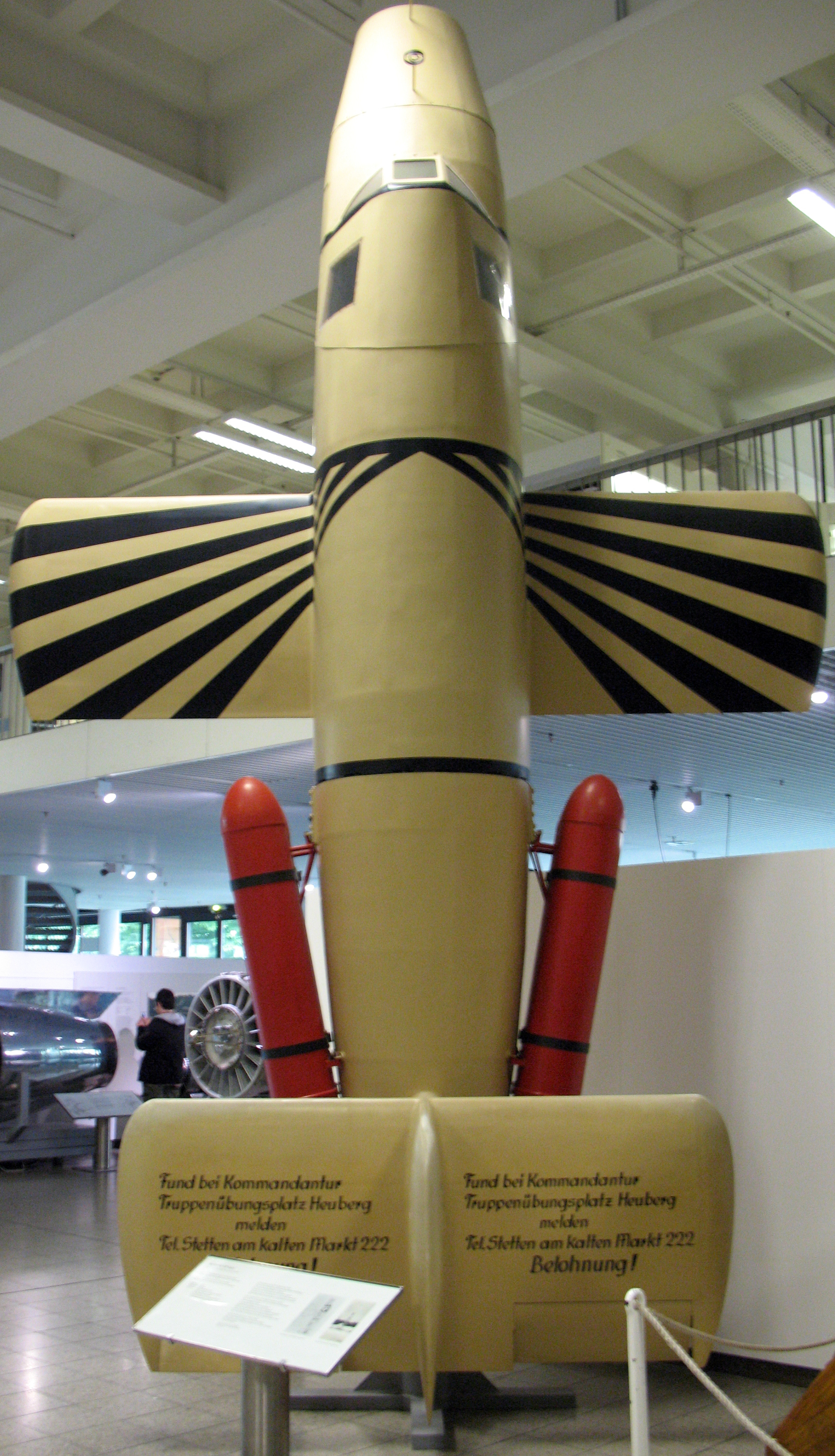
A replica of the Bachem Ba 349 Natter at the Deutsches Museum in Munich, Germany, the Bachem Ba 349 was inspired by the von Braun Interceptor

- Emergency Fighter Program
- Emergency fighter
- List of German aircraft projects, 1939–45
- Messerschmitt Me 163 Komet
- Arado E.381 Kleinstjäger
- Blohm & Voss P 214
- Focke-Wulf Volksjäger 2
- Heinkel P.1077 Julia
- Junkers EF 127 Walli
- Messerschmitt P.1103
- Sombold So 344
- Zeppelin Fliegende Panzerfaust
- Zeppelin Rammer
