= Cattaneo =

Cattaneo (Italian: [katˈtaːneo] is an Italian surname.

== Geographical distribution ==
As of 2014, 81.2% of all known bearers of the surname Cattaneo were residents of Italy (frequency 1:1,232), 9.0% of Argentina (1:7,742), 2.8% of Switzerland (1:4,802), 1.9% of the United States, 1.8% of France (1:59,595) and 1.2% of Brazil (1:290,914).

In Italy, the frequency of the surname was higher than the national average (1:1,232) only in one region: Lombardy (1:223).

== People ==
- Adelardo Cattaneo (?–1225), Italian cardinal
- Agustín Cattaneo (born 1988), Argentine footballer
- Alberto Cattaneo (born 1967), Italian mathematician
- Annibale Cattaneo (?–1584), Italian Roman Catholic bishop
- Atilio Cattáneo (1889–1957), Argentine politician
- Bartolomeo Cattaneo (1883–1949), Italian archbishop and diplomat
- Bernadette Cattanéo (1899–1963), French trade unionist and militant communist
- Carlo Cattaneo (admiral) (1883–1941), Italian admiral
- Carlo Cattaneo (mathematician) (1911–1979), Italian mathematician
- Carlo Cattaneo (writer) (1801–1869), Italian politician, nationalist, writer and philosopher
- Cristoforo Cattaneo (16th century), Italian humanist author
- Danese Cattaneo (1512–1572), Tuscan sculptor and medallist
- Fausto Cattaneo, Italian physicist
- Francesco Costanzo Cattaneo (1602–1665), painter from Ferrara
- Hernán Cattáneo (born 1965), Argentine musician
- Lazzaro Cattaneo (1560–1640), Italian Jesuit, missionary in China
- Leonardo Cattaneo della Volta (1487–16th century), doge of Genoa
- Matias D. Cattaneo (born 1978), Argentine econometrician
- Mattia Cattaneo (born 1990), Italian professional road cyclist
- Peter Cattaneo (born 1964), British film director
- Pilar Cattaneo (born 2007), Argentine gymnast
- Santo Cattaneo (1739–1819), Neoclassic painter from Brescia
- Simonetta Cattaneo Vespucci (1453–1476), noblewoman from Genoa

== See also ==
- Cattaneo Magni RR, a 1930s rocket-powered aircraft
- Gualdo Cattaneo, a small Italian town in Umbria
- Carlo Cattaneo University, an Italian university
- Villa Cattaneo dell'Olmo, historical aristocratic villa in the Cornigliano Campi neighborhood in Genoa, Italy
