= DFS 346 =

German research aircraft, 1948

- Aircraft 346-P

General information
- Type: Research aircraft
- Manufacturer: Siebel; OKB-2
- Designer: Felix Kracht
- Status: Project cancelled
- Primary user: Soviet Air Force
- Number built: 4

History
- First flight: 346-P in 1948 as glider 346-3 in 13.08 1951 with engine
- Retired: 14 September 1951
- Variants: Bisnovat 5

The DFS 346 (Samolyot 346) was a German rocket-powered swept-wing aircraft which began development during World War II in Germany. It was designed by Felix Kracht at the Deutsche Forschungsanstalt für Segelflug (DFS), the "German Institute for Sailplane Flight". A prototype was constructed but did not reach completion before the end of the war. It was taken to the Soviet Union where it was completed, tested and flown (with indifferent success).

== Design ==
The DFS-346 was a midwing design of all-metal construction. The front fuselage of the 346 was a body of rotation based on the NACA-Profile 0012-0,66-50. The middle part was approximately cylindrical and narrowed to the cut off to accommodate vertically arrayed nozzles in back. Probably for volume and weight reasons the DFS-346 was equipped with landing skids, both in the original German design and in the later Soviet prototypes; this caused trouble several times.

The wings had a 45° swept NACA 0012-0,55-1,25 profile of 12% thickness. The continuously varying profile shape caused a stall in certain flight conditions, which caused complete loss of control. This was later corrected by use of fences on the top of the wings.

== Development ==
=== Concept ===
Concept art

Test pilot Rolf Mödel tries out the prone position.

The DFS 346 was a parallel project to the DFS 228 high-altitude reconnaissance aircraft, designed under the direction of Felix Kracht and his team at DFS. While the DFS 228 was essentially of conventional sailplane design, the DFS 346 had highly-swept wings and a highly streamlined fuselage that its designers hoped would enable it to break the sound barrier.

Like its stablemate, it also featured a self-contained escape module for the pilot, a feature originally designed for the DFS 54 prior to the war. The pilot was to fly the machine from a prone position, a feature decided from experience with the first DFS 228 prototype. This was mainly because of the smaller cross-sectional area and easier sealing of the pressurized cabin, but it was also known to help with g-force handling.

The 346 design was intended to be air-launched from the back of a large mother ship aircraft for air launch, the carrier aircraft being the Dornier Do 217. After launch, the pilot would fire the 346's Walter 509B/C twin-chamber "cruiser" engine to accelerate to a proposed speed of Mach 2.6 and altitude of 30,500 meters (100,000 ft). This engine had two chambers — the main, upper Hauptofen combustion chamber as used on the earlier HWK 509A motor; but capable of just over two short tons (4,410 lbf) of thrust at full power (more at altitude), and the lower-thrust Marschofen throttleable chamber below the main unit of either 300 kg (B-version) or 400 kg (C-version) top thrust levels mounted beneath the main chamber. After reaching altitude, the speed could be maintained by short bursts of the lower Marschofen cruise chamber. The question of what rocket-motor subtype was to be used (the 509B or -C) is not adequately addressed here.

In an operational use the plane would then glide over England for a photo-reconnaissance run, descending as it flew but still at a high speed. After the run was complete the engine would be briefly turned on again, to raise the altitude for a long low-speed glide back to a base in Germany or northern France.

=== Prototype construction ===
Since the aircraft was to be of all-metal construction, the DFS lacked the facilities to build it and construction of the prototype was assigned to Siebel Werke located in Halle, where the first windtunnel models and partially built prototype were captured by the advancing Red Army.

=== Post-War ===
On 22 October 1946, the Soviet OKB-2 (Design Bureau 2), under the direction of Hans Rössing and Alexandr Bereznyak, was tasked with continuing its development. The captured DFS 346, now simply called "Samolyot 346" (samolyot means "airplane") to distance it from its German origins, was completed and tested in TsAGI wind tunnel T-101. Tests revealed some aerodynamic deficiencies which would result in unrecoverable stalls at certain angles of attack. This phenomenon involved a loss of longitudinal stability of the airframe. After the wind tunnel tests, two wing fences were installed on a more advanced, longer version of the DFS-346, the purpose of fences was to interrupt the spanwise movement of airflow that would otherwise bring the boundary-layer breakdown and transition from attached to stalled airflow with loss of lift and increase of drag.

This solution was used on the majority of Soviet planes with swept wings of the 1950s and 1960s. In the meantime, the escape capsule system was tested from a B-25J and proved promising. Despite results from studies showing that the plane would not have been able to pass even Mach 1, orders were given to proceed with construction and further testing.

== Operational use ==
In 1947, an entirely new 346 prototype was constructed, incorporating refinements suggested by the tests. This was designated 346-P ("P" for planer - "glider"). No provision was made for a powerplant, but ballast was added to simulate the weight of an engine and fuel. This was carried to altitude by a B-29 Superfortress captured in Vladivostok and successfully flown by Wolfgang Ziese in a series of tests. This led to the construction of three more prototypes, intended to lead to powered flight of the type.

=== First accidents ===
Pilot escape sequence

Newly built 346-1 incorporated minor aerodynamic refinements over the 346-P, and was first flown by Ziese on September 30, 1948, with dummy engines installed. The glider was released at an altitude of 9700 m, and the pilot realised that he hardly could maintain control of the aircraft. Consequently, while attempting to land, he descended too fast (his speed was later estimated at 310 km/h). After first touching the ground he bounced up to a height of 3–4 m and flew 700–800 m. At the second descent, the landing ski collapsed and the fuselage hit the ground hard.

The pilot seat structure and safety-belt proved to be very unreliable, because at the end of a rough braking course Ziese was thrown forward and struck the canopy with his head, losing consciousness. Luckily, he wasn't seriously injured, and after treatment in hospital he was able to return to flying. Accident investigation research team came to the conclusion that the crash was a result of pilot error, who failed to fully release the landing skid. This accident showed that the aircraft handling was still very unpredictable, as a result, all rocket-powered flights were postponed until pilots were able to effectively control the aircraft in unpowered descent, requiring further glide flights.

The damaged 346-1 was later repaired and modified to 346-2 version. It was successfully flown by test pilot P. Kazmin in 1950-1951 winter, but nonetheless these flights also ended "on fuselage". Furthermore, after the last flight of these series, the airframe again required major repairs. On 10 May 1951, Ziese returned to the program, flying final unpowered test flights with the 346-2, and from 6 June, unpowered tests of the 346-3 without accidents.

=== Final flights ===
By the mid-1951 346-3 was completed, and Ziese flew it under power for the first time on 13 August 1951, using only one of the engines. Continuing concerns about the aircraft's stability at high speeds had led to a V_{NE} limit of Mach 0.9 being placed during test flights. Ziese flew it again on 2 September and 14 September. On this last flight, however, things went drastically wrong. Separating from the carrier plane at 9,300 meters (30,500 ft) above Lukovici airfield, the pilot fired the engine and accelerated to a speed of 900 km/h (560 mph). The rocket engine worked as expected, and 346-3, quickly accelerating, started ascending and soon had flown in very close proximity of its carrier aircraft.

Ziese then reported that the plane was not responding to the controls, and was losing altitude. Ground control commanded him to bail out. He used the escape capsule to leave the stricken aircraft at 6,500 meters (21,000 ft) and landed safely by parachute. With the loss of this aircraft, the 346 program was abandoned.

== Variants ==
- DFS-346 - First prototype built by Siebel Werke in the early 1940s. Later taken to USSR where the newly formed OKB-2 tested it in TsAGI wind tunnel. Later scrapped, because it was not flyable.
- 346-P - This airframe was first post-war build of this plane, and was completed in 1948 by German engineers. Visually 346-P was identical to the earlier design, excepting a landing gear cowl which was removed primarily for lightening the airframe. This prototype also featured mounted under wing supports, to help stop the plane when landed.
- 346-1(A) - On 5 May 1949, construction of 346-1 was finished. It had a rocket engine mock up installed, and incorporated some minor changes in the rudder and tail design.
- 346-2(D) - The same as 346-1, but the rocket engines fitted.
- 346-3 - Only plane that flew rocket-engine powered, and twice went transonic.

== Specifications (346-3) ==

346-3 Cross-section

General characteristics

- Crew: one, pilot
- Length: 44 ft 1 in (13.45 m)
- Wingspan: 29 ft 6 in (9 m)
- Height: 11 ft 7 in (3.54 m)
- Wing area: 213 ft^{2} (19.9 m^{2})
- Airfoil: DFS 346#Design
- Empty weight: 4,806 lb (2,100 kg)
- Loaded weight: 11,506 lb (5,230 kg)
- Powerplant: 1× Walter HWK 109-509 rocket, 33.4 kN (7,500 lbf) 33.4 kN

Performance

- Never exceed speed: 2,765 km/h (estimated) (1,723 mph)
- Maximum speed: 900 km/h (verified) (560 mph)
- Service ceiling: 35,000 m (estimated) (114,800 ft)
- Rate of climb: 6,000 m/min (estimated) (19,680 ft/min)

== See also ==
Related development

- Bisnovat 5
- DFS 228

Related lists

- List of World War II military aircraft of Germany
- List of military aircraft of Germany
- List of rocket planes
- List of World War II Luftwaffe aircraft prototype projects
