= DFS 228 =

German reconnaissance aircraft prototype

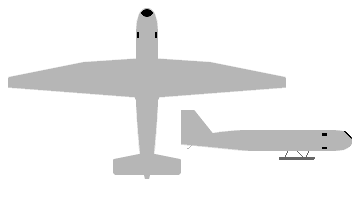

General information
- Type: High-altitude aerial reconnaissance
- Manufacturer: Deutsche Forschungsanstalt für Segelflug
- Designer: Felix Kracht
- Status: Scrapped 1947
- Primary user: Luftwaffe
- Number built: 2

History
- First flight: August 1944
- Retired: June 1945
- Developed from: DFS 54
- Variant: DFS 346

The DFS 228 was a rocket-powered, high-altitude reconnaissance aircraft designed by the Deutsche Forschungsanstalt für Segelflug (DFS - "German Research Institute for Sailplane Flight") during World War II. By the end of the war, the aircraft had only flown in the form of two unpowered prototypes.

== Design and development ==
Initial design of the DFS 228 was undertaken before the outbreak of war as a research aircraft, the DFS 54, aimed at developing a high-altitude escape system for sailplanes. The project was suspended by the commencement of hostilities, but was revived in 1940 when the Reichsluftfahrtministerium (RLM - "Reich Aviation Ministry") delivered the DFS with a requirement for a rocket-powered reconnaissance aircraft.

The advantages of a sailplane for aerial reconnaissance included its silence, its low speed relative to the ground (allowing for higher-quality photography), and its potential ability to loiter above an area of interest. The project gave the DFS the opportunity to investigate two additional areas that it was interested in: the effects of wing sweep on sailplane design, and supersonic flight.

The DFS 228 was designed by Felix Kracht and a first prototype was completed in March 1944; it was undergoing gliding tests by that August, carried aloft piggyback and strut-mounted atop a Dornier Do 217. The aircraft was of conventional sailplane arrangement with long, slender wings and designed to land on a retractable skid mounted on its belly. The nose of the aircraft could be separated in an emergency and formed a self-contained, pressurized escape capsule for the pilot. Because of problems with the cabin pressurization system, the second prototype accommodated the pilot in a prone position.

Forty flights were made with the prototypes, and installation of a rocket was to have taken place in February 1945, but the project fell by the wayside as the war situation became more desperate. The second prototype was destroyed in an air raid in May 1945, and the first prototype was captured by U.S. troops in June. In 1946 it was sent to the United Kingdom for study where it was apparently scrapped in 1947, although its exact fate is unknown.

== Variants ==
DFS 54
Experimental glider with a pressure cabin, oxygen, cabin heating and insulation for high altitude flying.
DFS 228
Powered variant of the DFS 54 with a Walter HWK 509D rocket propulsion unit.

== Specifications (DFS 228 estimated) ==
Data from

General characteristics

- Crew: 1
- Length: 10.58 m (34 ft 9 in)
- Wingspan: 17.56 m (57 ft 7 in)
- Wing area: 30 m^{2} (320 sq ft)
- Empty weight: 1,650 kg (3,638 lb)
- Gross weight: 4,200 kg (9,259 lb)
- Powerplant: 1 × Walter HWK 509D liquid-fuelled rocket motor, 14.71 kN (3,310 lbf) thrust at sea level

16.18 kN (3,637 lbf) at operational altitude

Performance

- Maximum speed: 900 km/h (560 mph, 490 kn) at sea level
- Range: 1,050 km (650 mi, 570 nmi) maximum with intermittent powered flight
- Launch altitude: 10,000 m (33,000 ft)
- Glide descent altitude: 12,000 m (39,000 ft)
- Service ceiling: 22,860 m (75,000 ft)
- Absolute ceiling: 25,000 m (82,000 ft)

== See also ==
Aircraft of comparable role, configuration, and era

- Lockheed U-2

Related lists

- List of military aircraft of Germany
- List of World War II military aircraft of Germany
- List of World War II Luftwaffe aircraft prototype projects
- List of rocket planes
