= Fieseler Fi 166 =

German jet fighter project

Fi 166

General information
- Type: Vertical-launched fighter
- Manufacturer: Fieseler
- Designer: Erich Bachem
- Status: Unbuilt design

In the early 1940s, Erich Bachem, Fieseler Aircraft's technical manager, created two designs for a rocket-launched fighter that could reach high altitudes quicker than conventional fighters.

== Design and development ==
In 1939, Wernher von Braun presented a concept to the German Ministry of Aviation for a fighter aircraft capable of vertical launch to an altitude of 8,000 metres (26,250 ft) using a main engine, before transitioning to horizontal flight powered by a smaller secondary engine.

The Ministry of Aviation initially passed the project to Heinkel for assessment, but it was later transferred to Fieseler, where it received the designation Fi 166. Erich Bachem proposed two designs, both of which envisaged an aircraft launched vertically to high altitude by liquid-fueled rockets before switching to turbojets for the remainder of the flight.

The Fi 166 project never advanced beyond the drawing board. In 1941, Erich Bachem left Fieseler to found Bachem-Werke. In 1944, the Ministry of Aviation issued a requirement for a cheap, short‑range interceptor. To meet this requirement, Bachem revisited the earlier Fi 166 concept, which ultimately led to the development of the Bachem Ba 349 Natter.
