= Felix Kracht =

German aerospace engineer

Felix Kracht (born 13 May 1912 in Krefeld; died 3 October 2002 in Weyhe) was a German engineer.

After graduating from the Technical University of Aachen, he put his theoretical knowledge into practice at the aeronautical association Flugwissenschaftliche Vereinigung Aachen (FVA) by building the performance glider FVA-10 "Rheinland". Kracht made a name for himself when in 1937 he crossed the Alps in this aircraft. He was sent to Deutsche Forschungsanstalt für Segelflug where he developed the DFS 228 glider and the experimental DFS 346 rocket-powered airplane.

After the World War II, he went on to work in France with Nord Aviation before moving back to Germany to head Deutsche Airbus GmbH. Before joining Airbus he was especially known for co-ordinating French and German work on the Transall C-160 military transport aircraft. Felix Kracht joined the Airbus organisation in 1968 and was Airbus' first production director on the A300 programme. He focused on harnessing a broad selection of skills, eliminating redundancies, promoting trans-national collaboration and optimising a unique industrial organisation. Later he became the Senior Vice President and was responsible for production at the Toulouse site until his retirement in 1981. After his retirement, he often acted as an advisor to Airbus.

He died on Thursday 3 October 2002, at the age of 90 at Kirchweyhe near Bremen.
