= Lothar Sieber =

German test pilot

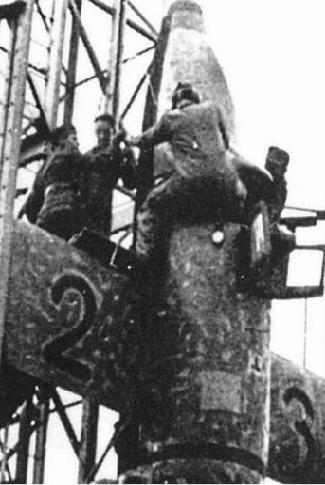
- Lothar Sieber boarding the M23 prototype
- Born: 7 April 1922; Dresden, Germany
- Died: 1 March 1945 (aged 22) near Stetten am kalten Markt, Germany
- Military career
- Allegiance: Nazi Germany
- Branch: Luftwaffe
- Rank: Oberleutnant (posthumous)

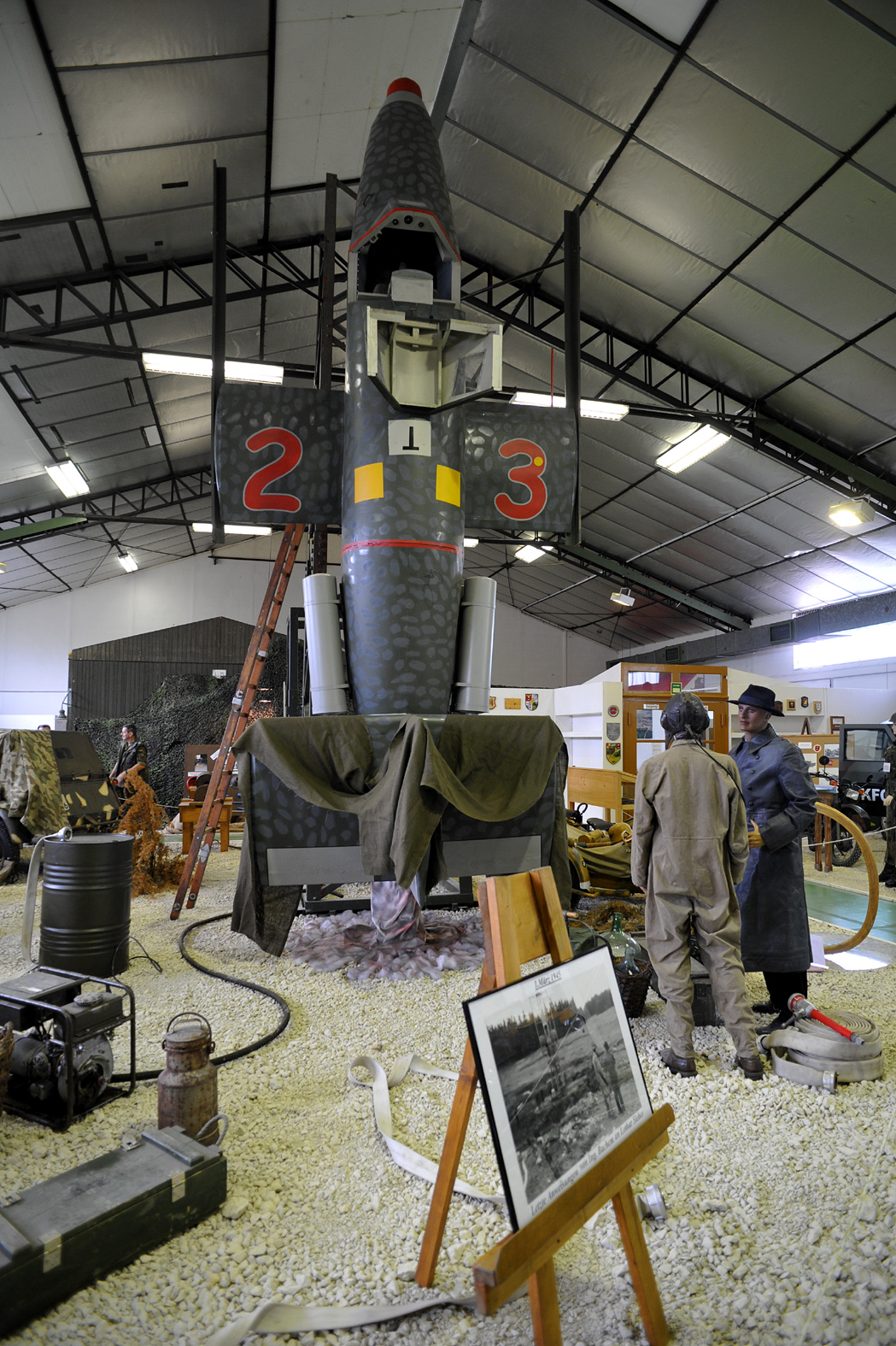
Trailing scene, Sieber discusses with Erich Bachem the final launch preparations, at the Militärgeschichtliche Sammlung Stetten am kalten Markt

Lothar Sieber (7 April 1922 – 1 March 1945) was a German test pilot who was killed in the first vertical take-off manned rocket flight, in a Bachem Ba 349 "Natter".

Before he became a test pilot for Bachem, he piloted an Arado Ar 232 in highly risky sorties. Shortly before his flight, he had become engaged to Gertrud Naudit, a Luftwaffenhelfer. Sieber had held the rank of second lieutenant but was demoted to private after an alcohol-related AWOL. Posthumuously he was promoted to Oberleutnant.

== The first manned vertical-takeoff rocket flight ==
On 1 March 1945, at the Truppenübungsplatz Heuberg, Sieber entered the Natter Ba 349A M23 for the first manned vertical take-off of a rocket. The experienced test pilot was told to execute a half roll if the Natter should veer off course.

Initially, the Natter rose vertically but, at an altitude of about 100 to 150 m (330 to 490 ft), it suddenly pitched up into an inverted curve at about 30° to the vertical. At about 500 m (1,600 ft), after the release of the solid fuel rocket boosters, the cockpit canopy was seen to fly off. The Natter continued to climb at high speed at an angle of 15° from the horizontal and disappeared into the clouds. The Walter engine stalled about 15 seconds after take-off. It is estimated the Natter reached 1,500 m (4,900 ft), at which point it nose-dived and hit the ground with great force about 32 seconds later, some kilometres from the launch site. Unknown at the time, one of the Schmidding boosters failed to jettison and its remains were dug up at the crash site in 1998.

Sieber was likely unconscious long before the crash. Erich Bachem surmised he had involuntarily pulled back on the control column under the effect of the 3 G acceleration. Examination of the canopy, which fell near the launch site, showed the tip of the latch was bent, suggesting it may not have been in the fully closed position at launch. The pilot's headrest had been attached to the underside of the canopy and as the canopy flew off the pilot's head would have snapped back suddenly about 25 cm (9.8 in), hitting the solid wooden rear upper cockpit bulkhead, and either knocking Sieber unconscious or breaking his neck.

== Impact site ==
At the impact site, about 7 kilometres (4 1/2 miles) away, a five-metre-deep (16 ft) crater was found, and except for half of a left arm and half of a left leg, only small body parts were found, and later a 14-centimetre-long (5 1/2 in) part of a skull.

In 1998–1999, excavations found the remains of one of the Starthilfsraketen RATO rockets at the impact site, proving that it did not release from the fuselage of the Natter.

Lothar's remains are buried in a marked grave at Stetten am kalten Markt.

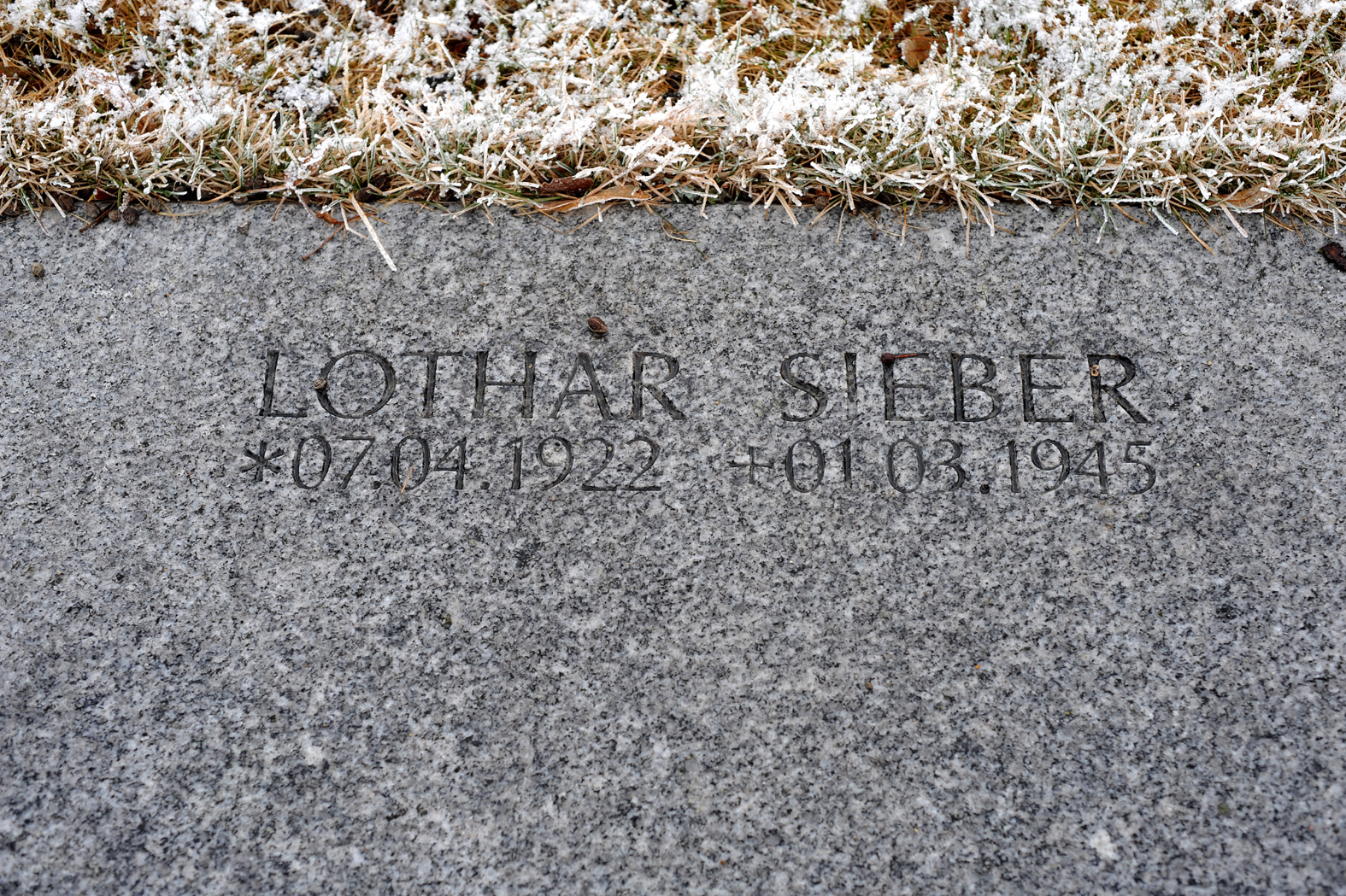
Grave of Lothar Sieber in the cemetery at Stetten am kalten Markt; Baden-Württemberg, Germany

== Aftermath ==
Reconstruction of the flight, which lasted for 55 seconds and covered a horizontal distance of 7 kilometres (4 1/2 mi), calculated an average speed of about 800 km/h (430 kn), thus about 14 km (8 1/2 mi) were traveled in total.

As an experienced test pilot had failed to control the Natter, which was intended to be operated by many inexperienced pilots as an interceptor, the SS cancelled the project. The cause was officially explained as a failure of the canopy, which simply may have not been properly latched before launch.

Sieber's remains were buried with military honors on 3 March 1945.

== See also ==
- Early human rocket flight efforts
- Messerschmitt Me 163
