= Messerschmitt P.1103 =

Proposed German rocket-powered interceptor

Me P.1103

General information
- Type: Interceptor
- Manufacturer: Messerschmitt
- Status: Abandoned
- Primary user: Luftwaffe
- Number built: 0

History
- Developed from: Fieseler Fi 103

The Messerschmitt P.1103 Panzerjäger and P.1104 were a series of rocket-powered interceptors proposed by Messerschmitt.

== Design and development ==
The P.1103 and P.1104 were proposed in the early summer of 1944, with drawings for the proposals being finalized in August and September of that year. Both were light-weight interceptors of mostly wood construction and powered by a single rocket engine. The wings and vertical tail were adapted from the V-1 flying bomb. The fighter would be towed into the air behind a Messerschmitt Bf 109G or Messerschmitt Me 262.

The P.1103 and P.1104 were in competition with the Heinkel P.1077 and Bachem Ba 349, the latter being selected by the Luftwaffe over the others. Work on the P.1103 and P.1104 was abandoned in September 1944 to allow Messerchmitt to focus on the Me 262 and P.1101 projects.

== Variants ==
P.1103/I (P.1103A)
Initial proposal for the P.1103, dated July 6, 1944. It was to have a low-wing configuration and be powered by a Schmidding 109-513 solid-fueled rocket engine and armed with a single 30 mm MK 108 cannon under the cockpit. Pilot sat in a prone position with a single 30 mm MK 108 cannon under the cockpit. External armament was proposed, with either a single Werfer-Granate 21 for aerial targets or a single Werfer-Granate 28/32 for ground targets. Landing was to have been accomplished with a parachute.

P.1103/II (P.1103B)
Finalized proposal dated September 12, 1944. It was to have a high-wing configuration and be powered by a liquid-fueled Walter RI 202 rocket engine. Pilot sat in an upright position with a single 30 mm MK 108 cannon under the cockpit. Landing was to have been accomplished with a retractable landing skid.

P.1104/I (P.1104A)
Finalized proposal dated September 12, 1944. It was to have a mid-wing configuration and be powered by a liquid-fueled Walter HWK 109-509A-1 rocket engine. Pilot sat in an upright position with a single 30 mm MK 108 cannon under the cockpit. Landing was to have been accomplished with a retractable landing skid.

P.1104/II (P.1104B)
Finalized proposal dated September 12, 1944. It was to have a high-wing configuration and be powered by a liquid-fueled Walter HWK 109-509A-1 rocket engine. Pilot sat in an upright position with a single 30 mm MK 108 cannon under the cockpit. Landing was to have been accomplished with a retractable landing skid.

== Specifications (P.1103/I, as proposed) ==
General characteristics

- Crew: 1
- Length: 4.7 m (15 ft 5 in)
- Wingspan: 6.2 m (20 ft 4 in)
- Powerplant: 1 × Schmidding 109-513 solid-propellant rocket engine

Performance

- Maximum speed: 810 km/h (503 mph, 437 kn)

Armament

- 1x 30 mm MK 108 cannon
- 1x Werfer-Granate 21 or 1x Werfer-Granate 28/32

== See also ==
Aircraft of comparable role, configuration, and era

- Bachem Ba 349
- Heinkel P.1077
- Junkers EF 126
- Junkers EF 127

Related lists

- List of German aircraft projects, 1939–45
