= Heinkel P.1077 =

German rocket-powered interceptor project

He P.1077
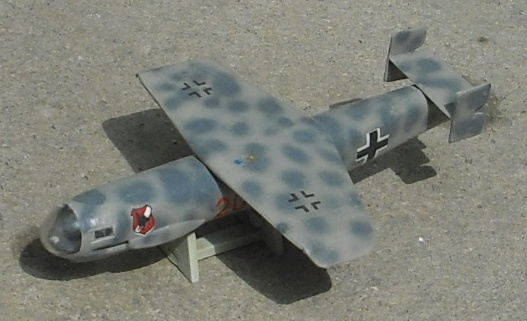
- He P.1077 Julia model.

General information
- Type: Interceptor
- Manufacturer: Heinkel
- Status: Terminated by end of war
- Primary user: Luftwaffe
- Number built: Only one model completed

The Heinkel P.1077 (or He P.1077) was a single seat interceptor design developed for the Luftwaffe by Heinkel under the Emergency Fighter Program during the last year of the Third Reich. This rocket-powered project was originally known as He P.1068, but that name was later used for a Heinkel design project for a turbojet-powered medium bomber.

== Design and development ==
This airplane was one of the products of the last phase of the Third Reich, when the lack of materials and the dire need to put up a strong defense against the devastating Allied bombing raids required such craft to be built as quickly as possible in underground factories. Comparable models were the Junkers EF 127 Walli and the Messerschmitt P.1104. In the design of such small aircraft little thought was given to the safety and comfort of the pilots who were intended mostly to be young Nazis motivated by fanaticism, much as was intended for the Heinkel He 162.

The pilot would have flown the aircraft from a prone position. Takeoff was to be aided by four solid fuel RATO boosters which were jettisoned at burnout, and a jettisonable "trolley" sled for take-off. It would climb at a nearly vertical angle to operational altitude, after which the pilot would have only five minutes for combat action, before gliding the aircraft to land on a fixed skid.

== Variants ==
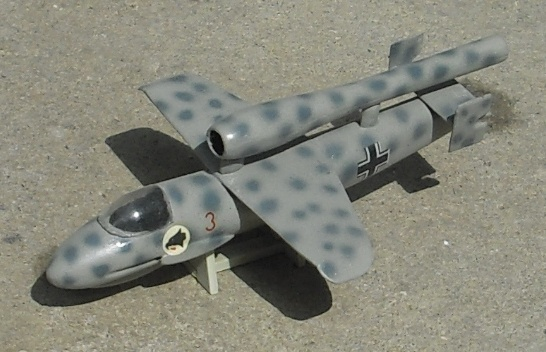
He P.1077 Romeo model, a variant with a pulse jet booster

P.1077 Julia I and Julia II
Rocket (Walter HWK 109-509) powered interceptor project. One prototype unit was built, but was destroyed by an Allied air raid over Vienna on December 22, 1944, before having flown.

P.1077 Romeo
Pulse-jet (Argus As 014) powered interceptor project. Unbuilt concept.

== Specifications (Projected - He P.1077 Julia) ==
General characteristics

- Crew: one
- Length: 6.47 m (21 ft 3 in)
- Wingspan: 4.60 m (15 ft 1 in)
- Height: 1.00 m (3 ft 3 in)
- Wing area: 7.30 m^{2} (78.6 sq ft)
- Max takeoff weight: 1,800 kg (3,968 lb)
- Powerplant: 1 × Walter HWK 109-509 , 17 kN (3,800 lbf) thrust
- Powerplant: 4 × take-off rockets , 12 kN (2,700 lbf) thrust each

Performance

- Maximum speed: 1,000 km/h (620 mph, 540 kn)
- Time to altitude: 10,000 m in 52 seconds

Armament

- Guns: 2x 30 mm (1.181 in) MK 108 cannon

== See also ==
- Bachem Ba 349 Natter
- List of German aircraft projects, 1939–45
- List of rocket aircraft
