= Abate GP.1 =

Italian glider constructed by university students in Pavia in 1925

GP1

General information
- Type: Club glider
- National origin: Italy
- Manufacturer: Students of the University of Pavia
- Designer: Ugo Abate
- Number built: 1

History
- First flight: 1925-6

The GP1 was an Italian glider constructed by university students in Pavia in 1925. Only one was built.

== Design and development ==
The GP1 was a simple single seat glider designed by Ugo Abate and built by students of the University of Pavia during 1925 or 1926. The letters GP were in memory of Giovanni Pirelli, killed in a gliding accident. It was a wooden framed aircraft, covered in plywood and fabric.

The GP.1 was a cantilever, high-wing monoplane with its two spar wing mounted just above the fuselage on a low pedestal. The wing was built in three separable parts for ease of transport, with a rectangular centre section and slightly straight tapered outer panels with rounded tips, carrying slotted ailerons. All three panels were fabric-covered. Its rectangular cross-section fuselage was built of spruce and was ply covered. The cockpit opening was a simple rectangular uncovered cut out in the top of the fuselage in front of the wing leading edge. Aft, the fuselage narrowed markedly to a conventional tail with a parallel chord, round tipped tailplane mounted below the level of the wing. Its elevators had a deep central cut-out, even though the rudder did not extend below them. The vertical tail was of high aspect ratio and was upright and rectangular, apart from some taper on the leading edge of the upper fin. All the tail surfaces were fabric-covered. The GP.1 was fitted with a conventional wooden landing skid on rubber shock absorbers, with a tail bumper.

Ettore Cattaneo set a new Italian gliding distance record of 11.5 km (7.1 mi) on 18 December 1926, flying the sole GP.1 from the high pasture of Campo dei Fiori di Varese (English: Field of Flowers of Varese).

In 1931, Cattaneo extensively modified the GP.1 in order to create the Cattaneo Magni RR, the first piloted rocket-powered aircraft to have flown outside of Germany.

== Specifications ==
Data from Pedrielli (2011) p.181

General characteristics

- Crew: One
- Length: 6.20 m (20 ft 4 in)
- Wingspan: 17.80 m (58 ft 5 in)
- Wing area: 24.50 m^{2} (263.7 sq ft)
- Aspect ratio: 12.93
- Empty weight: 138 kg (304 lb)
- Gross weight: 208 kg (459 lb)

Performance

- Maximum glide ratio: estimated 21.50
- Wing loading: 8.50 kg/m^{2} (1.74 lb/sq ft)
