= Point-defence =

Defence of a single object or a limited area

Point defence (or point defense; see spelling differences) is the defence of a single object or a limited area, e.g. a ship, building or an airfield, now usually against air attacks and guided missiles. Point defence weapons have a smaller range in contrast to area-defence systems and are placed near or on the object to be protected.

Point defence may include:

- Short-ranged interceptor aircraft
- Close-in weapon systems (CIWS) on ships, or C-RAM on land installations
- Directed-energy weapons (DEW), such as high-energy lasers (HEL) or microwave beams
- Land-based short-ranged anti-aircraft guns or surface-to-air missile systems
- Active protection systems on tanks or other armoured fighting vehicles

Coastal artillery to protect harbours is similar conceptually, but is generally not classified as point defence. Similarly, passive systems—electronic countermeasures, decoys, chaff, flares, barrage balloons—are not considered point defence.

== Examples ==
=== Aircraft ===
- Bachem Ba 349 Natter – vertical take-off rocket powered crewed interceptor (prototypes only)
- Convair XF-92 – Later used as testbed for later projects.
- F-14 ADC – Proposed interceptor for the USAF Air Defense Command.
- Junkers EF 009 Hubjäger – Proposed interceptor with 10 radially placed turbojet engines.
- Messerschmitt Me 163 Komet – World War II-era operational German rocket powered interceptor.
- NR-349 – Proposed Improved Manned Interceptor replacement for the F-101, F-102 and F-106.

=== Close-in weapons systems ===
- Goalkeeper CIWS – Gun CIWS in current service by the Dutch navy.
- Phalanx CIWS – 20 mm Vulcan cannon mounted on a swivelling base. Notably used on almost all major surface combatants of the US Navy.
- Kashtan CIWS – Gun-Missile CIWS in current service by the Russian navy.
- Type 730 – in current use by the Chinese Navy.

=== Directed-energy weapons ===
- DragonFire – UK-built high energy laser.
- HELIOS - US-built high energy laser

=== Surface-to-air missile systems ===
- RIM-116 RAM – Missile CIWS in current use by the US Navy.
- Barak 1 – Israeli point defence missile.
- VL-SRSAM – Indian point and area defence missile.

=== Active Protection Systems ===
- Arena APS – a Russian point defence system for individual armoured vehicles.
- Trophy APS - an Israeli APS in service with the IDF.

== See also ==
- Index of aviation articles
- List of established military terms
- Zero-length launch
- List of government and military acronyms
- List of military tactics
