= Zero-length launch =

Method of launching military aircraft

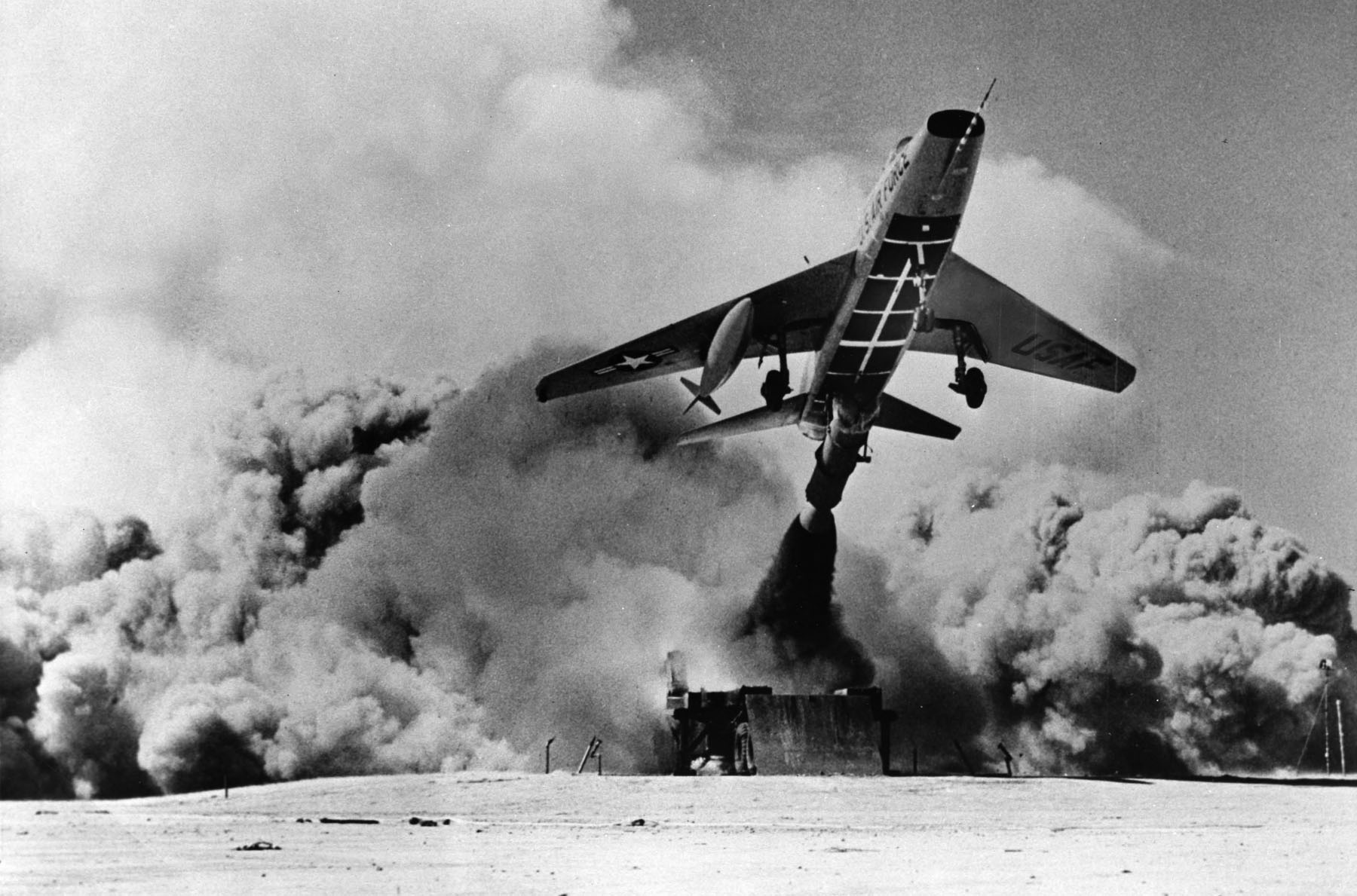
A USAF F-100D Super Sabre using a zero-length-launch system

The zero-length launch system or zero-length take-off system (ZLL, ZLTO, ZEL, ZELL) is a PTOL method whereby jet fighters and attack aircraft could be launched using rocket motors to rapidly gain speed and altitude, in particular for point-defence roles. Such rocket boosters were limited to a short burn duration, were typically solid-fuel and suitable for only a single use. They were intended to drop away once expended.

The majority of ZELL experiments, which including the conversion of several front-line combat aircraft for trialing the system, occurred during the 1950s amid the formative years of the Cold War. As envisioned, the operational use of ZELL would have employed mobile launch platforms to disperse and hide aircraft, reducing their vulnerability in comparison to being centralised around established airbases with well-known locations. While flight testing had proved such systems to be feasible for combat aircraft, no ZELL-configured aircraft were ever used operationally. The emergence of ever-capable missiles had greatly reduced the strategic necessity of aircraft for the nuclear strike mission, while questions over practicality had also played a role.

== History ==
During the second world war, Germany experimented with the Bachem Ba 349, but development was cut short by the end of the war.

According to aviation author Tony Moore, the concept of the zero-length launch system became popular amongst military planners and strategists during the early years of the Cold War. Conventional aircraft, reliant on large and well-established airbases, were thought to be too easily destroyed in the opening hours of a major conflict between the superpowers, thus the ability to remove this dependence upon lengthy runways and airbases was highly attractive. During the 1950s, various countries began experimenting with a diverse range of methods to launch armed fighter jets, typically using some arrangement of rocket motors. In some concepts, such a fighter could be launched from a trailer from virtually any location, including those that could be camouflaged or otherwise concealed up until the moment of launch.

The primary advantage of a zero-length launch system is the elimination of the historic dependence on vulnerable airfields for air operations. In the event of a sudden attack, air forces equipped with such systems could field effective air defenses and launch their own airstrikes even with their own airbases having been destroyed by an early nuclear attack. Although launching aircraft using rocket boosters proved to be relatively trouble-free, a runway was still required for these aircraft to be able to land or else be forced to ditch. The mobile launching platforms also proved to be expensive to operate and somewhat bulky, typically making them difficult to transport. The security of the mobile launchers themselves would have been a major responsibility in and of itself, especially in the case of such launchers being equipped with nuclear-armed strike fighters.

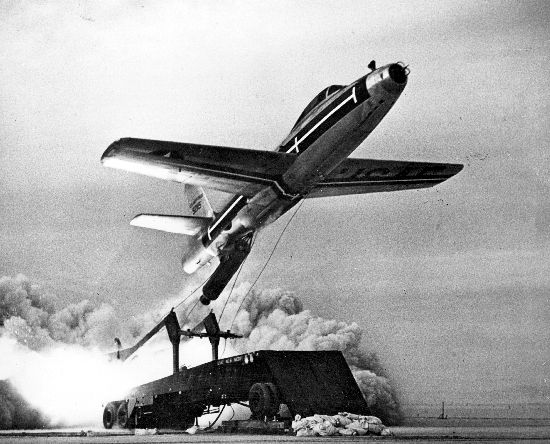
F-84 during ZELL testing

The United States Air Force, the Bundeswehr's Luftwaffe, and the Soviet VVS all conducted experiments in zero-length launching. The first manned aircraft to be ZELL-launched was an F-84G in 1955. The Soviets' main interest in ZELL was for point defense-format protection of airfields and critical targets using MiG-19s. The American tests with the F-84s started with using the Martin MGM-1 Matador solid-fuel boost motor of some 240-kilonewton (54,000 lb) thrust output, which burned out seconds after ignition and dropped away from the manned fighter a second or two later. Tests of the larger F-100 Super Sabre and SM-30 (MiG-19) (with the SM-30 using the Soviet-design PRD-22R booster unit) used similar short-burn solid fueled boost motors, albeit of a much more powerful 600-kilonewton (130,000 lb) thrust-class output levels.

Testing proved that the F-100 was capable of a ZELL launch even while carrying both an external fuel tank and a single nuclear weapon mounted on its hard points. The conceived mission profile would have been for the pilot to have launched a retaliatory nuclear strike against the attacker before attempting to return to any available friendly airbase, or having to eject from the aircraft if a safe landing site could not be reached. Despite the extremely high thrust generated by the rocket motor, the F-100 reportedly subjected its pilot to a maximum of 4 g of acceleration forces during the takeoff phase of flight, reaching a speed of roughly 500 km/h (300 mph) prior to the rocket motor's depletion. Once all fuel had been exhausted, the rocket motor was intended to slip backwards from its attachment points and drop away from the aircraft. However, testing revealed that this would sometimes fail to detach or cause minor damage to the aircraft's underside when doing so. Despite such difficulties, the F-100's ZELL system was considered to be feasible, but the idea of its deployment had become less attractive as time went on.

Eventually, all projects involving ZELL aircraft were abandoned, largely due to logistical concerns, as well as the increasing efficiency of guided missiles having rendered the adoption of such aircraft to be less critical in the eyes of strategic planners. Furthermore, the desire to field combat aircraft that lacked any dependence upon relatively vulnerable landing strips had motivated the development of several aircraft capable of either vertical takeoff and landing (VTOL) or short takeoff and landing (STOL) flight profiles; such fighters included production aircraft such as British Hawker Siddeley Harrier and the Soviet Yak-38, as well as experimental prototypes such as the American McDonnell Douglas F-15 STOL/MTD.

== ZELMAL (zero-length launch mat landing) ==
The ZELMAL program investigated the possibility of a zero-length landing. The program was conducted 1953 and 1954. It involved a Republic F-84 aircraft and an inflatable rubber mat. The aircraft would perform a zero-length landing by catching an arrester cable with a tailhook, similar to an aircraft carrier landing. The aircraft would then drop onto the rubber mat. A number of unmanned tests were performed before two piloted ZELMAL tests in 1954. In both cases the pilots suffered spinal injuries, and the program was not continued.

== Manned aircraft involved in ZELL testing ==
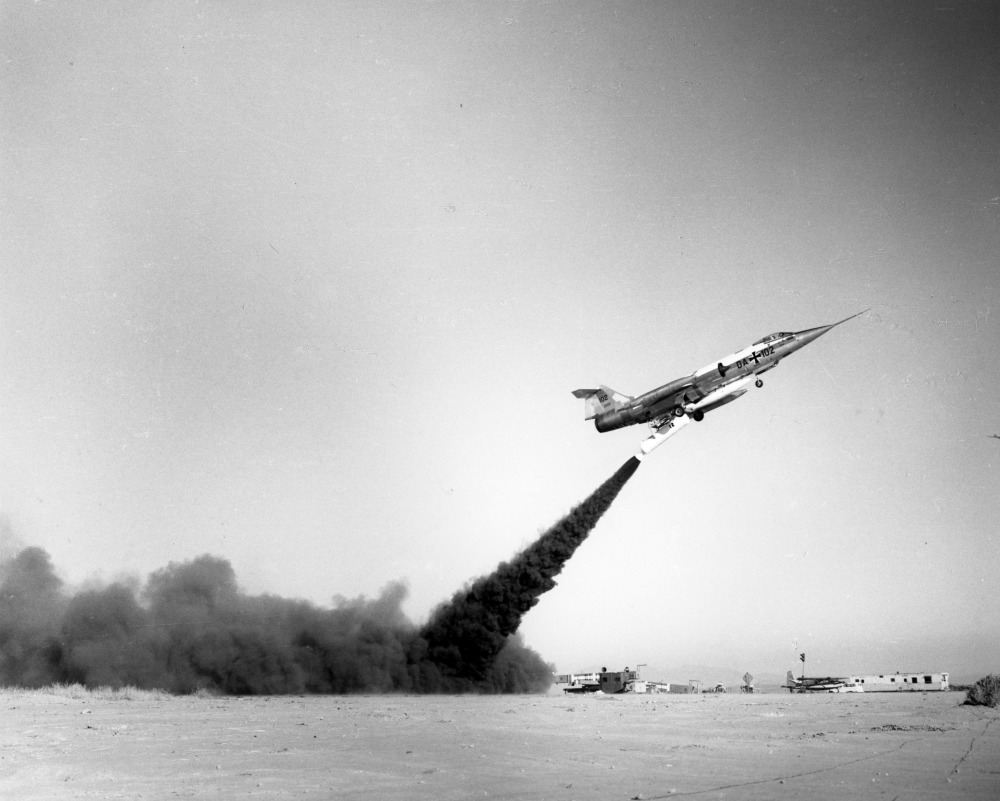
A Lockheed F-104G during tests at Edwards Air Force Base

- Republic F-84G Thunderjet
- North American F-100D Super Sabre
- Lockheed F-104 Starfighter
- Mikoyan-Gurevich MiG-19 SM-30
- Avro Canada CF-105 Arrow

== See also ==
- Index of aviation articles
- Bachem Ba 349—World War II vertical launch rocket interceptor
- JATO
- CAM ship
- VTOL
- Aircraft catapult, a device used to launch aircraft from aircraft carriers
