= Erich Bachem =

German engineer

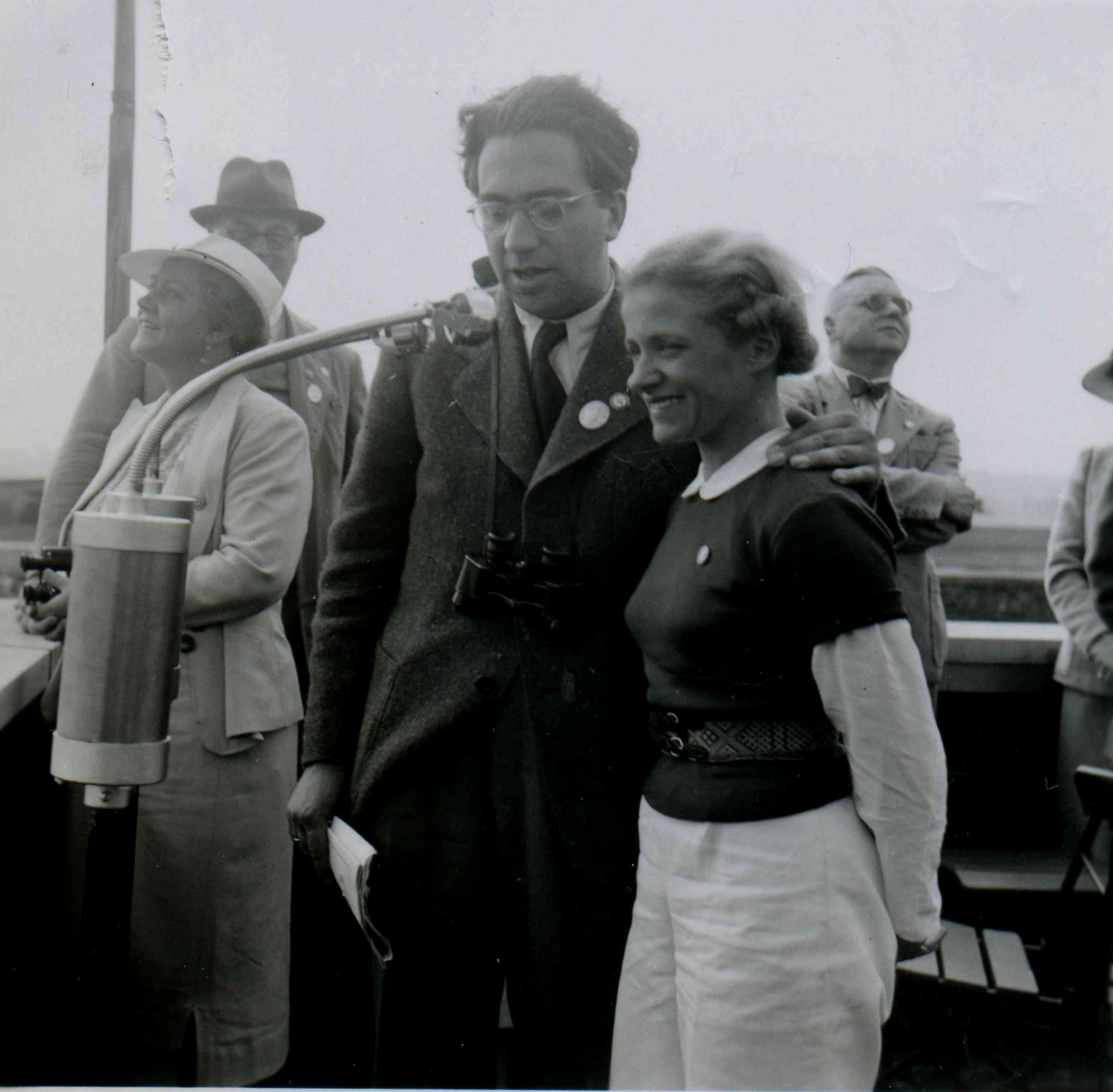
Erich Bachem and Hanna Reitsch in 1938.

Erich Bachem (12 August 1906, in Mülheim an der Ruhr – 25 March 1960) was a German engineer.

In the 1930s Erich Bachem designed the Aero-Sport camping trailer built from plywood by the glider company Wolf Hirth in Kirchheim unter Teck. Until 1942 Bachem served as technical director for the aircraft manufacturer Fieseler. In February 1942 he founded Bachem-Werke GmbH, a supplier of spare parts for the aircraft industry, in Waldsee, Baden-Württemberg.

In 1944, he designed for the SS the vertical take-off manned rocket plane Bachem Ba 349 Natter. The only manned test flight on 1 March 1945 ended with pilot Lothar Sieber being killed.

In 1947/48 Erich Bachem left Germany through Denmark and Sweden in order to settle in Argentina. Possibly he wished to escape US agents who planned to send him to the USA with Wernher von Braun's group as part of Operation Overcast. In Argentina, among other things, he constructed a factory for guitars with interchangeable bottoms.

In 1952 Bachem returned to Germany to become technical director for the company of his father-in-law Heinrich Wilhelm Schwarz, Ruhrthaler Maschinenfabrik Schwarz & Dyckerhoff GmbH, in Mülheim. There he developed the modern streamlined mine locomotive Ruhrthaler Vollsicht along with various other pieces of mining machinery and long-distance diesel locomotives. He occupied this position until his untimely death.

== Eriba caravans ==
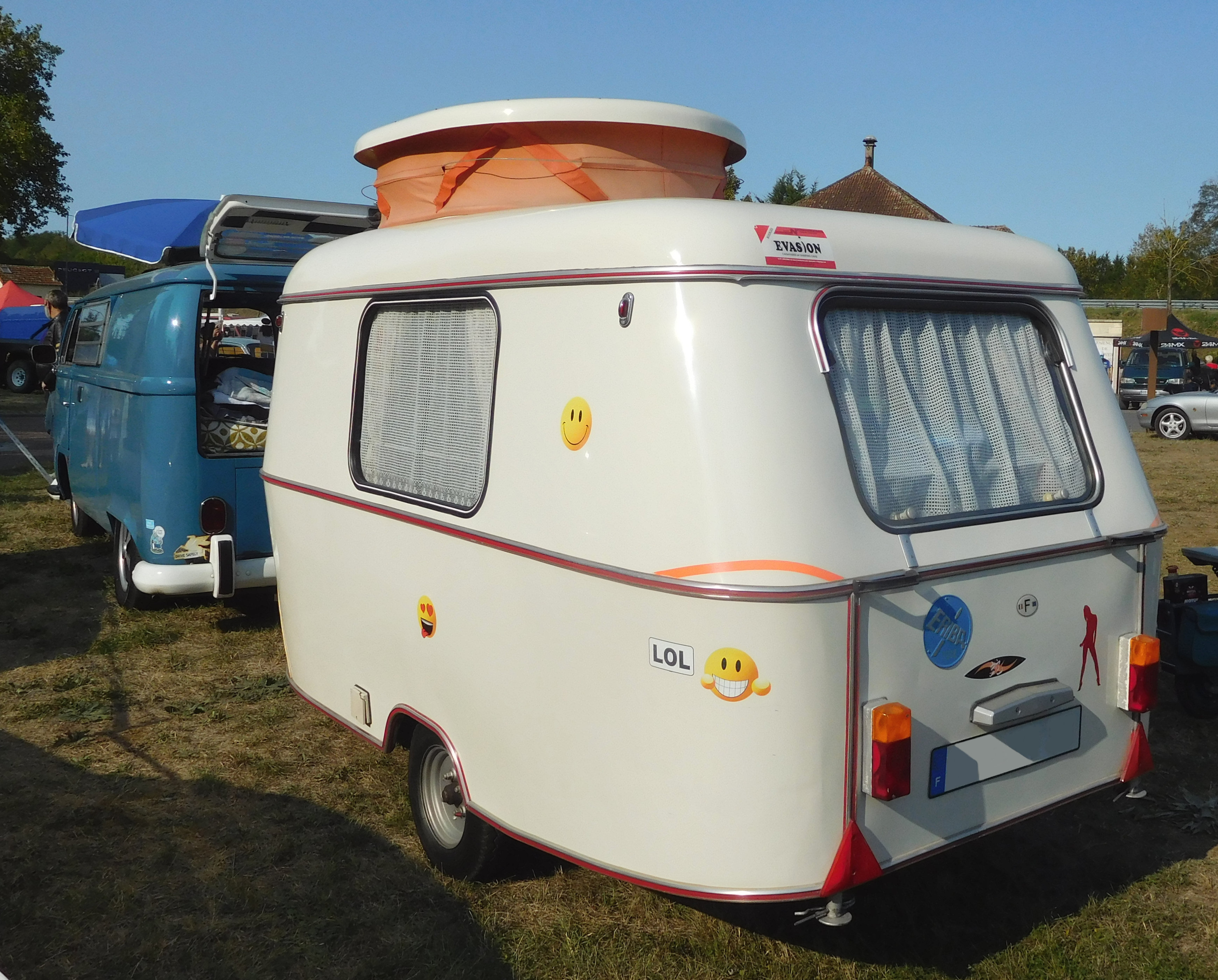
Early Eriba Puck caravan

From 1957, together with Erwin Hymer at Hymer, he designed caravans sold as Eriba (Erich Bachem, or possibly Erika Bachem after his wife) with names like Puck, Pan, Triton, Troll and the very rare, large Titan and Odin models. These were designed for light weight, the smallest Puck being able to be towed by a VW Beetle or NSU Prinz. Despite this light weight, they were unusually well constructed with a steel tube internal frame and an insulated aluminium skin over this, at a time when most caravans were still made of plywood. The basic design continues in production today, over 60 years later, and original caravans are sought after. They are still distinguished by their 'pop top', a section of the fibreglass roof that raises to provide extra headroom, with a canvas cover between. When lowered for towing, this reduces the overall height and wind resistance of the trailer.

== Publications ==
- Die Praxis des Leistungs-Segelfliegens. Berlin: Volckmann 1932, 2. Auflage 1936
- Das Problem des Schnellstfluges. Stuttgart: Franckh 1933
- Beitrag in: Probleme aus der astronautischen Grundlagenforschung, hrsg. v. Heinz H. Koelle, 1952

== Bibliography ==
- Gooden, Brett. Natter: Manned Missile of the Third Reich: Historic Step to Human Spaceflight. Rundle Mall, Australia: Brett Gooden, 2019. ISBN 978-0646-81213-7
- Sharp, Dan (2019). Spitfires Over Berlin. Mortons Media Group. pp. 40–47. ISBN 978-1911658047.
- Nachrufartikel in: Wissenschaftliche Gesellschaft für Luft- und Raumfahrt: Jahrbuch, Jg. 1960, S. 479
- Volker Hammermeister, Die Legende lebt, in: Caravaning, Heft 2/2007, S. 12f (auch online
