= Fausto Cattaneo =

American physicist

Fausto Cattaneo is an Italian physicist, currently at University of Chicago and an Elected Fellow of the American Physical Society.
