= Cattaneo Magni RR =

Italian rocket-powered aircraft

RR
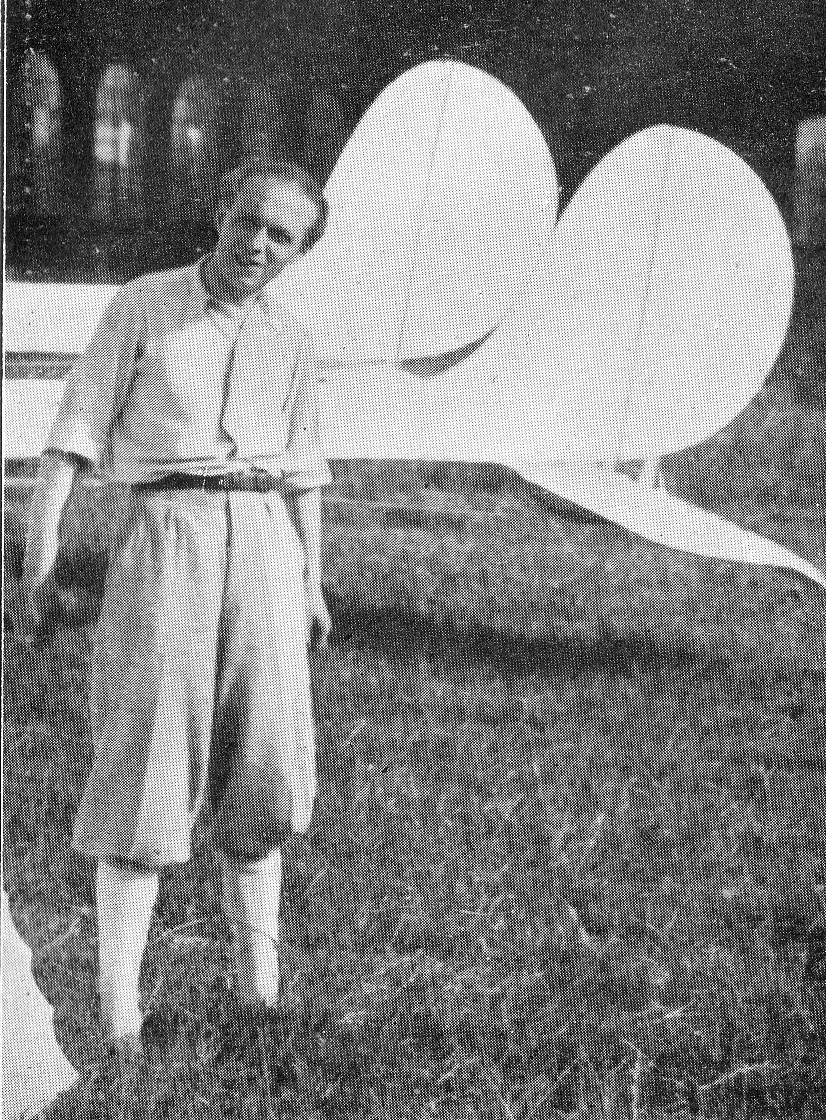
- Ettore Cattaneo standing by the tail of the RR

General information
- Type: Rocket-powered aircraft
- National origin: Italy
- Designer: Ettore Cattaneo
- Built by: Pietro Magni Aviazione
- Number built: 1

History
- First flight: 25 June 1931
- Retired: late 1931
- Developed from: Abate GP.1

The Cattaneo Magni RR was an early rocket-powered aircraft developed and flown in Italy.

== Development and design ==
With the rocket-propelled flights made in Germany in the late 1920s by the Lippisch Ente and the Opel RAK.1, the Italian glider pilot Ettore Cattaneo was inspired to make similar flights. Cattaneo had initially intended to use a liquid-propellant rocket, however while testing the design of one, an accident resulted in him being hospitalized. Cattaneo then decided to focus on using solid fuel rockets and, with help from two Milan Polytechnic staff members, developed ones that used a mixture of gunpowder, chlorine and paraffin.

The aircraft was built using components of the Abate GP.1 glider that Cattaneo had previously used to set Italian and world gliding records with, with the alterations being carried out by Piero Magni Aviazione. The wings and the forward section of the fuselage were retained. The glider was changed to have a twin-boom layout, and the rear of the shortened fuselage was fitted with a circular array of six of Cattaneo's solid fuel rockets, which were intended to be ignited in succession.

RR stood for Radio Razzo (Radio Rocket), as it was also intended to be used as a radio controlled drone.

== Operational history ==
Testing took place at the Taliedo aerodrome, near Milan. The first flight took place on 25 June 1931, with two rockets being fitted. The flight covered 800 m (874.9 yd). Between 25 and 29 June, the RR made a total of six flights, the longest of which covered 1 km (0.6 mi), and the greatest duration being two minutes. All take-offs took place with the use of bungee cords, with the rockets being ignited after launch.

Cattaneo had intended to construct an improved version of rocket aeroplane, weighing 200 kg (440.9 lb), with which he intended to cross the English Channel, however the modest results he achieved at Taliedo curtailed those plans. The RR was placed into storage, and then subsequently demolished.

== Specifications ==
Data from Ali e Uomini

General characteristics

- Crew: 1
- Length: 7.25 m (23 ft 9 in)
- Wingspan: 16.8 m (55 ft 1 in)
- Height: 2.4 m (7 ft 10 in)
- Wing area: 24.64 m^{2} (265.2 sq ft)
- Empty weight: 195 kg (430 lb)
- Max takeoff weight: 300 kg (661 lb)

Performance

== See also ==
Aircraft of comparable role, configuration, and era

- Lippisch Ente
- Opel RAK.1

Related lists

- List of rocket-powered aircraft
