= Bisnovat 5 =

Soviet 1940s experimental supersonic aircraft

General information
- Type: Supersonic research aircraft
- National origin: USSR
- Manufacturer: OKB-253
- Designer: Matus Bisnovat
- Number built: 2

History
- First flight: 14 July 1948

The Bisnovat 5 (Бисноват 5) was a supersonic research aircraft designed in the USSR in the late 1940s, inspired by the German DFS 346 aircraft that was captured by Soviet troops towards the end of World War II.

The aircraft was ordered into development to provide an all-Soviet alternative to an aircraft built with foreign technology. Originally intended to take-off from the ground, gliding flights were carried out from a Petlyakov Pe-8 mothership, similar to the way that the Bell X-1 was dropped from a B-29 Superfortress mothership.

Unpowered flight tests revealed poor stability and dangerous landing characteristics with Aircraft 5-1 (first prototype) being damaged beyond repair after the third gliding flight. Flight tests with Aircraft 5-2, fitted with a 45 degree swept fin of greater aspect ratio to improve directional stability, resumed on 26 January 1949. However, further delays were caused by the pilot landing off the runway causing serious damage.

To improve the landing stability the 5-2 was modified with wing-tip skids, at the end of downturned wing-tips with 45 degrees anhedral, and a single skid on the centreline, as well as a ventral fin at the rear. Flying and landing qualities were much improved, but progress was slow and the Bisnovat 5 was cancelled without the aircraft making a single powered flight and only sixteen gliding flights, between 14 July 1948 and November 1949, during which a maximum speed of Mach 0.775 was attained.

== Specifications ==
Data from Soviet Rocket Fighters

General characteristics

- Crew: 1
- Length: 9.92 m (32 ft 7 in) 5-1

11.2 m (37 ft) 5-2 after modifications

- Wingspan: 6.4 m (21 ft 0 in) 5-1

6.6 m (22 ft) 5-2 with aileron flippers

- Wing area: 11.315 m^{2} (121.79 sq ft)
- Airfoil: root: TsAGI 12045bis; tip: TsAGI P2 (2M)
- Empty weight: 883 kg (1,947 lb)
- Gross weight: 3,184 kg (7,020 lb)
- Powerplant: 1 × Dushkin-Glushko RD-2M3VF twin-chamber liquid-fuelled rocket motor, 19.6 kN (4,410 lbf) thrust above 8,000 m (26,000 ft)

Performance

- Maximum speed: 1,200 km/h (750 mph, 650 kn) design speed
- Landing speed: 153–160 km/h (95–99 mph; 83–86 kn)
- Endurance: 2 minutes at full thrust
