= Bachem Ba 349 Natter =

German rocket-powered interceptor prototype

Ba 349 Natter
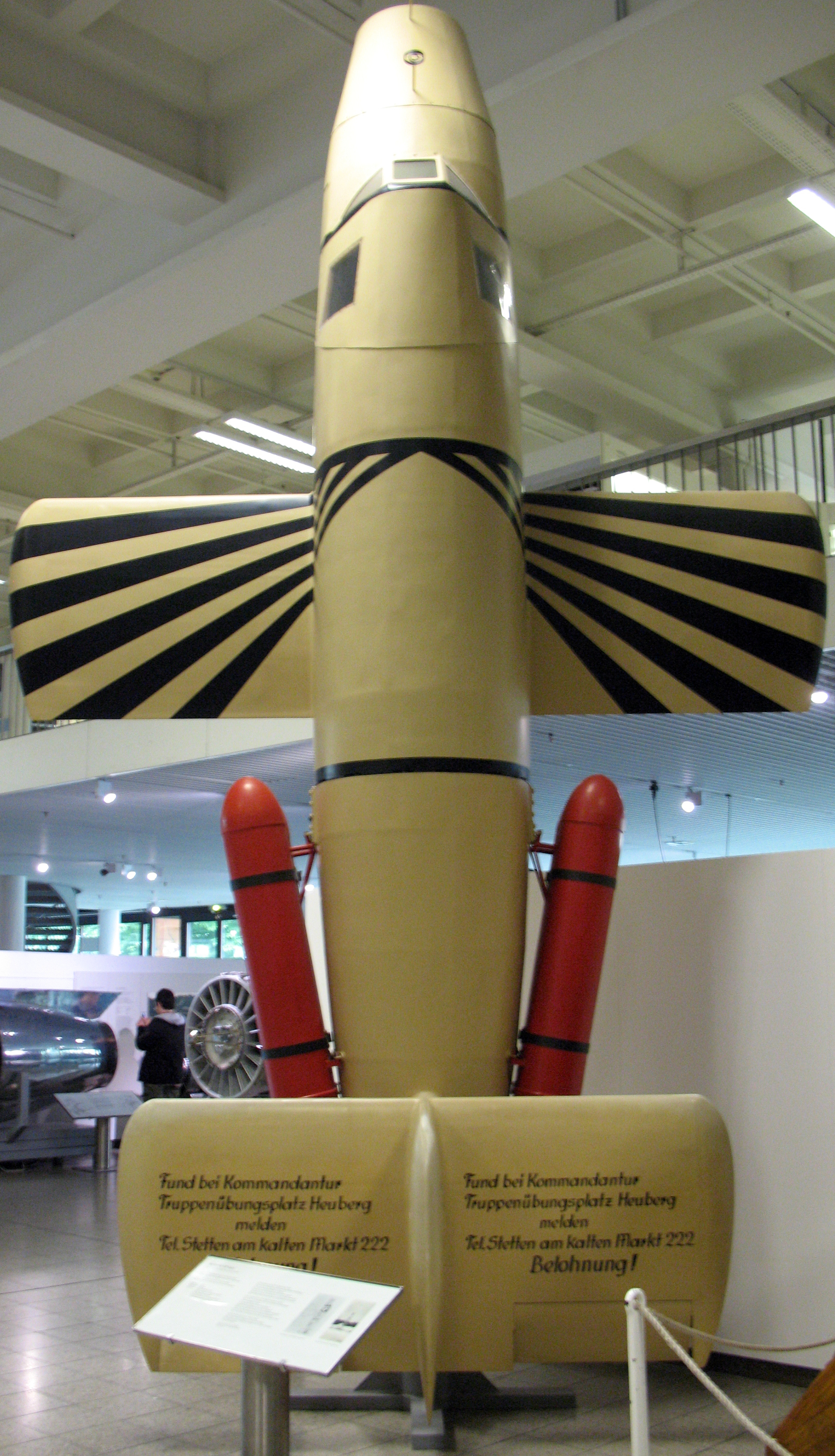
- A replica of the Bachem Ba 349 at the Deutsches Museum in Munich, Germany

General information
- Type: Rocket-powered interceptor
- Manufacturer: Bachem Werke GmbH
- Designer: Erich Bachem
- Primary users: Luftwaffe Schutzstaffel
- Number built: 36

History
- First flight: 1 March 1945

The Bachem Ba 349 Natter (English: Colubrid, grass-snake (Note: Usually mis-translated as "Viper" or "Adder". However, the corresponding German terms (Viper and Otter) always refer to venomous snakes. Natter traditionally denotes a non-venomous snake, especially the common grass-snake of Europe (Natrix natrix). Technically, the literal English translation of Natter would be "colubrid"; no corresponding vernacular term exists in English, since rather than distinguishing "adders" from non-venomous snakes, German developed a venomous and a non-venomous variant of its equivalent of "adder".)) is a German rocket-powered point-defence interceptor that was developed during the latter portion of the Second World War.

The Ba 349 was to be deployed in a very similar way to a manned version of the surface-to-air missiles under development in the Reich. A typical mission profile started with a rapid vertical take-off (the time to altitude being 62 seconds to 12 km (39,000 ft), which eliminated the need for conventional airfields, while the majority of the flight towards Allied bombers was to be controlled by an autopilot, making it feasible to be flown by relatively untrained pilots. The primary role of the pilot was to aim the aircraft at a target bomber and to fire rockets housed in the aircraft's nose cone. After completing their attack run, the pilot would dive their Natter to a lower altitude before, using separate parachutes, the pilot and the fuselage containing the rocket engine would land separately and be recovered. The nose section was disposable, hence the aircraft being classified as being semi-expendible.

The Natter was first conceived of during August 1944 as the BP-20 by Erich Bachem amid a pressing military need to counter the Allied strategic bombing offensive being waged against Nazi Germany. While not designed to fulfil the specification for the Emergency Fighter Program, it was designed for the same purpose. Accordingly, the Natter was designed to be constructed by unskilled labour using low-tech tooling and affordable materials wherever possible, being largely composed of wood. After securing the backing of Reichsführer-SS Heinrich Himmler, the BP-20 was quickly refined into the Ba 349; the first experimental prototype Natter, Versuchsmuster 1 was completed on 4 October 1944. Several prototypes underwent testing in level flight, towed and free gliding, and unmanned vertical flights. The first and only manned vertical take-off flight, conducted on 1 March 1945 near Stetten am kalten Markt, ended in the death of the test pilot, Lothar Sieber, due to a canopy failure. During the one-minute flight, about 14 kilometres (7 1/2 nmi) were travelled in total, at a calculated average speed of about 800 km/h (430 kn). No operational flights were ever conducted; at least one Natter was transported to the US for evaluation after the end of the conflict.

== Development ==
=== Background ===
In 1943, the air superiority of the Luftwaffe was being challenged by Allied aircraft over the Reich; seeking to overcome this crisis, German officials urgently sought out radical innovations and unconventional solutions to respond to the threat posed by Allied airpower. The emerging field of surface-to-air missiles appeared to be a promising approach against the Allied strategic bombing offensive; a variety of projects were started, but invariably problems with the guidance and homing systems prevented any of these from attaining operational status. Providing the missile with a pilot, who could operate a weapon during the brief terminal approach phase, offered a solution.

Submissions for a simple target defence interceptor were requested by the Luftwaffe in early 1944 under the umbrella of the Jägernotprogramm, literally "Emergency Fighter Program". A number of simple designs were proposed, including the Heinkel P.1077 Julia, in which the pilot lay prone (on his stomach), to reduce the frontal area. Following a series of evaluations by the Reichsluftfahrtministerium (RLM, Ministry of Aviation), the Julia would become the front-runner to fulfil this requirement in autumn 1944. The initial plan was to launch the aircraft vertically, but this concept was later changed to a conventional horizontal take-off from a tricycle-wheeled trolley, similar to that used by the first eight prototypes of the Arado Ar 234 Blitz jet reconnaissance bomber.

=== Bachem's proposal ===
The Natter was first conceived by the aeronautical engineer Erich Bachem in August 1944, after witnessing an American bombing raid on a major German city. He believed there ought to be a way to break up these large formations of bombers. His BP-20 ("Natter") was a development from a design he had worked on at Fieseler, the Fi 166 concept, but considerably more radical than the other submissions. It was built using glued and nailed wooden parts with an armour-plated bulkhead and bulletproof glass windshield at the front of the cockpit. The initial plan was to power the aircraft with a Walter HWK 109-509A-2 rocket engine; however, only the 109-509A-1, as used in the Me 163, was available. It had a sea level thrust variable between 100 kg (220 lb) at "idle" to 1,600 kg (3,500 lb) at full power, with the Natter's intended quartet of rear flank-mount Schmidding SG34 solid fuel rocket boosters used in its vertical launch to provide an additional 4,800 kg (10,600 lb) thrust for ten seconds before they burned out and were jettisoned. The experimental prototypes slid up a 20 m (66 ft)-tall vertical steel launch tower for a maximum sliding length of 17 m (56 ft) in three guideways, one for each wing tip and one for the lower tip of the ventral tail fin. By the time the aircraft left the tower it was hoped that it would have achieved sufficient speed to allow its aerodynamic surfaces to provide stable flight.

Under operational conditions, once the Natter had left the launcher, it would be guided to the proximity of the Allied bombers by an autopilot with the possibility of an added beam guidance similar to that used in some V-2 rocket launches. Only then would the pilot take control, aim and fire the armament, which was originally proposed to be a salvo of nineteen 55 mm (2.2 in) R4M rockets. Later, 28 R4Ms or a number of the larger, 73 mm (2.9 in) Henschel Hs 297 Föhn rockets were suggested, with either variety of unguided rocket fired from the Natter's nose-mounted cellular launch tubes. The Natter was intended to fly up and over the bombers, by which time its Walter engine would probably be out of propellant. Following its one-time attack with its rockets, the pilot would dive his Natter, now effectively a glider, to an altitude of around 3,000 m (10,000 ft), flatten out, release the nose of the aircraft and a small braking parachute from the rear fuselage. The fuselage would decelerate and the pilot would be ejected forwards by his own momentum and land by means of a personal parachute.

In an early proposal in August 1944, the Natter design featured a concrete nose; it was suggested that the aircraft might ram enemy bombers, but this proposal was subsequently withdrawn in later Project Natter outlines. Bachem stated clearly in the initial proposal that the Natter was not a suicide weapon and much effort went into designing safety features for the pilot. However, owing to the potential dangers for the pilot inherent in the operation of this precarious aircraft, the Natter has sometimes been listed as a suicide craft. The design had one decisive advantage over its competitors – it eliminated the necessity to land an unpowered glider at an airbase, which, as the history of the Me 163 rocket interceptor had clearly demonstrated, left an aircraft extremely vulnerable to attack by Allied fighters.

=== Modifications ===
Bachem approached Adolf Galland, a Luftwaffe general and flying ace, after which Galland personally recommended its development to the RLM. The RLM's technical department allegedly took a poor view of this approach, viewing it as unorthodox and meddlesome. Furthermore, the semi-expendable nature of the Natter meant that it did not conform with the existing specification issued for the Emergency Fighter Program. Bachem refused to be discouraged and sought out other politically-influential figures to support the Natter concept. He was granted an interview with Heinrich Himmler, the Reichsführer-SS, who quickly gave his full support to the Natter. Within 24 hours, Bachem was informed that the RLM's technical department was reconsidering their rejection and that the project had received the highest development priority. Accordingly, in mid-September 1944, the Technical Office of the Waffen-SS issued an order for Bachem to develop and manufacture the Natter at his Waldsee factory. The RLM officially designated the BP-20 as the Ba 349A and construction began.

During December 1944, the project came largely under the control of the SS and Obergruppenführer Hans Kammler. This decision has been claimed to have been the only occasion that the SS would significantly interfere with aircraft design and air fighting strategy. At an early stage if the project, the RLM undertook an engineering assessment of the Natter, the report for which was issued on 28 October 1944. The Natter was designed to be built by unskilled labour with poor-quality tools and inexpensive material. Various stringent economies were imposed on an already frugal design. The airframe of the Natter was almost entirely composed of wood. It also lacked landing gear, which saved weight, expense and construction time. Consequently, one of the most unusual features of the machine was the escape of the pilot and recovery of the machine.

The proposed sequence of these events was as follows: After the attack, the Natter might dive to a lower altitude and flatten out into level flight. The pilot would then proceed with a well-practised escape sequence. He would open the cockpit canopy latch, which would allow the canopy to flick backwards on its hinge in the airstream. Next, the pilot would undo his seat belt and remove his feet from the rudder pedal stirrups. By squeezing a lever mounted on the control column, he would release a lock at the base of the column, which would allow him to tilt the column forwards where it could engage in and undo a safety latch for the nose release mechanism. He would then lean a little further forward and pull a lever hinged near the floor at the front of the cockpit, freeing the nose section, which self-jettisoned as a result of the reduced aerodynamic pressure at the front of the fuselage. As the nose section separated, it was intended to briefly pull on two cables that released a small ribbon parachute stored on the starboard side of the rear fuselage. The parachute subsequently opened and decelerated the Natter. The pilot would be ejected from the cockpit by his own momentum and as soon as he was clear of the fuselage, he would open his personal parachute and descend to the ground. A parachute was intended to eject the valuable Walter rocket engine from the rear, which would decelerate the aircraft and eject the pilot with inertia, however, associated problems with this mechanism were still not fully resolved prior to the conflict's end.

Wind tunnel testing on a wooden model, scaled to 40% of full size, was performed at the Deutsche Versuchsanstalt für Luftfahrt (DVL), the Institute for Aerodynamics at Berlin-Adlershof in September 1944 at speeds up to 504 kilometres per hour (313 mph). Results from these tests were reported in January 1945 to the Bachem-Werk. Further model tests were carried out at the Luftfahrtforschungsanstalt Hermann Göring (LFA) facility in Völkenrode-Braunschweig, at speeds close to Mach 1. In March 1945, the Bachem-Werk simply received a statement that satisfactory flying qualities should be expected with speeds up to 1,100 kilometres per hour (680 mph).

=== Flight testing ===
Construction of the first experimental prototype Natter, Versuchsmuster 1, was completed on 4 October 1944. V1 was subsequently referred to as Baumuster1 (BM1) and later still the "B" was dropped and the machine became known as the M1. Most subsequent prototypes were known by 'M' codes, as the later prototypes of the Heinkel He 162 were. Manned glider flights began on 3 November 1944. The first glider M1 was towed to around 3,000 m by a Heinkel He 111 bomber with a cable (Tragschlepp mode) at Neuburg an der Donau. After flying at speeds of up to 425 mph (684 km/h), the pilot successfully bailed out as planned.

Amongst the findings reported by the recovered pilot was that the Natter possessed excellent stability and effective controls. However, it was also found that the towing cable, and in the case of the M3, the undercarriage interfered with the flight characteristics of the gliders and consequently the results were difficult to interpret. To resolve doubts about the Natter in the glider mode, Hans Zübert made a free flight in the M8 on 14 February, and showed that the Natter was indeed a good flying machine.

The vertical take-off trials were conducted on high ground called the Ochsenkopf at the Truppenübungsplatz (military training area) Heuberg near Stetten am kalten Markt, Württemberg. The first successful unmanned vertical take-off from the experimental launch tower occurred on 22 December 1944. The test machine, the M16, was powered only by the Schmidding solid boosters, as were all the early vertical launch trials. The performance of these solid boosters proved to be erratic, both in terms of thrust output and burn time, while numerous units unintentionally exploded. Up to and including 1 March 1945, 16 prototypes had been used, 8 in glider trials and 8 in VTO trials.

By January 1945, Himmler's enthusiasm for the Natter had waned while numerous officials had been advocating for the concentration of resources on the turbojet-powered Messerschmitt Me 262 and rocket-powered Messerschmitt Me 263 interceptors at the expense of less mature competing projects such as the Natter. Furthermore, some figures within the RLM urged for rapid progress to be made on the project, thus Bachem came under considerable political pressure to carry out a manned flight by the end of February. Furthermore, the Natter's operational evaluation was scheduled to take place in April.

On 25 February, M22 was in the experimental launch tower. It was as complete an operational aircraft as possible with the Walter HWK 109-509 A1 engine installed for the first time and a dummy pilot present in the cockpit. Lift-off from the tower was perfect. The engineers and ground crew watched as the M22 ascended under the combined power of the four Schmidding boosters and the Walter engine, an estimated total thrust of 6,500 kg (14,300 lb). The nose separated as programmed and the dummy pilot descended safely under its personal parachute. The remainder of the fuselage came down under its two large salvage parachutes, but when it hit the ground the Walter liquid-propellant rocket engine's residual hypergolic propellants (T-Stoff oxidizer and C-Stoff fuel) exploded and the aircraft was destroyed.

=== Manned test flight ===
Despite Bachem's concerns that the test programme had been significantly cut short, a young volunteer Luftwaffe test pilot, Lothar Sieber, climbed into the cockpit of the fully fuelled M23 on 1 March. The aircraft was equipped with an FM transmitter for the purpose of transmitting flight data from various monitoring sensors in the aircraft. A hard wire intercom appears to have been provided between Sieber and the engineers in the launch bunker using a system similar to that used in the manned glider flights. Around 11:00 am, the M23 was ready for take-off. Initially, the Natter rose vertically but, at an altitude of about 100 to 150 m (330 to 490 ft), it suddenly pitched up into an inverted curve at about 30° to the vertical. At about 500 m (1,600 ft) the cockpit canopy was seen to fly off. The Natter continued to climb at high speed at an angle of 15° from the horizontal and disappeared into the clouds. The Walter engine stalled about 15 seconds after take-off. It is estimated the Natter reached 1,500 m (4,900 ft), at which point it nose-dived and hit the ground with great force about 32 seconds later, some kilometres from the launch site. Unknown at the time, one of the Schmidding boosters failed to jettison and its remains were dug up at the crash site in 1998.

The pilot was likely unconscious long before the crash. Bachem surmised Sieber had involuntarily pulled back on the control column under the effect of the 3 G acceleration. Examination of the canopy, which fell near the launch site, showed the tip of the latch was bent, suggesting it may not have been in the fully closed position at launch. The pilot's headrest had been attached to the underside of the canopy and as the canopy flew off the pilot's head would have snapped back suddenly about 25 cm (9.8 in), hitting the solid wooden rear upper cockpit bulkhead, and either knocking Sieber unconscious or breaking his neck.

The accident reinforced Bachem's long held belief that the take-off and flight in the vicinity of the target bombers should be fully automated. The canopy latch was strengthened and the headrest was attached to the backboard of the cockpit. Before the introduction of the autopilot in the test programme, the control column would have a temporary locking device on it, which would allow the aircraft to ascend vertically to at least 1,000 m (3,300 ft) and then be removed by the pilot. The Walter engine probably ceased operation because the Natter was virtually upside-down and air may have entered the intake pipes in the propellant tanks, starving the engine. Sieber had become the first person to take off vertically from the ground under pure rocket power, 16 years before Yuri Gagarin's Vostok 1, pioneering peacetime orbital flight. Following Sieber's death, all of the eight subsequent Natter flights were unmanned.

=== Production ===
The SS ordered 150 Natters, and the Luftwaffe ordered 50, but none were delivered by the end of the war. Much debate has surrounded the number of Natters built at the Bachem-Werk and their disposition. According to Bachem, 36 Natters were produced at the Bachem-Werk in Waldsee by the end of the conflict. Up to April 1945, 17 aircraft had been used in unmanned trials comprising five gliders, all slung under an He 111 in the Mistelschlepp configuration prior to launch, and 12 VTO examples. Five aircraft were prepared for manned trials, four gliders and one VTO version. The M3 was flown twice, and then rebuilt at which time it was given the new code BM3a but was never flown. The total number of launches to early April 1945 was 22, as was the total number of Natters constructed up to that time. Bachem reported further that there were 14 more finished or almost finished aircraft in April 1945. Four of these were prototype A1 operational Natters built for test launching from a wooden pole launcher, which had been designed for field deployment. This new launcher was also constructed on the Heuberg, not far from the experimental steel tower. There is documentary evidence for two pole launches in April but not three as claimed by Bachem in his post-war presentation. The documentation for this third flight may have been destroyed by the SS at the war's end. Ten A1 operational Natters, called K-Maschinen, were constructed for the Krokus-Einsatz ("Operation Crocus").

The fate of these 14 A1 Natters was as follows: Three were fired from the vertical launch tower according to Bachem, four were burnt at Waldsee, two were burnt at Lager Schlatt, Oetztal, Austria, four were captured by US troops at Sankt Leonhard im Pitztal, Austria, and one, which had been sent as a sample model to a new factory in Thuringia, was captured by the Red Army. Consequently, the total of 36 test and operational aircraft constructed at the Bachem-Werk can be accounted for. However, Natter carcasses were used for a variety of ground-based purposes; for example, as a static booster rocket, armament and strength testing and pilot seat position tests. Some fuselages were reused after flight testing; for example, the M5, 6 and 7.

Of the four Natters captured at Sankt Leonhard im Pitztal, two went to the United States. Only one original Natter built in Germany in the Second World War survives in storage at the Paul E. Garber Preservation, Restoration, and Storage Facility in Suitland, Maryland, under the auspices of the Smithsonian Institution. The fate of the other Natter brought to the US is unknown. There is no documentary evidence that a Natter was ever flown from Muroc Field. The tail section of one of the Natters at Sankt Leonhard im Pitztal was broken off while it still rested on its trailer.

== Stability ==
In early February 1945, the positions of the centre of gravity for the A1 operational machine during its flight profile were giving the RLM and the SS cause for concern. They wanted these figures to be decided upon for the upcoming construction of the A1 aircraft for Krokus-Einsatz (Operation Crocus), the field deployment of the Natter. The position of the centre of gravity is expressed as a percentage of the chord (distance between the leading and trailing edges) of the main wing. Thus 0% is the leading edge and 100% is the trailing edge. In the manned glider trials the centre of gravity had been varied between 20 and 34%.

At a meeting of engineers held on 8 February, the variations in the centre of gravity expected in the A1 Krokus machine were discussed. At take-off with the weight of the four solid boosters, the centre of gravity would be brought back to 65%, but after releasing these rockets it would move forwards to 22%. The free flight by Zübert on 14 February had shown unequivocally that the little Natter had excellent flying characteristics as a glider. The centre of gravity problem was solved initially by the addition of one-metre-square auxiliary tailfins that were released simultaneously with the jettisoning of the boosters. The Krokus aircraft had vanes that would direct the Walter rocket exhaust gases so as to assist vehicle stabilisation at low speed similar to those used in the V-2 rocket.

== Legacy ==
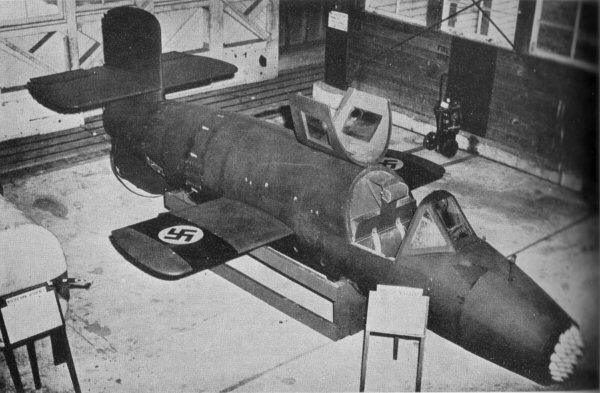
A captured Ba 349A-1 Natter on display for Open Days at Freeman Field, Indiana, September 1945. The swastikas are neither authentic nor positioned according to German military specifications.

By 25 April 1945, French forces had captured Waldsee and presumably took control of the Bachem-Werk. Shortly before the French troops arrived, a group of Bachem-Werk personnel set out for Austria with five A1 Natters on trailers. At Bad Wörishofen, the group waited for another squad retreating from Nabern unter Teck with one completed Natter. Both groups then set out for the Austrian Alps. One group with two Natters ended up at the junction of the river Inn and one of its tributaries, the Ötztaler Ache, at Camp Schlatt. The other group went to St. Leonhard im Pitztal with four aircraft. US troops captured the first group at Camp Schlatt around 4 May and the second group on the following day.

At some time during the project, the Bachem-Werk was ordered to give complete details of the BP-20 Natter to the Japanese, but there was doubt over whether they had received them. They were, however, known to have a general knowledge of the Natter and showed considerable interest in the project.

== Operation Krokus launch pads at Hasenholz wood ==
An operational launch site for the first Ba 349A-1 operational Natters under the code name Operation Krokus was being established in a small wooded area called Hasenholz, south of the Stuttgart to Munich autobahn (present day A8) and to the east of Nabern unter Teck. Around the end of February and the beginning of March the Organisation Todt was in action, constructing each set of the trios of concrete foundations (or "footings") for the launch towers. These three launch pads and their towers were arranged at the corners of an equilateral triangle, 120 m per side. The specific locations are said to be 48°37′42.017″N 9°29′53.607″E, 48°37′42.043″N 9°29′57.860″E and 48°37′38.629″N 9°29′55.140″E. In the centre of each of the three concrete footings is a square hole approximately 50 centimeters deep, which once served as the foundation for the launch tower. Beside each hole is a pipe, cut off at ground level, which was probably once a cable pit. These three concrete pads were noticed by a surveyor in the autumn of 1945, but not rediscovered until 1999.

On 27 January, eight pilots volunteered for the first operational flights and started familiarizing themselves with the Natter at Bachem's factory on 5 February. This training continued until the beginning of April. The pilots were expecting to fly three combat-ready Natters on 20 April, which was Hitler's birthday, but were unaware that the launch pads were still incomplete. But on that day the US 10th Armored Division drove its tanks into Kirchheim unter Teck to the northwest of Hasenholz wood. The next day it crossed the autobahn and headed straight for the Natter operational area. The Natter group subsequently retreated to Waldsee.

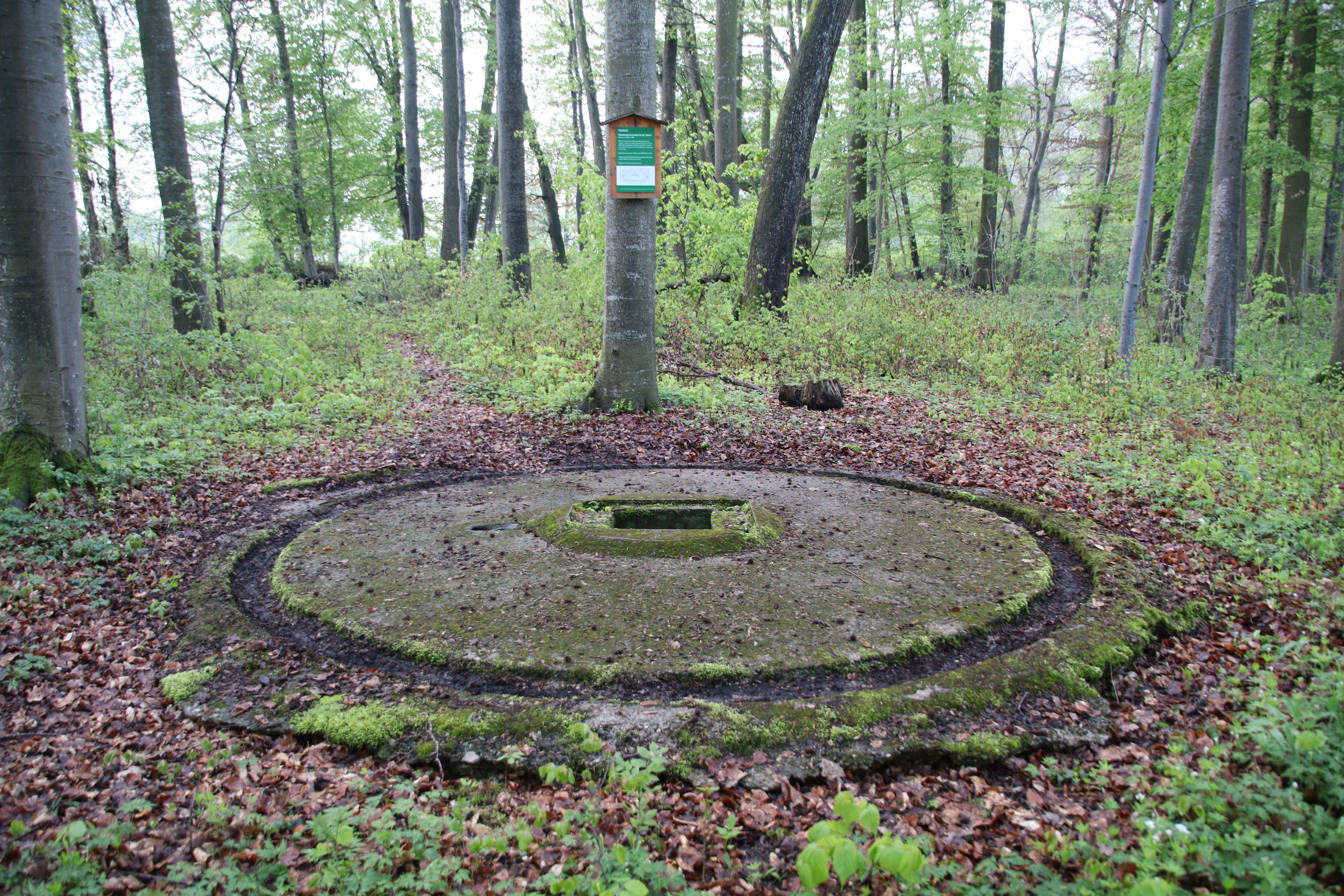
Last preserved Bachem Ba 349 Natter launch pad in the Hasenholz.

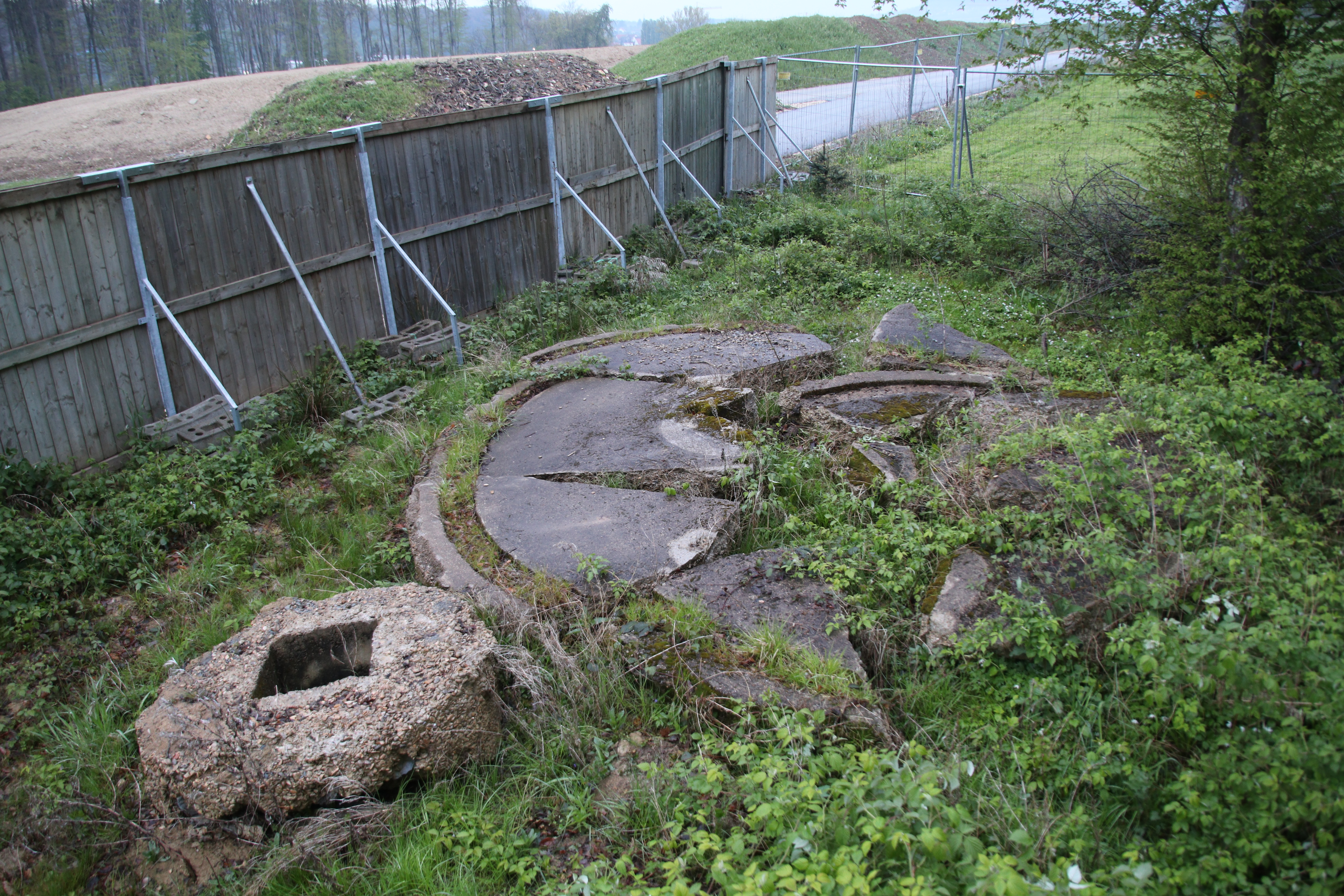
Ruins of the two Bachem Ba 349 Natter launch pads in the Hasenholz.

== Surviving aircraft and replicas ==
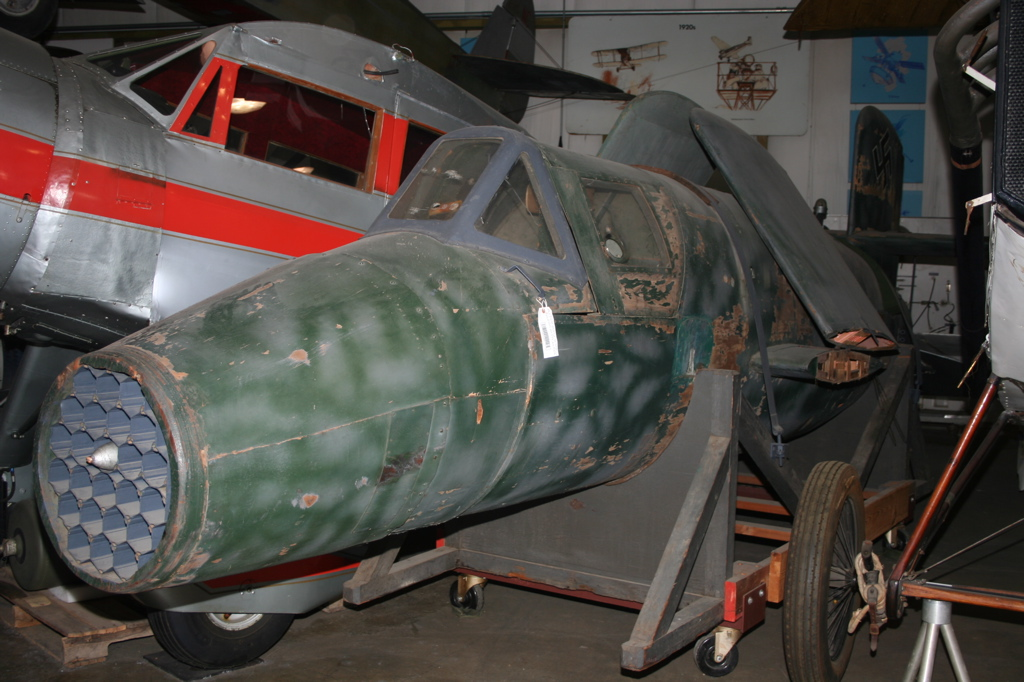
The surviving Bachem Ba 349A-1 at the Smithsonian Institution's Paul E. Garber Preservation, Restoration, and Storage Facility in Suitland, Maryland

Only one original A1 Natter survives; it is stored in the Paul E. Garber Preservation, Restoration and Storage Facility in Suitland, Maryland, US. It is in a poor state of repair and is no longer accessible to the general public. The evidence supports the proposition that this machine was captured by US troops at St. Leonhard im Pitztal, Austria in May 1945.

The Natter displayed at the Deutsches Museum is said to have been reconstructed partly from sub-assemblies that survived the end of the war. This machine is of the experimental type as launched from the steel tower and is painted to look like an M17. There are several static reproductions of Natters around the world, for example at the Planes of Fame Air Museum, Chino, California and Fantasy of Flight, Polk City, Florida, US.

== Film ==
In 2010, Oliver Gortat and Philip Schneider made a documentary film about the Bachem Ba 349.

== Specifications (Ba 349B-1) ==
Ba 349

Data from Aircraft of the Third Reich

General characteristics

- Crew: 1
- Length: 6 m (19 ft 8 in)
- Wingspan: 4 m (13 ft 1 in)
- Height: 2.25 m (7 ft 5 in) (without fins)
- Wing area: 4.7 m^{2} (51 sq ft)
- Empty weight: 880 kg (1,940 lb) fuel expended
- Gross weight: 2,232 kg (4,921 lb)
- Gross weight boosters jettisoned: 1,769 kg (3,900 lb)
- Fuel capacity: 650 kg
- Powerplant: 1 × Walter HWK 109-509C-1 bi-fuel rocket engine, 11.2 kN (2,500 lbf) thrust Hauptofen main chamber

2.9 kN (650 lbf) Marschofen auxiliary chamber

- Powerplant: 4 × Schmidding SG 34 solid fuel booster rockets, 4.9 kN (1,100 lbf) thrust each

or 2 x 9.8 kN (2,200 lbf) solid fuel booster rocket motors

Performance

- Maximum speed: 1,000 km/h (620 mph, 540 kn) at 5,000 m (16,000 ft)
- Cruise speed: 800 km/h (500 mph, 430 kn)
- Range: 60 km (37 mi, 32 nmi) after climb at 3,000 m (9,800 ft)

55 km (34 mi)after climb at 6,000 m (20,000 ft)
42 km (26 mi)after climb at 9,000 m (30,000 ft)
40 km (25 mi)after climb at 10,000 m (33,000 ft)

- Endurance: 4.36 minutes at 6,000 m (20,000 ft)

3.15 minutes at 9,000 m (30,000 ft)

- Service ceiling: 12,000 m (39,000 ft)
- Rate of climb: 190 m/s (37,000 ft/min)
- Time to altitude: 62 s to 12 km (39,000 ft)

Armament

- 24 × 73 mm (2.874 in) Henschel Hs 297 Föhn 73mm rocket shells
- or 33 × 55 mm (2.165 in) R4M rocket shells
- or 2 × 30 mm (1.181 in) MK 108 cannon with 30 rpg (proposed)

== See also ==
- Wasserfall

Related development

- Zero-length launch

Aircraft of comparable role, configuration, and era

- Von Braun Interceptor
- Messerschmitt Me 163 Komet
- Mizuno Shinryu
- Škoda-Kauba Sk P.14

Related lists

- List of aircraft of World War II
- List of World War II military aircraft of Germany
