= Junkers EF 127 =

German rocket fighter project

The Junkers EF 127 was a rocket powered fighter aircraft designed by the Third Reich as a part of the Emergency Fighter Program in the closing year of World War II. The project was codenamed "Walli". The EF 127 was a heavily redesigned version of the Junkers EF 126. The propulsion for the aircraft was a liquid-propellant rocket designed by the Walter company.
