= ITS-8 =

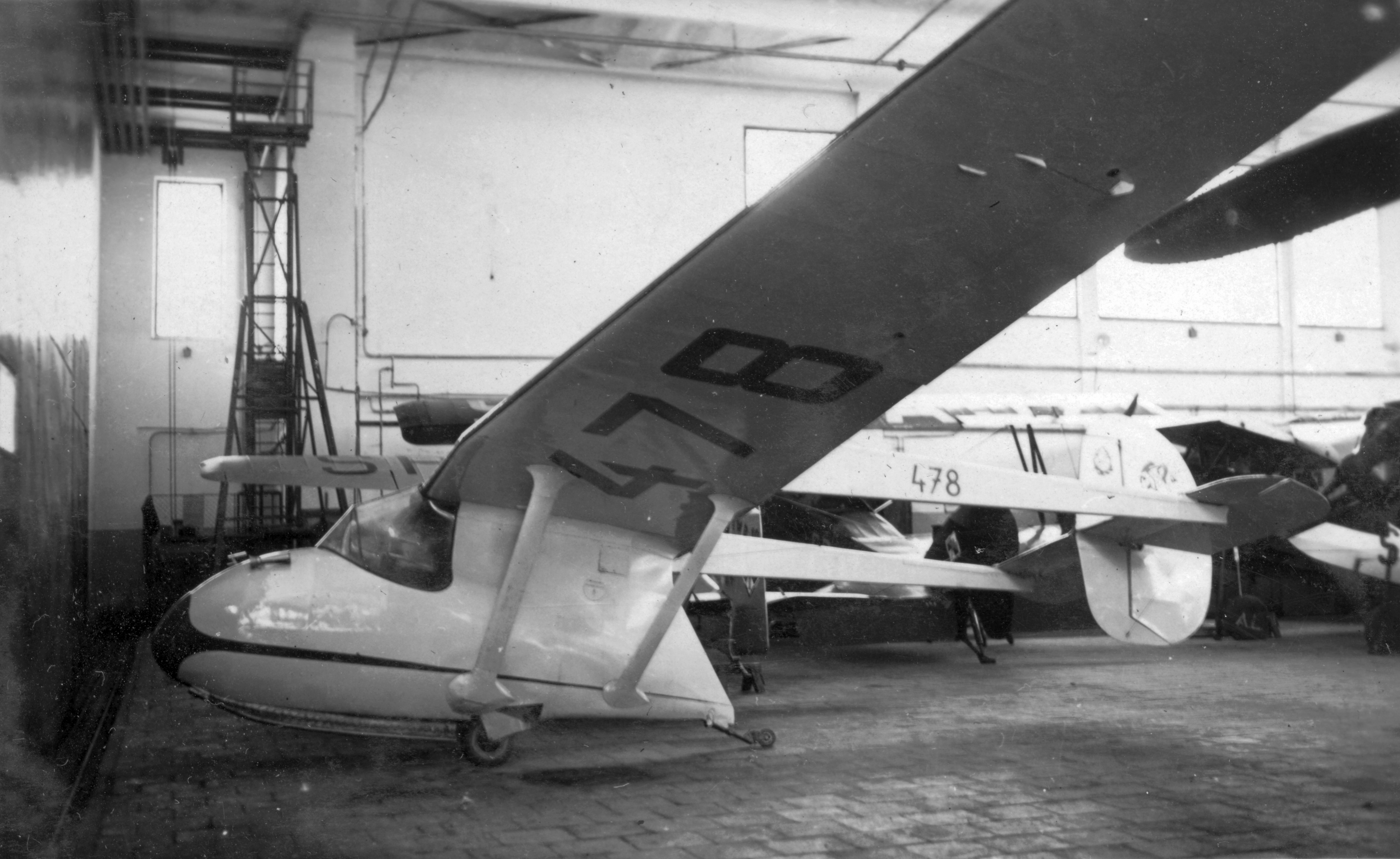

General information
- Type: Motor-glider
- National origin: Poland
- Manufacturer: Institute of gliding techniques (I.T.S.), University of Lwów
- Designer: Wieslaw Stępniewski
- Number built: 2

History
- First flight: late August 1936

The ITS-8 was a Polish twin-boom motor glider flown in 1936. Two prototypes were completed but production was prevented by the German invasion of Poland in 1939.

== Design and development ==
In the mid-1930s there was growing Polish interest in low cost powered gliders and other small, low powered, structurally simple aircraft. The Institute of Gliding Techniques at Lwów University studied motor gliders, guided by FAI specifications for the new International Powered Glider Class. They concluded that a conventional glider nose and forward fuselage was required, hence a pusher engine and, to avoid the drag of a pylon engine mounting, a twin-boom layout. The ITS-8, designed to have a gliding performance competitive with contemporary intermediate and high performance unpowered machines, followed these specifications. Its construction was funded by the LOPP

The wooden ITS-8 had a high wing which was built around a single box spar which with a plywood-covered leading edge formed a torsion box. An auxiliary spar carried differential ailerons. In plan the outer wings had swept leading edges and unswept trailing edges. The rectangular centre section, which was braced on each side with a pair of parallel steel tube struts from the lower fuselage, was ply-covered overall but the outer wing panels were fabric covered behind the torsion box. Two versions of the aircraft had been planned from the start: the low-powered ITS-8, with a 13.6 m (44 ft 7 in) span and an aspect ratio of 10.1 and the higher-powered ITS-8W with longer outer panels, giving it a 14.2 m (46 ft 7 in) span and an aspect ratio of 12.5. The ITS-8W also had a centre section with a higher speed aerofoil, though both used the same aerofoil for their outer panels. These differences reflected the initial intention to use the ITS-8 as a trainer and the ITS-8W in competitive events.

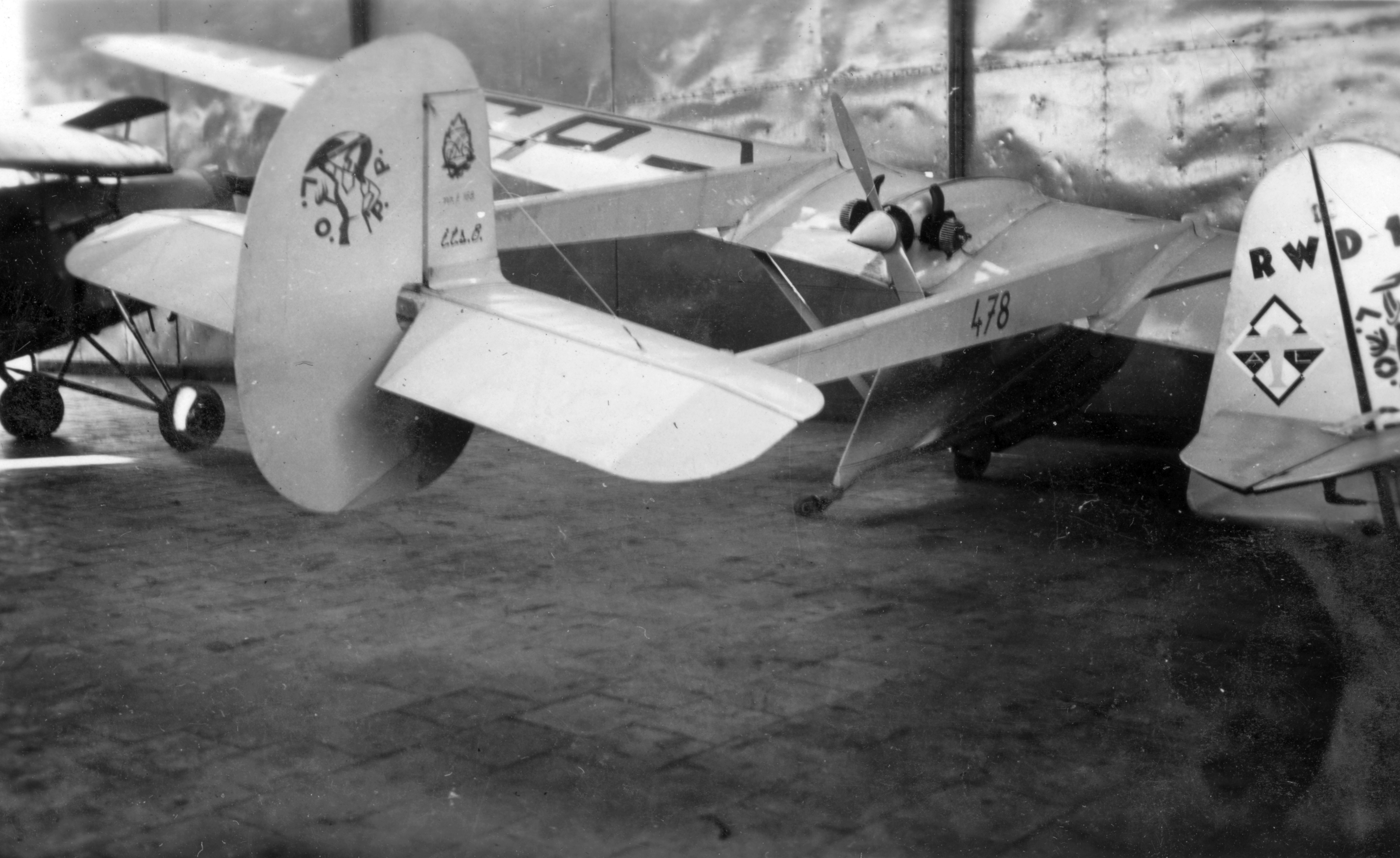
ITS-8 rear three-quarter view

The ITS-8's pilot sat under the wing leading edge in an enclosed cockpit within a drop-shaped, ply-skinned nacelle, its pointed end just aft of the trailing edge. A thin, faired structure connected the nacelle to the centre of the wing, bracing it and the engine, largely buried in the wing apart from a carefully faired air intake at mid-chord and cylinder heads exposed for cooling. The ITS-8 had a 13 kW (18 hp) Kroeber M3 Köller flat twin engine and the ITS-8W initially used another flat-twin, the 17–27 kW (23–36 hp) Schliha as a stop-gap, later replaced by the intended 22–24 kW (30–32 hp) Sarolea Albatros flat-twin. The empennage was mounted on twin rectangular section spruce box girder booms which were internally wire-braced. A tapered tailplane with rounded tips was positioned on the top of the beams. The ITS-8 had a narrow fin mounted centrally on the tailplane, carrying a large balanced rudder but on the ITS-8W this was replaced with twin fins and rudders on the booms.

The nacelle had a sprung landing skid, a semi-retractable monowheel under the wing and a long leaf spring tailwheel. On the ITS-8W the latter was faired-in and ended with a tailwheel.

The ITS-8 was first flown as a glider, towed by a car and piloted by Wieslaw Stępniewski, in late August 1936. Powered flights, piloted by Zbigniew Zabski, began in October and revealed engine vibrations severe enough to damage its mountings. The problem was solved with new mountings on rubber dampers. For a while a 25–28 hp (19–21 kW) Ava 4, an air-cooled flat four engine, was trialed but rejected as unreliable. The test flight programme included soaring flights and airborne engine restarts.

Construction of the ITS-8W began at the same time as that of the ITS-8. It was originally intended to be identical to it apart from the more powerful engine and its use of the longer, interchangeable, outer wing panels. The delay caused by the engine vibration problems of the ITS-8 provided an opportunity to incorporate the aerodynamic advantages provided by the revised centre section and twin-finned empennage before the first flight on 18 May 1938. Planned preparation for production of the ITS-8W in 1939 was ended by the German invasion of Poland.

The invasion also prevented the completion of the ITS-8M, powered by a 35 hp (26 kW) Sarolea, which was to have had a fully cantilever wing fitted with flaps and a fully retractable, twin wheel undercarriage. It was intended for meteorological research.

According to Cynk, the designation ITS-8R referred to a proposed record breaking version which did not reach the detailed design stage. However, the same designation has been associated with a rocket-assisted version and the ITS-8 was certainly cited in proposals as a candidate for rocket-assisted take-offs. Cynk states that no rocket-propelled variant was built but another suggests that it was; both are agreed that there is no evidence of flight tests.

== Variants ==
ITS-8
First prototype.
ITS-8W
Second prototype, with more powerful engine, new centre-section aerofoil, improved engine mounting and twin fins. Production prevented by the German invasion of Poland.
ITS-8M
Intended for meteorological research with a fully cantilever wing, flaps and twin wheel retractable landing gear but unfinished before the invasion.

== Specifications (ITS-8) ==
Data from J. Cynk (1971)

General characteristics

- Crew: One
- Length: 6.4 m (21 ft 0 in)
- Wingspan: 13.6 m (44 ft 7 in)
- Wing area: 16.9 m^{2} (182 sq ft)
- Empty weight: 180 kg (397 lb)
- Gross weight: 290 kg (639 lb)
- Powerplant: 1 × Kroeber M3 Köller flat twin engine 18 PS (17.8 hp; 13.2 kW)
- Propellers: 2-bladed Szomański, 1.36 m (4 ft 6 in) diameter wooden fixed-pitch propeller

Performance

- Maximum speed: 120 km/h (75 mph, 65 kn) at sea level
- Cruise speed: 110 km/h (68 mph, 59 kn)
- Service ceiling: 1,500 m (4,900 ft)
- Rate of climb: 1.3 m/s (260 ft/min)
- Rate of sink: 0.91 m/s (179 ft/min) engine off
- Landing speed: 45 km/h (28 mph; 24 kn)
