= Zeppelin Fliegende Panzerfaust =

German WWII-rocket-powered interceptor design

Fliegende Panzerfaust
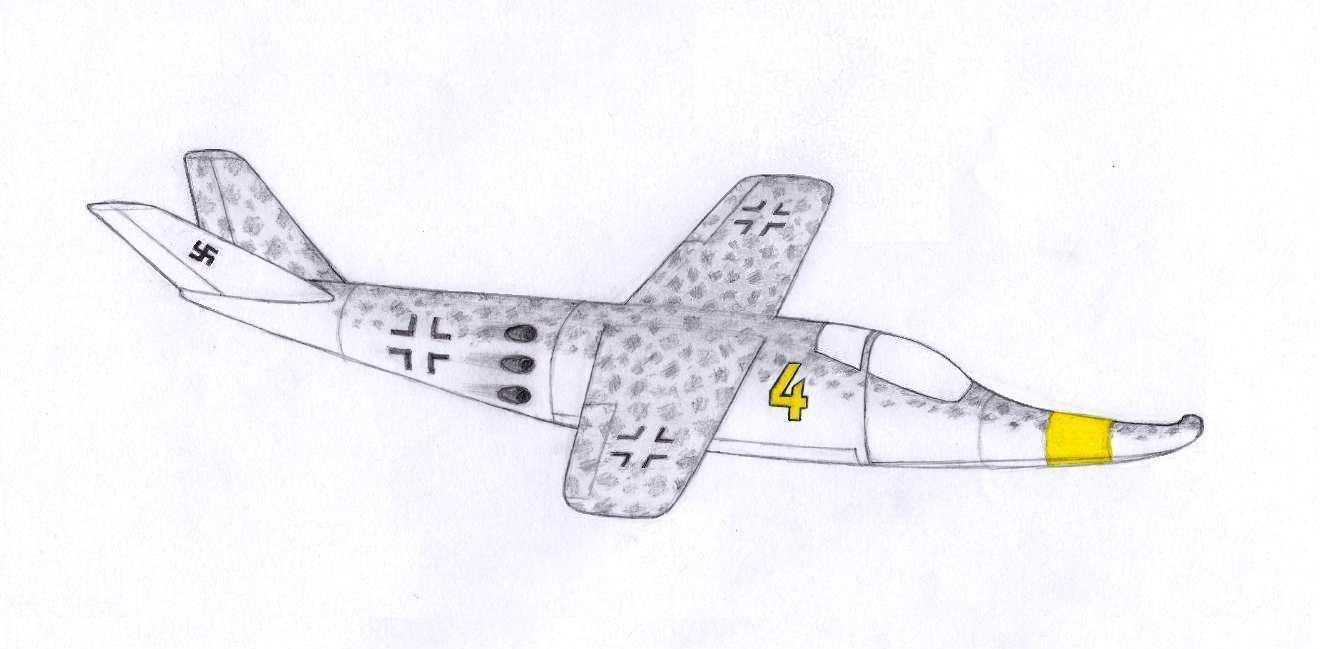

General information
- Type: Very-short-range interceptor
- National origin: Germany
- Manufacturer: Zeppelin
- Primary user: Luftwaffe
- Number built: One mock-up built

History
- Developed from: Zeppelin Rammer

The Fliegende Panzerfaust, meaning 'flying tank fist' (literally 'Flying Armor Fist') in the German language, was a project for a Third Reich very-short-range interceptor designed by Luftschiffbau Zeppelin.

The Fliegende Panzerfaust project was part of the Nazi propaganda-based Wunderwaffe ('wonder weapon') concept. It was proposed to the Emergency Fighter Program against the allied bombing raids over Nazi Germany in the last years of World War II.

== Description ==
The Fliegende Panzerfaust was a rocket-powered design meeting the demand for a low-cost aircraft in a very-short-range interceptor role. It was a parasite aircraft meant to be towed behind a Messerschmitt Bf 109G for which it had a special long, "up-turned" nose for towing. Powered by six Schmidding SG 34 solid-fuel rocket engines, three on each side on the rear half of the fuselage, the Fliegende Panzerfaust was a small aircraft with an armored nose, a v-tail, a wingspan of 4.5 m and a length of 6.0 m.

This Zeppelin-built aircraft would have been released upon reaching combat altitude above the enemy bomber fleet. Shortly before contact with the combat box below it would ignite its engines, attacking the target bomber by firing two 73 mm RZ 65 air-to-air rockets at extremely close range.

Since after expending the fuel the center of gravity would have shifted substantially, making the aircraft too difficult to handle, the front half of the Fliegende Panzerfaust, which had the pilot lying in a prone position, would then separate from the other half. Both parts would land separately using parachutes, being later retrieved and reused. Owing to the extreme risks for the pilot inherent in its operation this aircraft is sometimes referred to as a suicide weapon.

== Specifications ==
Data from Dieter Herwig & Heinz Rode, The Luftwaffe Secret Projects: Ground Attack & Special Purpose Aircraft. Midland Counties Publ. ISBN 978-1857801507

General characteristics

- Crew: one
- Length: 6.0 m (19 ft 8 in)
- Wingspan: 4.50 m (14 ft 9 in)
- Height: 1.50 m (4 ft 11 in)
- Gross weight: 1,200 kg (2,646 lb)
- Powerplant: 6 × Schmidding SG 34 solid-fuel rocket engines, 4.9 kN (1,100 lbf) thrust each - total weight 150 kg

Performance

- Maximum speed: 850 km/h (530 mph, 460 kn)

Armament

- Rockets: 2 RZ 65

== Replicas ==
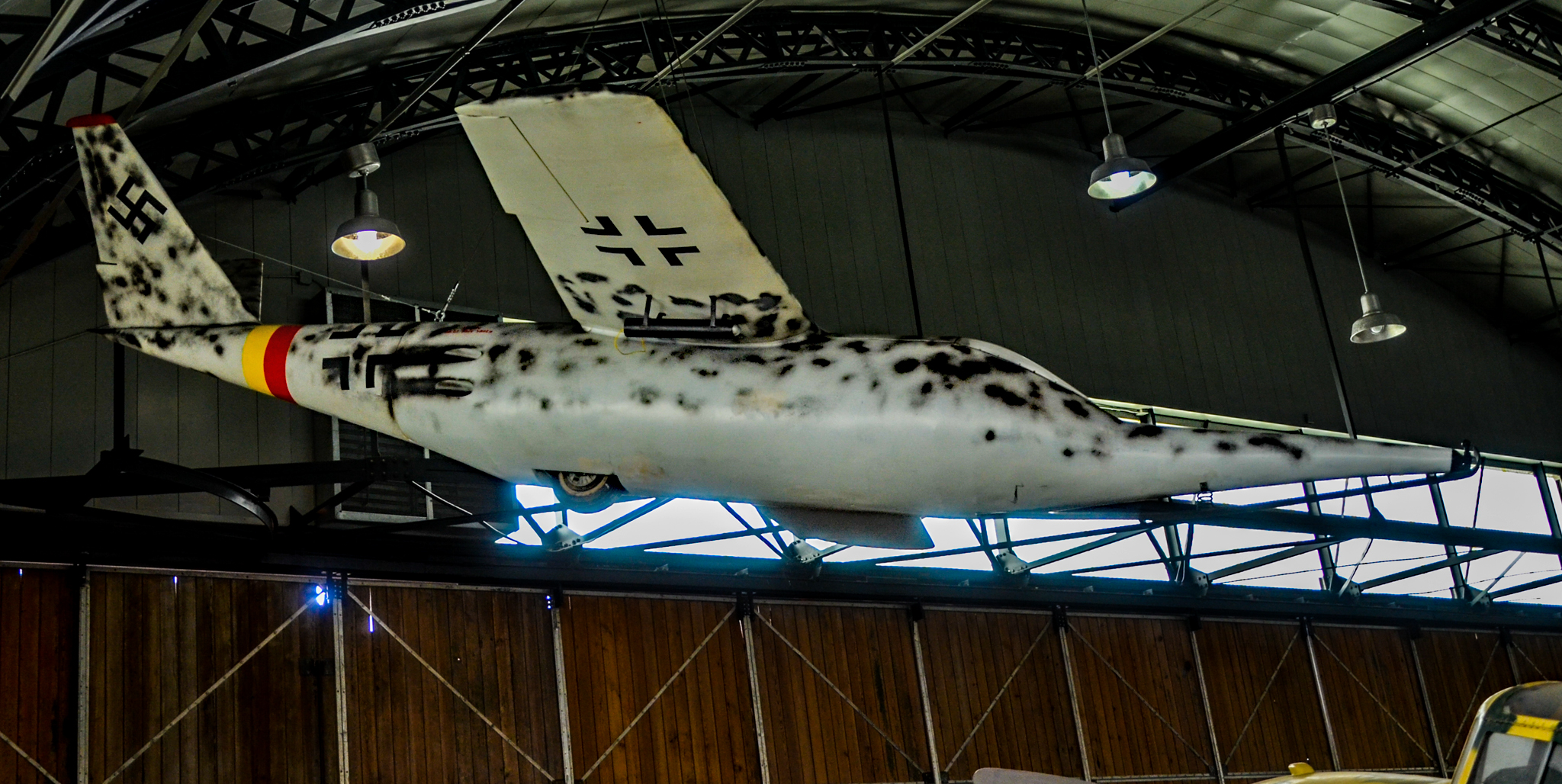
Replica at the Military Aviation Museum in Virginia Beach, Virginia

There is a Fliegende Panzerfaust replica on display at the Military Aviation Museum in Virginia Beach, Virginia.

== See also ==
- Emergency Fighter Program
- Panzerfaust

Aircraft of comparable role, configuration, and era

- Bachem Ba 349
- Blohm & Voss P 214
- DFS Eber
- Zeppelin Rammer
- Focke-Wulf Volksjäger

Related lists

- List of German aircraft projects, 1939–45
- List of rocket aircraft
- List of World War II Luftwaffe aircraft prototype projects

== Bibliography ==
- Manfred Griehl & Joachim Dressel, Die Deutschen Raketenflugzeuge 1935–1945: Die Entwicklung einer umwalzenden Technik, Weltbild, ISBN 3613012766
