= Schmedding =

Schmedding is a surname. Notable people with the name include:

- Jeff Schmedding (born 1978), American football coach
- Jim Schmedding (1946–2025), American football player

== See also ==
- Martin Schmeding (born 1975), German church musician, organist, professor
- Wilhelm Schmidding, German engineer
