= Briffaud GB-6 =

Aircraft

GB-6
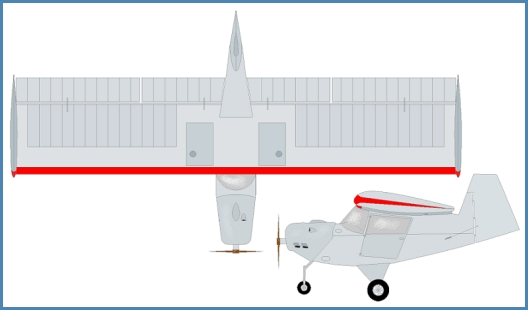

General information
- Type: Light aircraft
- National origin: France
- Manufacturer: Société Aéronautique Normande (SAN)
- Designer: Georges Briffaud
- Number built: 1

History
- First flight: June 1955
- Variant: Briffaud GB-8

The Briffaud GB-6 (also known as the GB-60) was a tailless aircraft developed by Georges Briffaud of France.

== Design and development ==
The GB-6 was a two-seat high wing monoplane with tricycle undercarriage, built mainly of wood with fabric and plywood skinning. The enclosed cockpit sat under the straight, rectangular wing which was given a slight dihedral. Each wing tip ended in a shallow end-plate fairing. The tail had a conventional fin with rudder, but no horizontal stabilizer. The wing was built using an original aerofoil section similar to the NACA 23012, the trailing edge of which is reflexed upwards with reverse camber to prevent movement of the centre of pressure with angle of attack and in this way to obtain longitudinal stability. Control was achieved using the rudder and full-span elevons.

Power was provided by a 40 hp (30 kW) Lutetia 4.C.02 2-stroke air-cooled V-4 engine.

== Operational history ==
The GB-6 made a single flight at the hands of Lucien Querey, director of the Société Aeronautique Normande where it had been built. On landing, the undercarriage collapsed on uneven ground, seriously damaging the aircraft.

The wing was recovered and used for the construction of a motor-glider, the Briffaud GB-80 Aérovoilier (or GB-80) F-CRAJ, which made its first flight on 21 September 1960 as a glider, due to the lack of a starter for the intended 18 hp (13 kW) Kroeber M4 engine.
