= Möller Stomo 3 =

Stomo 3

General information
- Type: Light aircraft
- National origin: Germany
- Manufacturer: Möller Flugzeugbau
- Designer: H. G. Möller

History
- First flight: April 1939

The Möller Stomo 3 was a small, low-powered but very aerodynamically-clean light aircraft, first flown in Germany in 1939. It set two speed over distance records for aircraft with engines of less than 2 L (120 cu in) capacity soon after its first flight.

== Design ==
By early 1939 H.G. Möller Flugzeugbau had tested a small, single seat, cantilever, inverted gull wing sports aircraft of striking aerodynamic cleanliness. Though its Kroeber M4 flat twin engine produced only 13 kW (18 hp), the Stomo-3 had a maximum speed of 152 km/h (94 mph; 82 kn). At the same time the company was completing a smaller span single-seater in the same clean style but with a 37 kW (50 hp) Zündapp 9-092 four cylinder air-cooled, inverted inline engine labelled V11 Stürmer.

The Stomo 3 was an all wood aircraft, designed to be simple to build without specialist tools and to have low capital and running costs, together with good performance and aerobatic capability. Its low wing was in three parts: a 1.80 m (5 ft 11 in) centre section with anhedral, improving the wing root aerodynamics, and outer panels with about 6° of dihedral, producing the inverted gull wing. Structurally, the single spar centre section was an integral part of the plywood -skinned fuselage and cockpit and the outer panels were also built around single spars and wooden ribs, with ply-covered leading edges back to the spars and fabric covered aft. Each wing was trapezoidal in plan, with sweep only on the leading edges and with rounded tips. Short, broad ailerons were placed at the tips and mounted on false spars, as were the inboard split flaps.

It had an oval section, monocoque fuselage with formers, stringers and ply skin. The Zundapp engine was neatly cowled in the nose and the enclosed cockpit was over the wing, blended into the raised fuselage behind it which tapered to a conventional, cantilever empennage. An almost triangular tailplane carried rounded elevators and the straight-edged fin carried a broad, deep, rounded rudder well clear of the elevator wash. The rudder had a small, ground-adjustable trim tab.

The Stomo 3 had a tailskid undercarriage with a track of 1.63 m (5 ft 4 in), its vertical, bungee-damped main legs mounted on the wing centre section spar, close to the junction with the outer panels. The legs and much of the wheels were enclosed in fairings and a long, cantilever tailskid kept the rudder clear of the ground.

== Operational history ==
The first Stomo 3 left the factory in April 1939 and obtained its Certificate of Airworthiness following some hours of optimisation after its first flight. Registered as D-YNER, it was soon setting new record speeds over the distances recognised for aircraft with engines of less than 2 L (120 cu in), 100 km (62 mi; 54 nmi) and 1,000 km (620 mi; 540 nmi). On 19 April Max Brandenburg broke the first with an average speed of 185.352 km/h (115.172 mph; 100.082 kn) despite strong side winds on his out and return flight. On the 27 April he completed a 1000 km circuit at an average of 187.776 km/h (116.679 mph; 101.391 kn).

In 1939 the Stomo 3 was under consideration as a military trainer, though there is no record of serial production or of any service prototypes.

Möller also designed and built the Möller Stromer, a similar two seat aircraft.

== Variants ==
V3
Temperolus, powered by a 18 PS (17.8 hp; 13.2 kW) Kroeber M4 2-cylinder 2-stroke horizontally opposed air-cooled piston engine.
V11
Stürmer, powered by a 18 PS (18 hp; 13 kW) Zündapp 9-092 air-cooled inverted in-line piston engine.
Möller Stürmer
the V11 renamed.
unknown prototype
powered by a 24 kW (32 hp) Seld engine, 50 kg (110 lb) lighter and lower performance.

== Specifications (Stomo 3 Stürmer) ==
Data from Les Ailes June 1939

General characteristics

- Crew: One
- Length: 5.90 m (19 ft 4 in)
- Wingspan: 7.60 m (24 ft 11 in)
- Height: 1.60 m (5 ft 3 in)
- Wing area: 9.60 m^{2} (103.3 sq ft)
- Empty weight: 205 kg (452 lb)
- Gross weight: 330 kg (728 lb)
- Fuel capacity: 50 L (11 imp gal; 13 US gal)
- Powerplant: 1 × Zündapp 9-092 4-cylinder air-cooled, inverted inline, 40 kW (53 hp) maximum; 37 kW (50 hp) at 2,300 rpm
- Propellers: 2-bladed Schwarz, 1.70 m (5 ft 7 in) diameter wood

Performance

- Maximum speed: 215 km/h (134 mph, 116 kn)
- Cruise speed: 210 km/h (130 mph, 110 kn)
- Service ceiling: 5,200 m (17,100 ft) practical
- Time to altitude: 182 s to 1,000 m (3,300 ft)
