= Suicide weapon =

Type of weapon

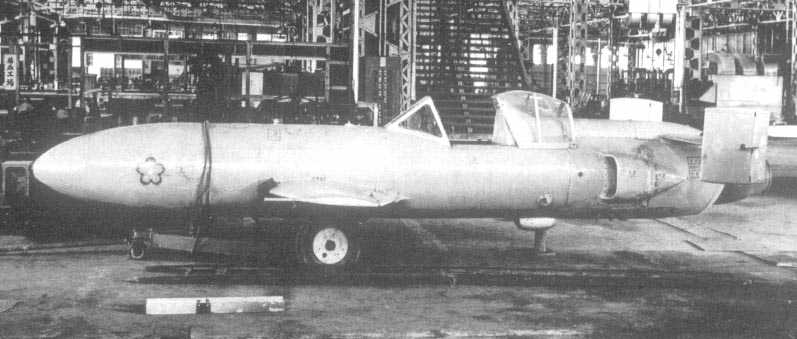
Yokosuka MXY7 Ohka, a weapon especially designed for a suicide attack

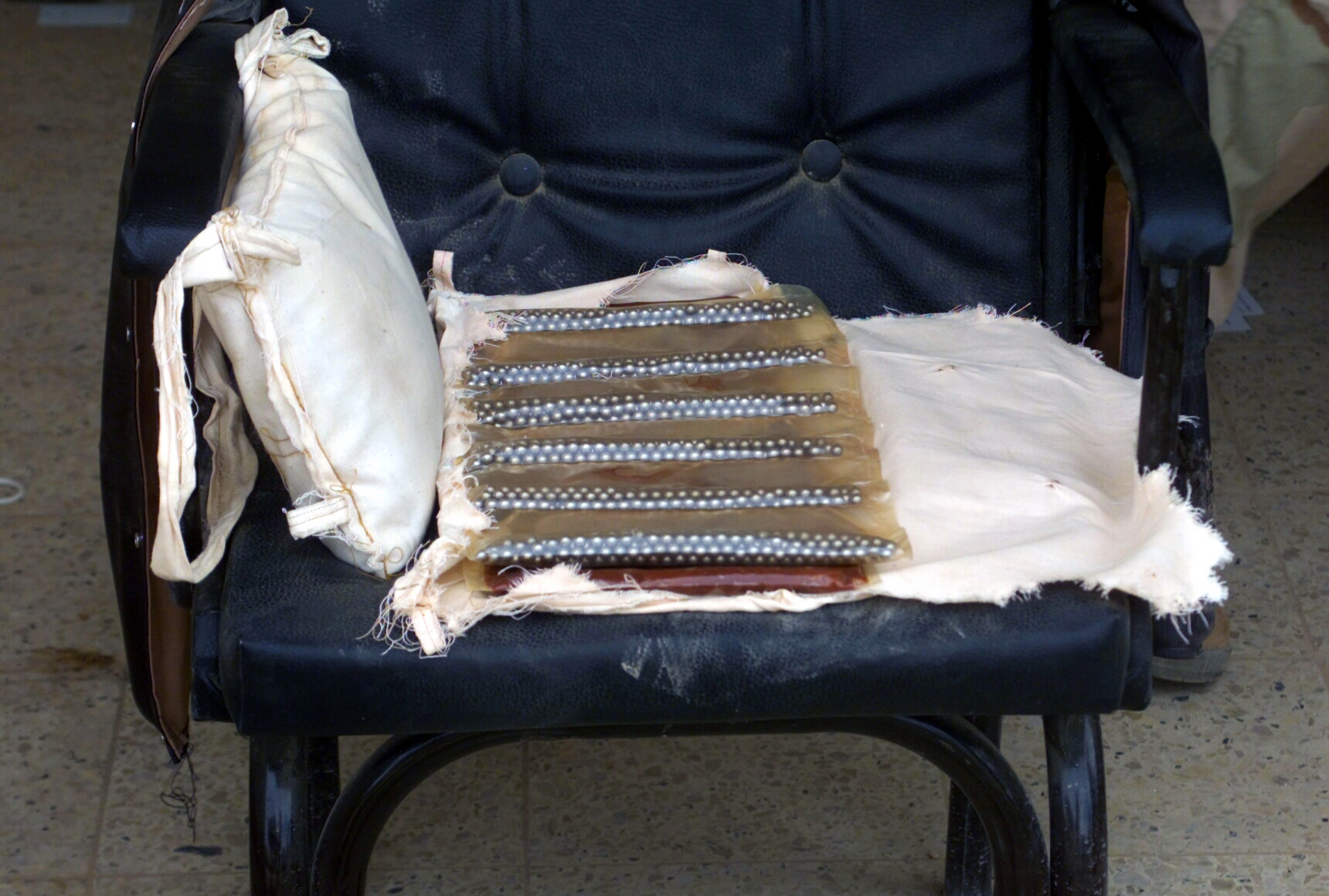
A suicide vest with ball bearings

A suicide weapon is a weapon designed to be used in a suicide attack, typically based on explosives.

== History ==
Suicide weapons have been used both in conventional warfare, as well as in terrorism.

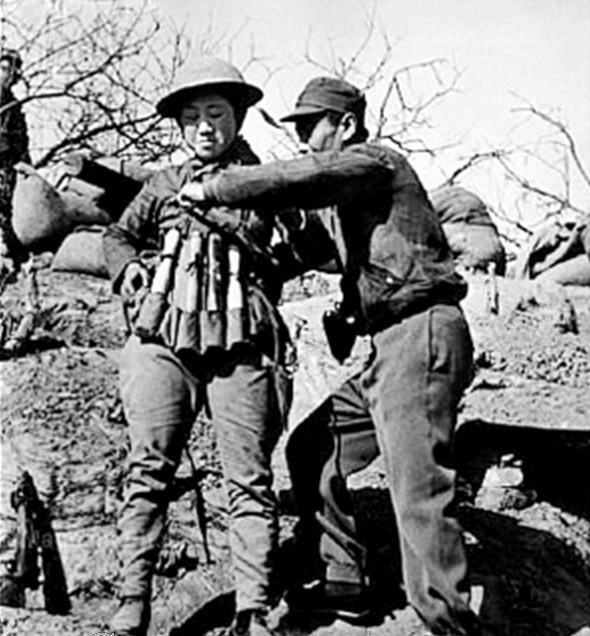
Chinese suicide bomber putting on an explosive vest made out of Model 24 hand grenades to use in an attack on Japanese tanks at the Battle of Taierzhuang.

In the Second Sino-Japanese War, Chinese forces used suicide bombing against the Japanese with explosive vests. A Chinese soldier detonated a grenade vest and killed 20 Japanese at Sihang Warehouse. Chinese troops strapped explosives such as grenade packs or dynamite to their bodies and threw themselves under Japanese tanks to blow them up. This tactic was used during the Battle of Shanghai, where a Chinese suicide bomber stopped a Japanese tank column by exploding himself beneath the lead tank, and at the Battle of Taierzhuang where dynamite and grenades were strapped on by Chinese troops who rushed at Japanese tanks and blew themselves up. During one incident at Taierzhuang, Chinese suicide bombers destroyed four Japanese tanks with grenade bundles.

The Pacific War of World War II saw the first Japanese kamikaze suicide attack pilots ("kamikaze" was not a term used by the Japanese themselves). Late in the war, as the tide turned against Japan, kamikaze pilots were deployed in attempts to crash their aircraft into American and Allied ships in the Pacific. The Japanese developed specialized aircraft for the tactic, such as the Yokosuka Ohka flying bomb. A successful kamikaze attack would both kill the plane's pilot and damage the target ship, possibly even sinking it. Related tactics included the kaiten suicide minisub, a human torpedo which a single Japanese pilot would steer into an Allied ship.

North Korean tanks were attacked by South Koreans with suicide tactics during the Korean War. American tanks at Seoul were also attacked by North Korean suicide squads, who carried satchel charges on their bodies. A North Korean soldier named Li Su-Bok, who destroyed an American tank during one such attack, is hailed as a hero in North Korea.

Certain aircraft built or projected for the Luftwaffe during the time of the Allied bombing before the surrender of Nazi Germany in World War II, such as the Bachem Ba 349, Fliegende Panzerfaust, Sombold So 344, Zeppelin Rammer or the Blohm & Voss BV 40 are sometimes listed as suicide weapons. However, they were not intended as such, even though the chances of survival would have been very limited for the pilots of such dangerous artifacts. In those years Nazi authorities considered the use of selbstopfer (suicide) planes such as the Messerschmitt Me 328 and the Fieseler 103.

Political groups using suicide weapons in the post-Cold War era include mainly outfits affiliated to Islamic terrorism, among which even children have been used in order to escape detection when carrying out suicide attacks. However, non-Islamic groups, such as the Liberation Tigers of Tamil Eelam, also have been prone to use suicide weapons. Today, the most common suicide weapons used to carry out terrorist attacks are car bombs or truck bombs, as well as antipersonnel bombs carried by a single person. Suicide bombers strap explosives, often covered with nails, screws, or other items intended to act as fragments, to their bodies or otherwise carry them into populated areas and detonate them. The Tamil Tigers of Sri Lanka are known for having made high-profile use of this method in the assassination of Rajiv Gandhi. Similar methods have been also used by Palestinian terrorist groups in the Israeli–Palestinian conflict, among others.

Kamikaze attacks were mimicked in the September 11 attacks in 2001, in which a group of mostly Saudi terrorists destroyed the World Trade Center and part of the Pentagon by flying hijacked jet airliners into them. It was the first and only time in history that hijacked jet airliners filled with fuel were used as cruise missiles against targets of such magnitude.

== Examples ==
- Suicide bombs
  - Explosive belt
  - SVBIEDs
    - Car bomb
- Kamikaze attacks by Japan in WWII
  - Kaiten - human-steered torpedo
  - Ohka - human-controlled missile/suicide attack parasite aircraft
  - Shin'yō - human-steered suicide speedboat
  - Fukuryu - suicide attack frogmen
  - Lunge mine - suicidal anti-tank mine

== See also ==
- Japanese Special Attack Units
