= Ścibor-Rylski ŚR-3 =

General information
- Type: Single-seat ultralight
- National origin: Poland
- Designer: Adam Ścibor-Rylski
- Number built: 1

History
- First flight: Late August 1939

The Ścibor-Rylski ŚR-3 was a Polish, ultralight, low power, single-seat sports aircraft. First flown in August 1939, only one was completed before World War II.

== Design and development ==
Like several other amateur Polish designers in the 1930s, Adam Ścibor-Rylski was interested in simple, low cost machines. As a student at the Warsaw Technical University, he began his studies with the ŚR-1, an attempt to motorize the Wrona basic, open-frame glider. Difficulties in mounting an engine in this structure led to the ŚR-2 which had the Wrona wing married to a new nacelle. By 1937 he had dropped these projects in favour of a more refined, cabin aircraft. This, the ŚR-3, was the subject of his diploma. With the encouragement of LOPP and the Silesian Gliding Workshop (SWS) he received government funding.

The ŚR-3 was a wooden aircraft with a high cantilever wing. The wing was a one piece structure built around a single spar and tapered in plan. It was plywood covered apart from a small fabric covered area aft of the auxiliary spar that carried the ailerons. These were unbalanced and operated differentially.

It was first fitted with a 19 kW (25 hp) Avia 4 flat-four engine which failed during ground trials and was replaced by a 22–24 kW (30–32 hp) Sarolea Albatros flat twin with a fuel tank in the wing. Behind the engine the fuselage was a rectangular section, stressed ply skinned structure, with a rounded roof between the wing trailing edge and the tail where the fuselage narrowed strongly in profile. The ŚR-3's single-seat cockpit was under the wing leading edge and had an upward hinged, one-piece transparent cover.

Its empennage was also ply covered and unbalanced, with the tailplane mounted on top of the fuselage. The fin was almost triangular and carried a full, semi-elliptical rudder which operated between the elevators.

The ŚR-3 had small mainwheels mounted close to the fuselage on short, curved V-struts which had a rubber-in-compression shock absorber within the fuselage.

Zbiniew Żabski flew the ŚR-3 on its first flight at the end of August 1939. Though SWS had hoped to produce the ŚR-3 in both kit and complete forms, the German invasion of Poland a few days after the first flight ended such hopes. The ŚR-3 was reportedly taken by the invaders and flown by the Dortmund Nazi youth organisation.

== Specifications ==
Data from J. Cynk (1971) (Dimensions approximate)

General characteristics

- Crew: One
- Length: 6.5 m (21 ft 4 in)
- Wingspan: 8 m (26 ft 3 in)
- Wing area: 10 m^{2} (110 sq ft)
- Empty weight: 160 kg (353 lb)
- Gross weight: 250 kg (551 lb)
- Powerplant: 1 × Sarolea Albatros air-cooled flat twin, 22–24 kW (30–32 hp)

Performance

- Endurance: 2 h
