= Zeppelin Rammer =

Type of aircraft

General information
- Type: Ramming interceptor
- National origin: Nazi Germany
- Manufacturer: Zeppelin
- Primary user: Luftwaffe

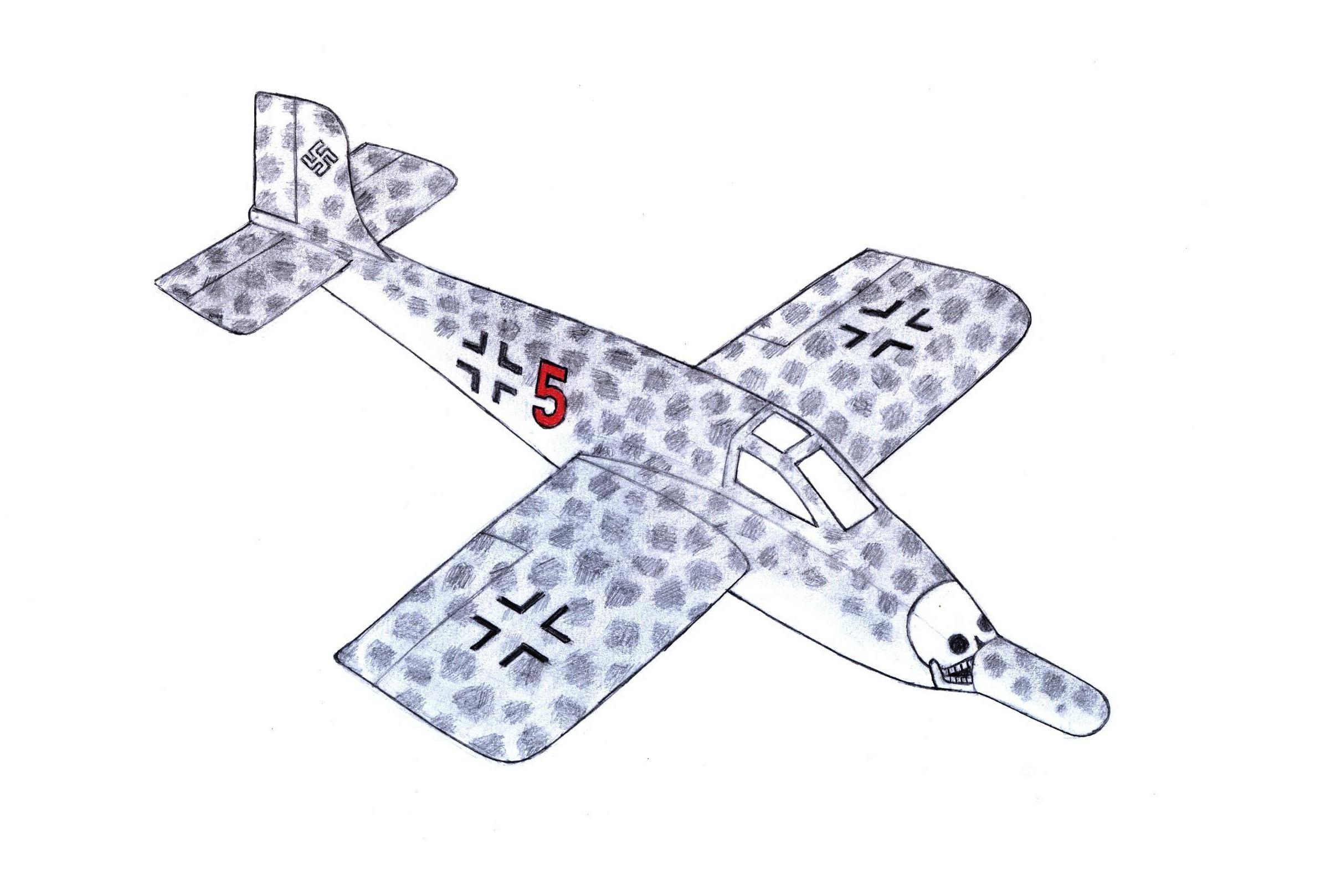
Artist's drawing of the Zeppelin Rammer

The Zeppelin Rammer (German: Rammjäger) was an in-development rocket-powered aircraft by the German aircraft manufacturer Luftschiffbau Zeppelin. The company commenced design work on the aircraft during the latter half of 1944. While a prototype order for the Rammer was allegedly placed in January 1945, it was ultimately unfulfilled after Zeppelin's production facility was destroyed by Allied aerial attacks.

The Rammer's name comes from its primary attack, having been intended to conduct aerial ramming attacks against the Allied bombers attacking Nazi Germany during the latter portion of the Second World War. A typical mission would have involved conducting a pair of attack runs, the first pass firing the aircraft's compliment of rockets while the second pass was to involve an intentional collision with either the tail or wings of the enemy bomber, after which (if the Rammer survived) it was expected to perform an unpowered descent back to base. Although some sources refer to the Rammer as a suicide weapon, this was not an expressed intention of the design.

== Description ==
In terms of its general configuration, the Zeppelin Rammer was a compact rocket-powered aircraft furnished with straight wings that had a constant-chord. It was intended to be flown by a single pilot and powered by a single Schmidding 533 rocket motor, which would be fuelled using a solid propellant; this was viewed as being simpler than a liquid-fuelled counterpart. The tubular-shaped nose of the aircraft was relatively lengthy in order to accommodate the 14 R4M 55 mm rockets. The Rammer was to be equipped with a jettisonable tricycle undercarriage. A retractable ski mounted underneath the forward fuselage was also to be provided for landing upon open ground.

The envisioned mission profile for the aircraft was for it to be towed or carried aloft by a conventional fighter aircraft before being released when in the vicinity of enemy bombers. Shortly after being released, the pilot would ignite the Rammer's rocket engine, permitting it to rapidly accelerate to up to 600 mph (970 km/h) before closing in on the target aircraft and conducting an initial high speed pass, during which all of the Rammer's 14 nose-mounted rockets were to be fired. Once all munitions have been expended, the pilot was expected to perform a second pass of the enemy bomber, during which they would attempt to ram their aircraft into it, specifically in vulnerable areas such as the wings or tail section. The aircraft was expected to survive the ramming of the bomber without any major loss of speed nor stability; the Rammer featured not only an armoured cockpit, but the wings and fuselage were reinforced for considerable sturdiness, and being largely composed of steel. On account of the high risk that the pilot would be inherently exposed to in its aircraft's intended attack profile, the Rammer has been sometimes been categorised as a suicide weapon, however, this aspect was not an expressed intention of the aircraft. Following a successful ramming, the aircraft was expected to perform an unpowered glide back to base, after which it could be recovered and reused.

During November 1944, the German aircraft manufacturer Luftschiffbau Zeppelin, issued its proposal. Two months later, the company received an initial order for sixteen prototypes and work commenced accordingly. Despite this, no known designation was ever assigned to the aircraft by the Reichsluftfahrtministerium (RLM, Ministry of Aviation). Ultimately, all work on the project was effectively terminated when the Zeppelin factory was destroyed by a USAAF air raid.

== See also ==
- Aerial ramming
- Emergency Fighter Program

Aircraft of comparable role, configuration, and era

- Bachem Ba 349 Natter
- DFS Eber
- DFS Rammer
- Fliegende Panzerfaust
- Focke-Wulf Volksjäger
- Northrop XP-79 known colloquially as the "flying chainsaw"

Related lists

- List of German aircraft projects, 1939–45
- List of rocket aircraft
