= Kocjan Bąk =

Polish motorglider

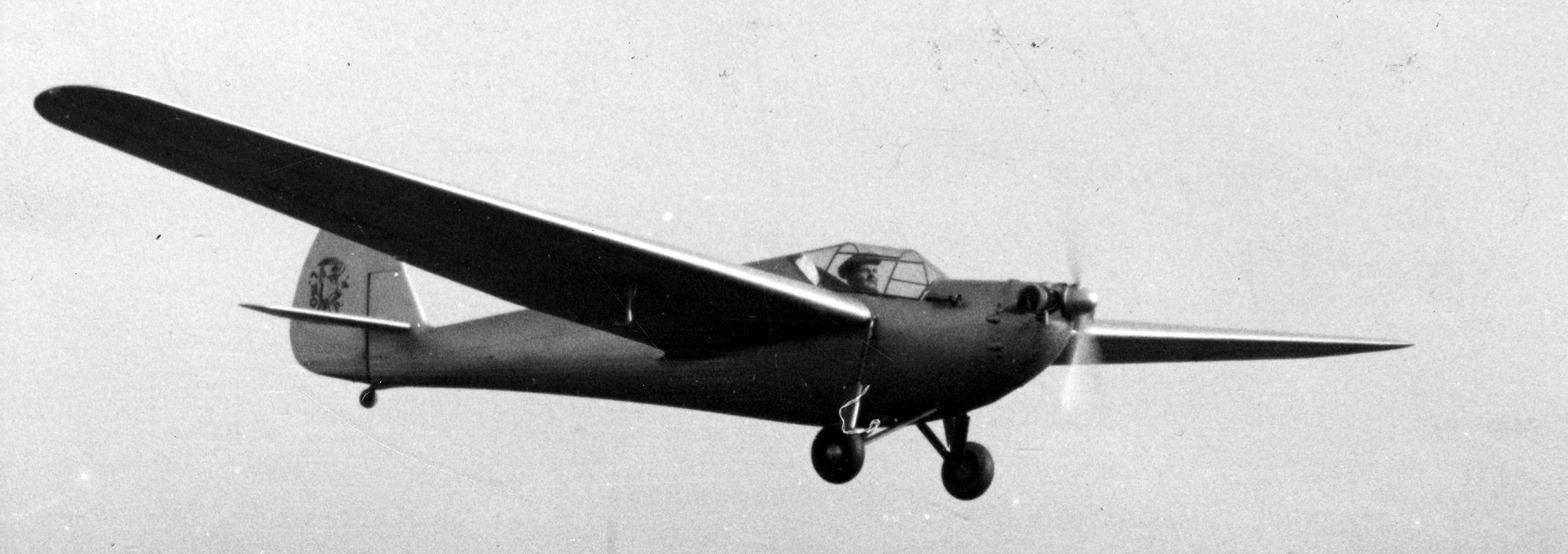

General information
- Type: Motor Glider
- National origin: Poland
- Manufacturer: Warsztaty Szybowcowe
- Designer: Antoni Kocjan
- Number built: at least 27

History
- First flight: March 1937

The Bąk (Horse-Fly) was a single seat motor glider designed and built in Poland from 1936.

== Development ==
Affiliated to D.W.L., the Warsztaty Szybowcowe – glider workshops produced the Bᾳk, designed by Antoni Kocjan, to compete with the ITS-8 which had been designed to a specification from the I.T.S.M. (Instytut Techniki Szybownictwa i Motoszybownictwa – institute of gliding and motor-gliding techniques), for a cheap ultra-light aircraft suitable for converting trained glider pilots to powered flying. The Bąk I was an immediate success with excellent performance and good handling qualities, passing I.T.L. (Instytut Techniczny Lotnictwa – Technical aviation institute) and airworthiness tests without problems, also proving to have relatively good gliding performance.

The Bąk was built primarily of wood with plywood in a semi-monocoque fuselage and cantilevered single spar wooden wings, with plywood skinned leading edge torsion boxes and wing roots, mid set on the fuselage with marked dihedral. The tail unit comprised a fin, with rudder, integral with the fuselage and a cantilever ply and fabric covered all-flying tailplane, all control surfaces were statically balanced and mounted on ball bearings. Various engines of 16 to 32 hp could be fitted, with the majority of the production Bąk II's was the 32 hp Sarolea Albatros engine driving a twoblade fixed pitch Szomański propeller.

Designer of the Bąk, Antoni Kocjan, became part of the Polish Underground resistance and was killed in the Warsaw Uprising.

== Operational history ==
The Bąk won a FAI world record for duration of flight in a Class D motorglider. The aircraft flew 5hr 24 minute on less than 5 U.S. gallons (19 L; 4.2 imp gal) of fuel. It also won a record for altitude, reaching 15,075 ft (4,595 m).

== Variants ==
Bąk I
The prototype and first production machines fitted with an 13.4 kW (18 hp) Kroeber M4 Köller, two- cylinder, horizontally opposed, two-stroke air-cooled engine, (SP-692 and SP-1102 are two known glider registrations).
Bąk II
Production aircraft fitted with a 23.9 kW (32 hp) Sarolea Albatros two-cylinder horizontally opposed air-cooled engine, 25 built.

== Specifications (Bąk II) ==
Data from Polish Aircraft 1893–1939

General characteristics

- Crew: 1
- Length: 6 m (19 ft 8 in)
- Wingspan: 12.2 m (40 ft 0 in)
- Height: 1.45 m (4 ft 9 in)
- Wing area: 13.2 m^{2} (142 sq ft)
- Empty weight: 207 kg (456 lb)
- Gross weight: 325 kg (717 lb)
- Fuel capacity: Fuel:40 L (8.80 imp gal; 10.57 US gal), Oil:4.5 L (0.99 imp gal; 1.19 US gal)
- Powerplant: 1 × Saroléa Albatros 2-cyl air-cooled horizontally opposed piston engine, 24 kW (32 hp)
- Propellers: 2-bladed Szomański wooden fixed pitch propeller

Performance

- Maximum speed: 152 km/h (94 mph, 82 kn)
- Cruise speed: 130 km/h (81 mph, 70 kn)
- Never exceed speed: 180 km/h (110 mph, 97 kn)
- Endurance: 4 hours
- Service ceiling: 5,200 m (17,100 ft)
- Rate of climb: 2.5 m/s (490 ft/min)
- Rate of sink: 1.5 m/s (300 ft/min) at 70 km/h (43 mph; 38 kn) engine off
- Wing loading: 24.6 kg/m^{2} (5.0 lb/sq ft)
- Power/mass: 0.0747 kW/kg (0.4545 hp/lb)
- Take-off distance to clear 8 m (26 ft): 70 m (230 ft)

== See also ==
Aircraft of comparable role, configuration, and era

- Scheibe SF-24 Motorspatz
