= Wilhelm Schmidding =

German WW2 constructor of rocket engines

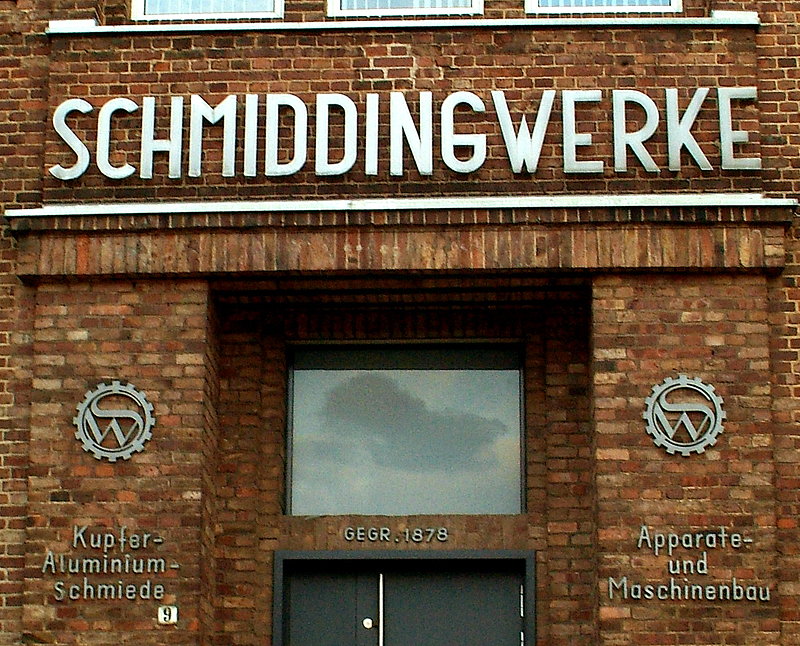
Entry to the Schmiddingwerke in Hanover

Wilhelm Schmidding from Bodenbach, Germany, was a World War II constructor of rocket engines used for RATO. Factories were in Schmiedeberg, and from summer 1943, in Buschvorwerk (Riesengebirge, Niederschlesien, today Krzaczyna).

== Engines ==
- Schmidding 109-513, two solid fuel fitted to the Henschel Hs 293H anti-ship missile.
- Schmidding 109-533, four jettisonable RATO (1.200 kp, 11,768 kN, 10 seconds) fitted to the Bachem Ba 349 point defence vertical takeoff (VTO) interceptor.
- Schmidding 109-543, rocket motor for the Henschel Hs 298 guided bomb.
- Schmidding 109-553, Solid-fuel rocket booster used for the Henschel Hs 117 "Schmetterling" surface-to-air guided missile.
- Schmidding 109-563, RATOG booster.
- Schmidding 109-573, underwater propulsion gas generator.
- Schmidding 109-593, RATOG booster.
- Schmidding 109-603, fitted to the 8-344 Ruhrstahl X-4 air-to-air missile.

=== Applications ===
- Bachem Ba 349
- Henschel Hs 117
- Henschel Hs 293H variant
- Henschel Hs 298
- Ruhrstahl X-4
- Zeppelin Fliegende Panzerfaust
- Zeppelin Rammer
