= Lutetia 4.C.02 =

- Type: Air-cooled, 90° V-4 two-stroke engine
- National origin: France
- Manufacturer: Moteurs Lutetia
- Designer: Marcel Echard
- First run: c. 1950

The Lutetia 4.C.02 was a small V-4 two-stroke engine designed soon after World War II and intended to power light aircraft.

== Design and development ==
Marcel Echard was an engine designer with a lifetime interest in two-strokes. His first such engine was built in 1911 and he began work on the 4.C.02 in 1949. By 1953 this engine had achieved its homologation and had been test-flown on a Jodel D.9. The Briffaud GB-6 is the only known application, a one-off aircraft with a short life, though not because of its engine.

Unusually for a two-stroke, the fuel/air mixture was compressed externally rather than in the crankcase.

== Applications ==
- Briffaud GB-6

== Specifications ==
Data from Jane's All the World's Aircraft 1953-54

=== General characteristics ===
- Type: air-cooled, 90° V-4 two-stroke engine
- Bore: 76 mm (3.0 in)
- Stroke: 70 mm (2.8 in)
- Displacement: 1.267 L (77.32 cu in)
- Length: 647.5 mm (25.49 in)
- Width: 494 mm (19.4 in)
- Height: 518 mm (20.4 in)
- Dry weight: 46 kg (101 lb)

=== Components ===
- Fuel system: standard carburettor followed by compressor injection into cylinders; no crankcase compression.
- Oil system: pressure fed from finned sump by internal pump
- Cooling system: air; heads cast in finned pairs
- Ignition system: twin magnetos, two plugs/cylinder

=== Performance ===
- Power output: take-off and maximum continuous, 33 kW (44 hp) at 2,800 rpm; cruise, 23 kW (31 hp) at 2,500 rpm; cruise
- Compression ratio: 7.2
- Fuel consumption: 377 gm/kW/hr (0.535 lb/hp/hr)
