= Schmidding SG 34 =

Type of rocket motor

Schmidding SG 34 (109-533)
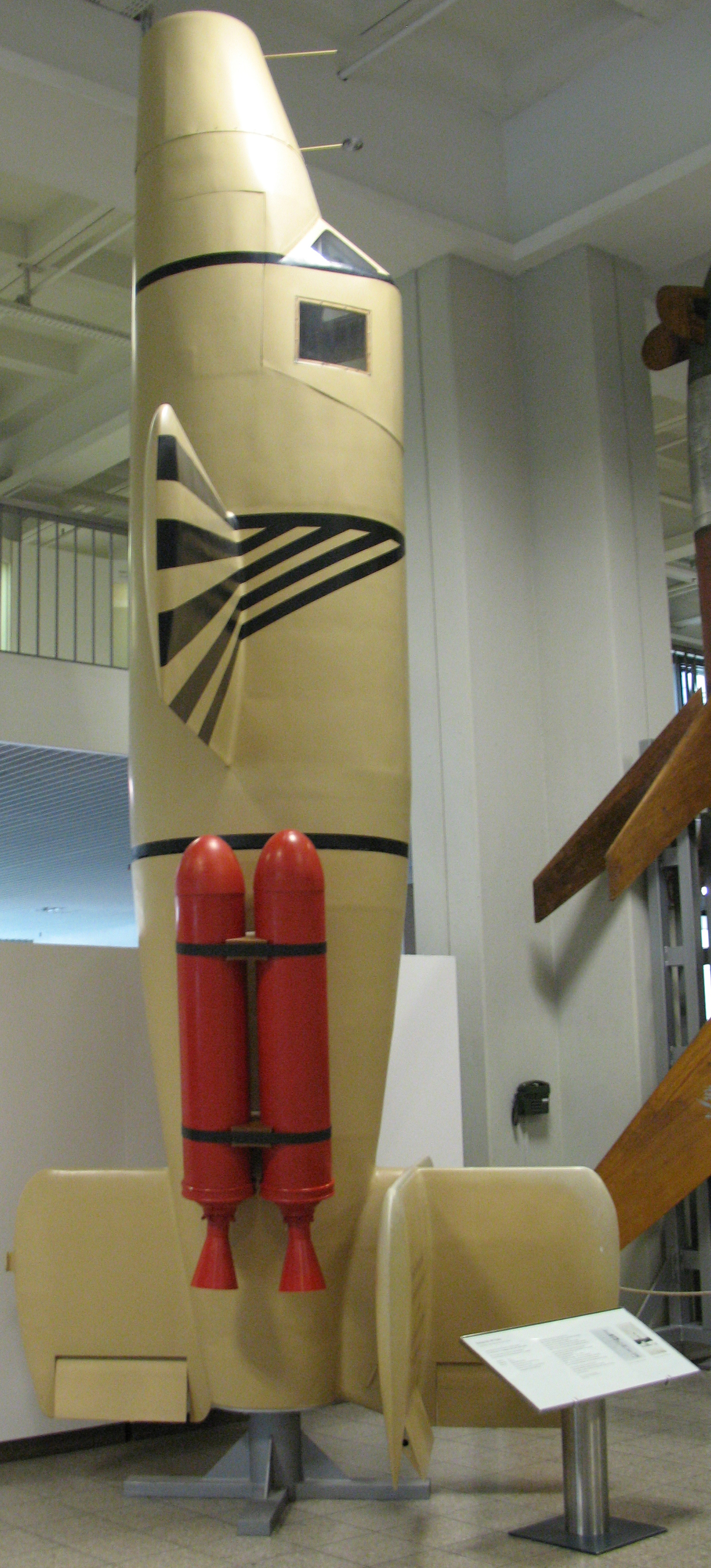
- Model of the Bachem Natter with the Schmidding SG 34 rocket motors in red
- Country of origin: Germany
- First flight: 1945
- Manufacturer: Schmidding Werke
- Application: RATO
- Status: Retired

Solid Fuel

Performance
- Thrust: 1,200 kgf (2,600 lbf; 12 kN)
- Burn time: 10 seconds

Dimensions
- Length: 118 cm (46 in)
- Diameter: 25.5 cm (10.0 in)

Used in
- Bachem Ba 349 Natter

The Schmidding SG 34 (109–533) was a German World War II-era solid-fuelled rocket motor. Four SG 34s were used on the Bachem Ba 349 Natter to provide extra thrust for launching.

== Design and development ==
The Bachem Ba 349 Natter was originally designed with Schmidding SR 34 rocket boosters; however these were upgraded to the more powerful 1,200kgf thrust SG 34s in December 1944. The SG 34 was manufactured by Schmidding Werke at the company's factory in Děčín, in what is now the Czech Republic.

Four SG 34 solid fuel rocket boosters were fitted to the prototype Bachem Natter. The booster rockets were designed to augment the thrust from the Natter's single Walter HWK 509 engine and were most likely released by explosive shearing bolts shortly after takeoff.
