= Saroléa Albatros =

Albatros
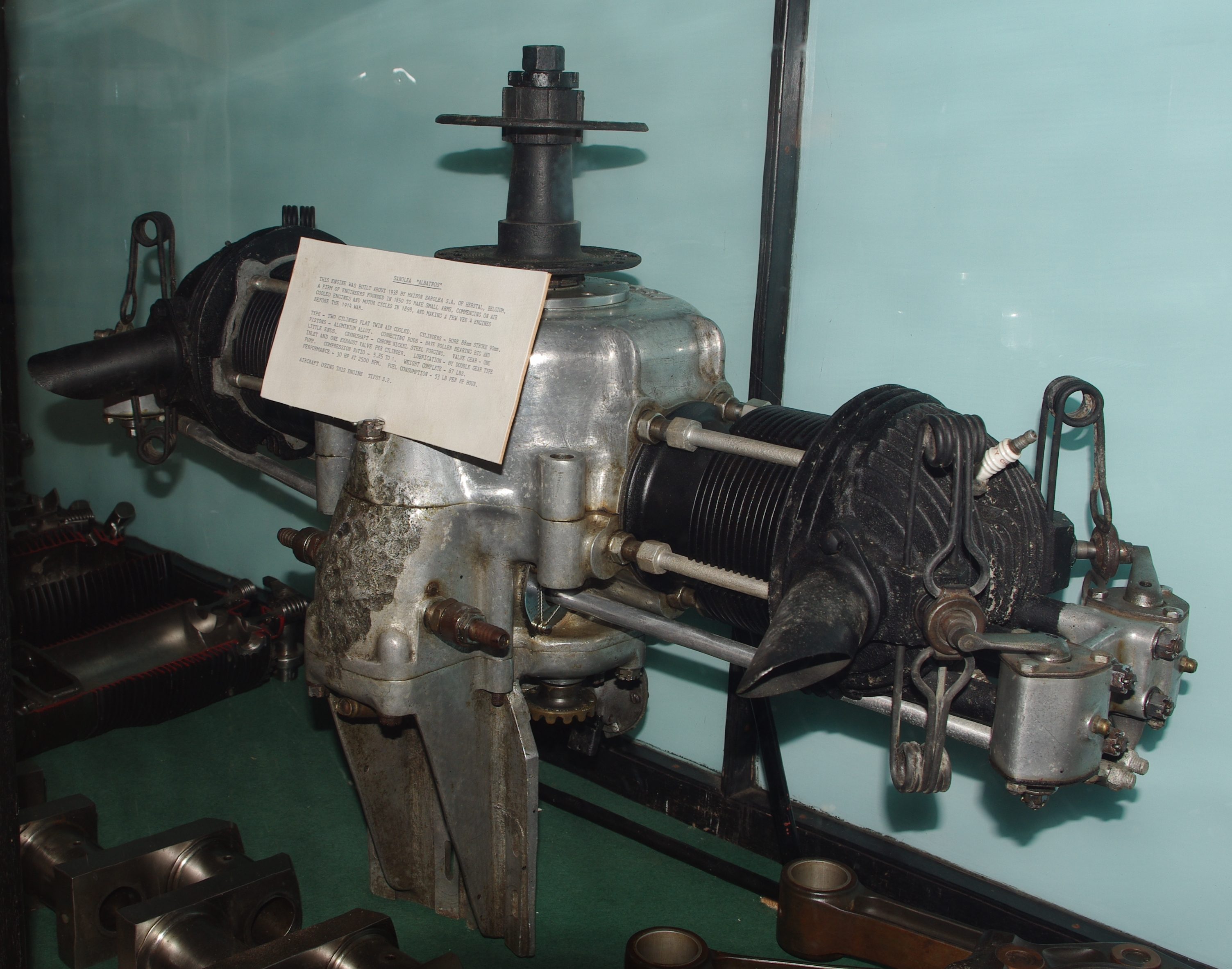
- National origin: Belgium
- Manufacturer: Maison Saroléa S.A.
- First run: c. 1938

The Saroléa Albatros was a 22 kW (30 hp) flat twin air-cooled aircraft engine, produced just before World War II in Belgium.

== Design and development ==
In the 1930s, Saroléa were one of the biggest motorcycle producers in Europe, using their own engines. They also designed and built small flat twin engines for light aircraft. The Albatros dates from about 1938.

It had chrome-nickel steel machined piston barrels, with closely spaced 3.0 mm (0.12 in) cooling fins. The cylinder heads were aluminium alloy, with hemispherical combustion chambers and bronze valve seats. The connecting rods had big and little ends with roller bearings. The crankshaft was a chrome nickel steel forging, running in a combination of roller and ball bearings; a ball bearing at the output side crankshaft end allowed the Albatros to be used in either pusher or tractor configuration.

With a maximum power of only 24 kW (32 hp) at 2,650 rpm, the Abatros was targeted at the small single seat sports aircraft of the day.

== Applications ==
These types were also fitted, or planned to be fitted with other small engines.

- Kocjan Bąk II
- Ścibor-Rylski ŚR-3
- Tipsy S.2

== Engines on display ==
- A Saroléa Albatros is on display at Old Warden in the Shuttleworth Collection.

== Specifications ==
Data from Jane's All the World's Aircraft 1938 p.3d

=== General characteristics ===
- Type: Flat twin
- Bore: 88 mm (3.465 in)
- Stroke: 90 mm (3.543 in)
- Displacement: 1.10 L (67.2 cu in)
- Dry weight: 39.5 kg (87 lb)

=== Components ===
- Valvetrain: One inlet and one exhaust valve per cylinder, each with double stirrup springs and push rod operated.
- Fuel system: Single carburetter standard, twin if required. Single magneto standard, dual if requested. One sparking plug per cylinder.
- Oil system: Pressure feed from double gear pump to bearings, big and little ends and valve gear, with cams spray lubricated. Oil scavenge pumped from crankcase.
- Cooling system: Air

=== Performance ===
- Power output: Normal 22 kW (30 hp) at 2,500 rpm; maximum, 24 kW (32 hp) at 2,650 rpm
- Specific power: 20 kW/L (0.72 hp/cu in)
- Compression ratio: 5.85:1
- Fuel consumption: 7.0 kg/h (16 lb/hr) at 22 kW (30 hp)
- Specific fuel consumption: 0.32 kg/(kW⋅h) (0.53 lb/(hp⋅hr)) at 22 kW (30 hp)
- Oil consumption: 0.011 kg/(kW⋅h) (0.018 lb/(hp⋅hr))
- Power-to-weight ratio: 0.60 kW/kg (0.37 hp/lb)
