= Kroeber M4 =

1930s German two-stroke piston engine

M4 Köller
- National origin: Germany
- Manufacturer: Dr. Kroeber & Sohn G.m.b.H.
- First run: 1930s
- Major applications: Möller Stomo 3, ITS-8

The Kroeber M4 Köller was a 2-stroke air-cooled horizontally opposed piston engine designed and built by Dr. Kroeber & Sohn G.m.b.H. in Germany in the late 1930s. The M4 proved relatively popular, for powering the ultra-light aircraft and motor-gliders in vogue during the 1920s and 1930s.

== Variants ==
Kroeber M3 Köller
either a typo or a variant of the M4, (only reference is Cynk's Polish aircraft 1893-1939)
Kroeber M4 Köller
Main production variant

== Applications ==
Data from AEHS: HOAE Kroeber

- Grunau Motor-Baby – German motor-glider conversion of a Grunau Baby
- Kocjan Bąk I – Polish motorglider
- Dittmar Condor 'La Falda' (a removable power-egg with M4 and pusher propeller)
- Möller Stomo 3 – German high-speed ultralight aircraft
- Akaflieg München Mü13M Motormerlin
- ITS-8 – Polish motorglider sic Kroeber M3 Köller (only reference to M3)

== Engines on display ==
There are several M4 engines on display, but one of the best preserved and presented is at the Polish Aviation Museum in Kraków.

== Specifications (M4) ==
Data from Flugzeug-Typenbuch. Handbuch der deutschen Luftfahrt- und Zubehör-Industrie 1944,

=== General characteristics ===
- Type: 2-cylinder 2-stroke air-cooled horizontally-opposed
- Bore: 75 mm (2.95 in)
- Stroke: 72 mm (2.83 in)
- Displacement: 0.634 L (38.69 cu in)
- Length: 550 mm (21.7 in)
- Width: 550 mm (21.7 in)
- Height: 646 mm (25.4 in)
- Dry weight: 27.8 kg (61 lb)

=== Components ===
- Fuel system: 2x Meco S1/f carburetor
- Fuel type: 1:25 SAE 50 oil / gasoline blend
- Oil system: blended with fuel
- Cooling system: air-cooled

=== Performance ===
- Power output:

- 18 PS (18 hp; 13 kW) at 2,700 rpm (30 minutes) at sea level
- 16.6 PS (16 hp; 12 kW) at 2,650 rpm (max. continuous / cruise) at sea level

- Specific power: 28.4 PS/L (0.46 hp/cu in; 20.89 kW/L)
- Compression ratio: 6.2:1
- Specific fuel consumption: 0.228 kg/PSh (0.510 lb/(hp⋅h); 0.310 kg/kWh) at max continuous
- Oil consumption: 0.002–0.003 kg/PSh (0.004–0.007 lb/(hp⋅h); 0.003–0.004 kg/kWh) at max continuous
- Power-to-weight ratio: 0.645 PS/kg (0.289 hp/lb; 0.474 kW/kg)
- B.M.E.P.: 2.55 atm (2.58 bar; 37.5 psi)
