= JATO =

Type of aircraft assisted take-off

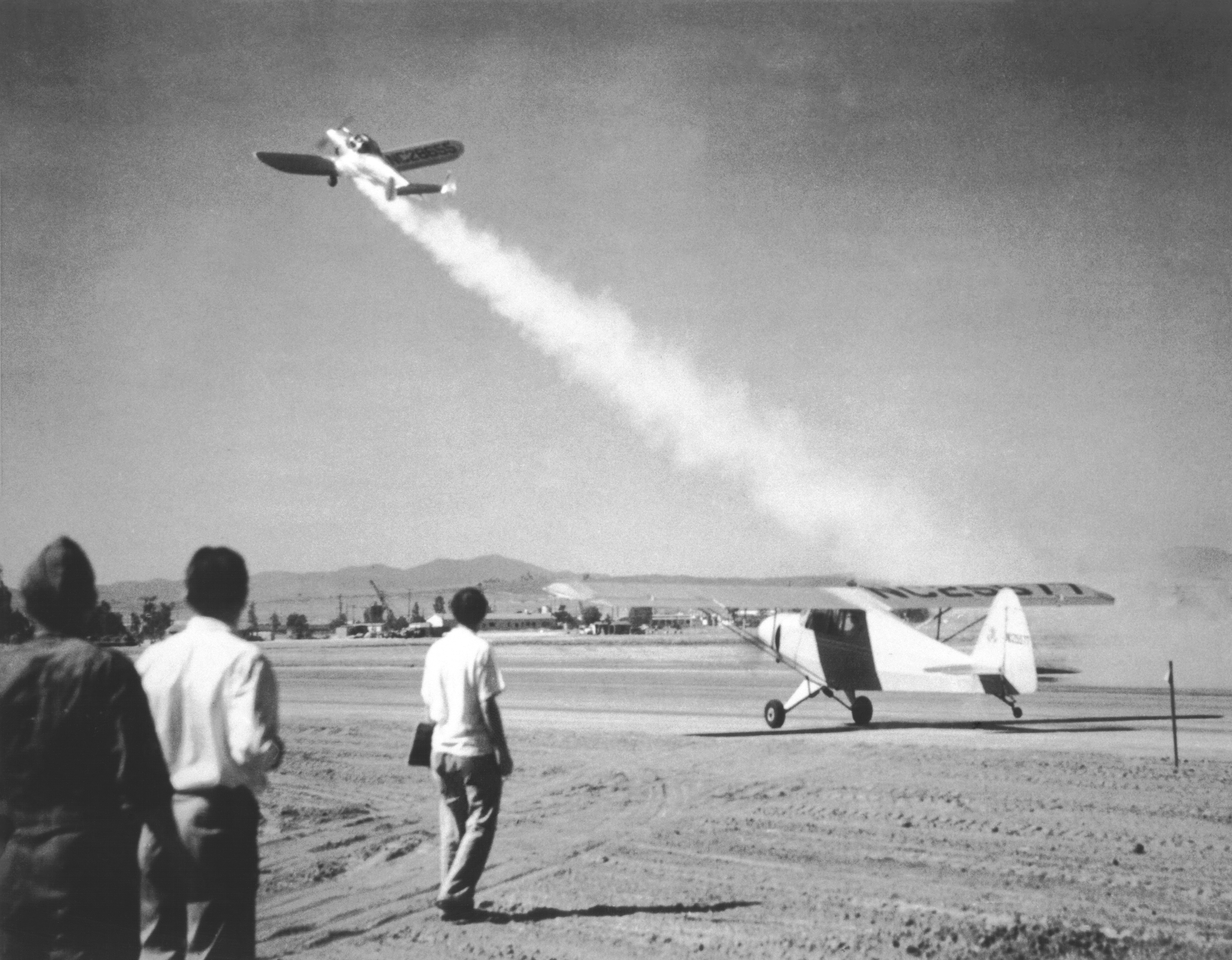
The first "rocket-assisted" take-off in the United States, a GALCIT booster fitted to an ERCO Ercoupe, at March Field, California, 1941

JATO (acronym for jet-assisted take-off) is a type of assisted take-off for helping overloaded aircraft into the air by providing additional thrust in the form of small rockets. The term JATO is used interchangeably with the (more specific) term RATO, for rocket-assisted take-off (or, in RAF parlance, RATOG, for rocket-assisted take-off gear).

== Early experiments and World War II ==
In 1927 the Soviet research and development laboratory Gas Dynamics Laboratory developed solid-propellant rockets to assist aircraft take-off and in 1931 the world's first successful use of rockets to assist take-off of aircraft were carried out on a U-1, the Soviet designation for an Avro 504 trainer, which achieved about one hundred successful assisted takeoffs. Successful assisted takeoffs were also achieved on the Tupolev TB-1. and Tupolev TB-3 Heavy Bombers. The official test of the Tupolev TB-1 in 1933 shortened the takeoff by 77% when using the rockets.

Early experiments using rockets to boost gliders into the air were conducted in Germany in the 1920s (Lippisch Ente), and later both the Royal Air Force and the Luftwaffe introduced such systems in World War II. The British system used fairly large solid fuel rockets to shoot planes (typically the Hawker Hurricane) off a small ramp fitted to the fronts of merchant ships, known in service as catapult armed merchantmen (or CAM Ships), in order to provide some cover against German maritime patrol planes. After firing, the rocket was released from the back of the plane to fall into the water and sink. The task done, the pilot would fly to friendly territory if possible or parachute from the plane, hopefully to be picked up by one of the escort vessels. Over two years the system was only employed nine times to attack German aircraft with eight kills recorded for the loss of a single pilot.

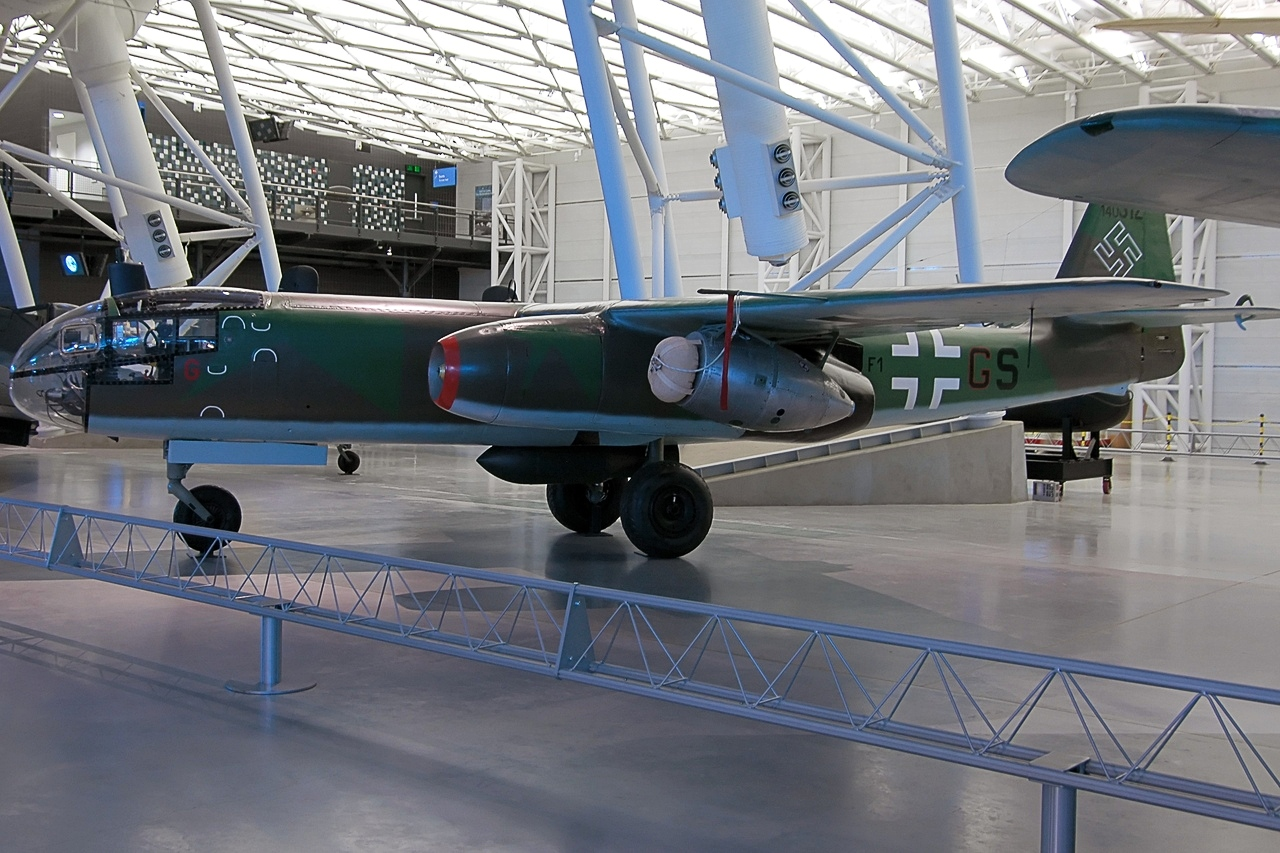
A German Arado 234 Blitz fitted with Starthilfe RATO units

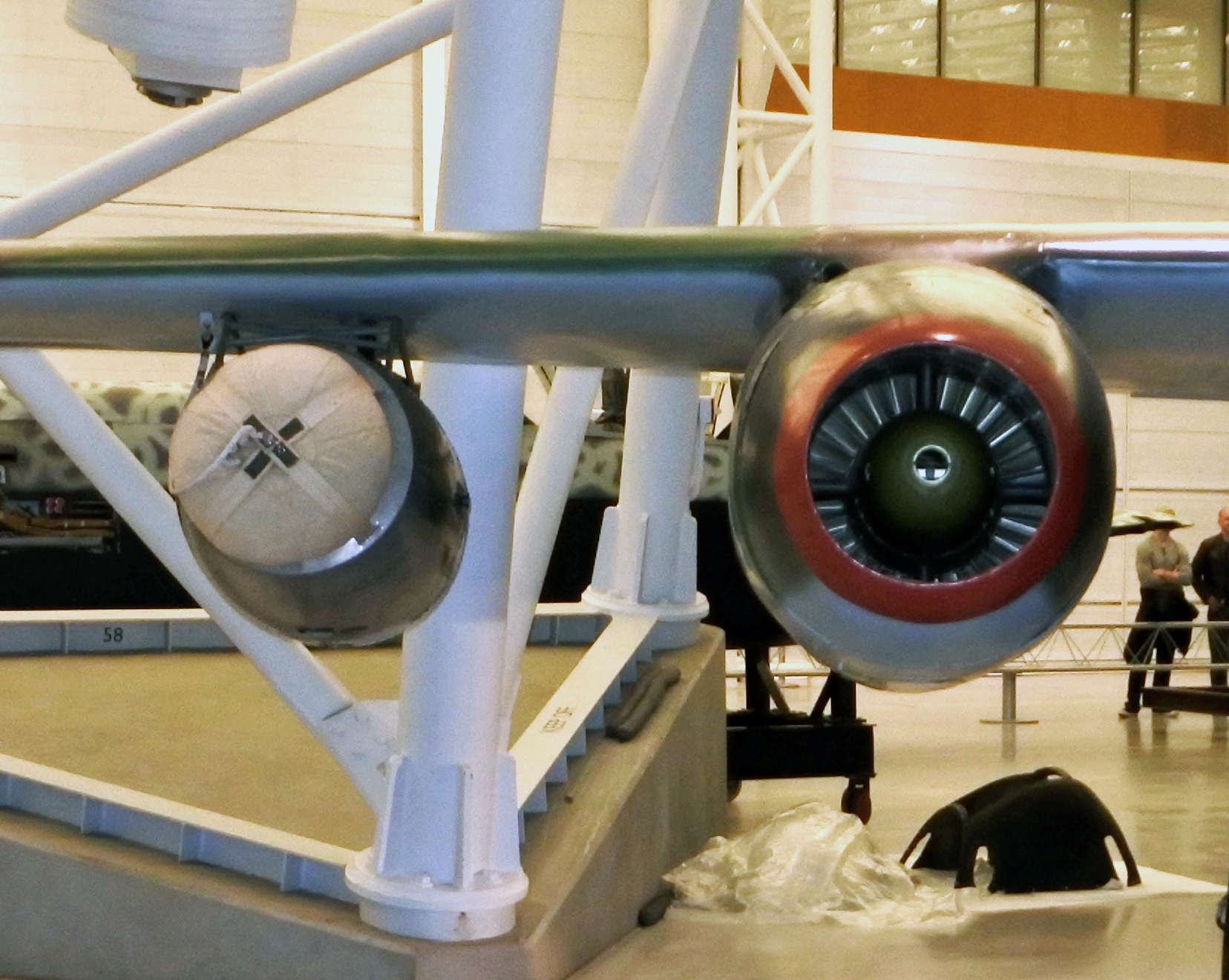
Starthilfe RATO (left) on the starboard wing of Arado Ar 234 B-2 at the Steven F. Udvar-Hazy Center in Virginia.

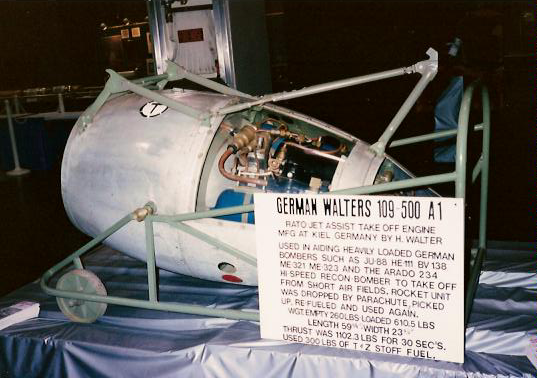
The Starthilfe RATO unit

The Luftwaffe also used the technique with both liquid-fueled units made by the Walter firm and BMW – and solid fuel, themselves made both by the Schmidding and WASAG firms – as both firmly attached and jettisonable rocket motors, to get airborne more quickly and with shorter takeoff runs. These were used to boost the takeoff performance of their medium bombers, and the enormous 55-meter wingspan Gigant, Messerschmitt Me 321 glider, conceived in 1940 for the invasion of Britain, and used to supply the Russian front. The enormous Me 321s originally had air tow assistance from up to three Messerschmitt Bf 110 heavy fighters in a so-called Troika-Schlepp arrangement into the air with loads that would have made the takeoff run too long otherwise, but with much attendant risk of aerial collision from the trio of vee-formation Bf 110s involved in a simultaneous towplane function, meant to be greatly eased with the substitution of the trio of Bf 110s with a single example of the unusual, twin-fuselage Heinkel He 111Z purpose-designed five-engined towplane. The use of rocket-assisted takeoff methods became especially important late in the war when the lengths of usable runways were severely curtailed due to the results of Allied bombing. Their system typically used jettisonable, self-contained Walter HWK 109-500 Starthilfe ("takeoff-help"), also known as "Rauchgerät" – smoke generator, unitized liquid-fuel monopropellant rocket booster units whose engines driven by chemical decomposition of "T-Stoff", essentially almost pure hydrogen peroxide, with a Z-Stoff catalytic compound. A parachute pack at the blunt-contour front of the motor's exterior housing was used to slow its fall after being released from the plane, so the system could be re-used. First experiments were held in 1937 on a Heinkel He 111, piloted by test-pilot Erich Warsitz at Neuhardenberg, a large field about 70 kilometres east of Berlin, listed as a reserve airfield in the event of war. Other German experiments with JATO were aimed at assisting the launch of interceptor aircraft such as the Messerschmitt Me 262C, as the Heimatschützer special versions, usually fitted with either a version of the Walter HWK 109-509 liquid fuelled rocket engine from the Me 163 Komet program either in the extreme rear of the fuselage or semi-"podded" beneath it just behind the wing's trailing edge, to assist its Junkers Jumo 004 turbojets, or a pair of specially rocket-boosted BMW 003R combination jet-rocket powerplants in place of the Jumo 004s, so that the Me 262C Heimatschützer interceptors could reach enemy bomber formations sooner. Two prototypes of the Heimatschützer versions of the Me 262 were built and test flown, of the three designs proposed. In contrast to the wide variety of aircraft types that the HWK-designed Starthilfe modular liquid monopropellant booster designs were tested with, seeing some degree of front-line use; the aforementioned solid-fueled RATO booster designs from both the Schmidding and WASAG firms remained almost strictly experimental in nature, with the Schmidding 500 kg thrust solid-fueled booster units intended to see service, a quartet mounted per airframe for use with the radical Bachem Ba 349 VTO rocket interceptor design in 1945, for its vertical launch needs. The strictly experimental, HWK 109-501 Starthilfe RATO system used a similar bi-propellant "hot" motor to that on the Me 163B Komet rocket fighter, adding a 20 kg mass of a combination of B-stoff hydrazine, mixed with "Br-stoff" (ligroin hydrocarbon distillate) for a main "fuel" to the T-Stoff monopropellant still destabilized with the Z-Stoff permanganate for ignition as the oxidizer, tripling the 109-500's thrust figure of 4.95 kN (at 14.71 kN/1,500 kgf) with a burn of 30 second duration. Due to the "hot" system's similar risks demanding similar special fueling and handling procedures to that of the Komet's 509A rocket motor, the 109-501 seems to have remained a strictly experimental design, only being used for the test flights of the Junkers Ju 287 V1 prototype jet bomber.

In early 1939, the National Academy of Sciences in the United States provided $1,000 to Theodore von Kármán and the Rocket Research Group (including Jack Parsons, Frank Malina, Edward Forman and Apollo M. O. Smith) at the Guggenheim Aeronautical Laboratory at the California Institute of Technology (GALCIT) to research rocket-assisted take-off of aircraft. This JATO research was the first rocket research to receive financial assistance from the U.S. government since World War I when Robert H. Goddard had an Army contract to develop solid fuel rocket weapons. In late 1941 von Kármán and his team attached several 50-pound thrust, solid fuel Aerojet JATOs to an Ercoupe, and Army Captain Homer Boushey took off on test runs. On the last run they removed the propeller, attached six JATO units under the wings, and Boushey was thrust into the air for a short flight, the first American to fly by rocket power only. Both armed services used solid fuel JATO during the war.

== Post WWII ==
LC-130 cargo plane RATO takeoff from snow

After World War II JATO was often used to overcome the poor thrust of early jet engines at low speeds or for assisting heavily loaded aircraft to take off. For example, the propeller engined Avro Shackleton, when heavily laden with fuel for long maritime surveillance flights, relied on Armstrong Siddeley Viper turbojets for takeoff.

The world's first jet airliner, the de Havilland DH 106 Comet, included a design provision to carry two hydrogen peroxide–powered de Havilland Sprite booster rockets intended to be installed for "hot and high" conditions from airports such as Khartoum and Nairobi. These were tested on thirty flights, but the de Havilland Ghost jet engines alone were considered powerful enough and some airlines concluded that rocket motors were impractical. Nevertheless, Sprite fittings were retained on production Comet 1s but were rendered unnecessary with subsequent engine upgrades.

In the late 1950s, zero-length launch experimental programs for launching fighter aircraft were carried out by the United States Air Force, the German Air Force and the Soviet Air Forces using high-thrust, short-burn duration booster designs of similar appearance and function. The USAF used a modified Republic F-84, designated EF-84G, which used the MGM-1 Matador cruise missile's Aerojet General–designed, 240 kN (26 short ton) thrust-level solid fuel booster of two second thrust duration. The Soviet VVS used a modified MiG-19 fighter, designated SM-30, launched from a special launcher, and using a nearly identical solid-fueled rocket booster design to that of the EF-84G, but of a much more powerful, 600 kN (64 short ton) thrust level. The F-100 and F-104 were also used for zero-length launch experiments, with similarly powerful drop-away booster units to the Soviets' SM-30 experiments.

Also in the 1950s the JATO Junior was an attempt by Aerojet Engineering to introduce smaller JATO units to small commercial aircraft, but was blocked by the U.S. Navy Bureau of Aeronautics. Aerojet claimed that the smaller JATO bottle, delivering 250 pounds of thrust for 12 seconds could help a light private plane, that normally requires almost 900 ft (270 m) of runway to clear a 50 ft (15 m) high obstacle, could do the same with 300 ft (91 m) of runway with a JATO Jr unit. JATO Junior bottles mounted to the engine nacelles were briefly offered as a factory option on the Beechcraft Twin Bonanza; they were promoted not as a takeoff aid, but rather as a means to extend glide distance during a forced landing in unfavorable terrain. However, it is not known whether the bottles were ever actually installed on a production Twin Bonanza or used in any instance other than factory test flights. Junior JATO was also offered as an option on Beech 18s and the 104 lb (47 kg) system was installed on 64 aircraft.

The Boeing 727 had provision for Aerojet JATO assist for use in "hot and high" conditions, particularly at Mexico City and La Paz. A JATO option was available for the Fairchild Swearingen Metroliner to increase take-off weight while maintaining one-engine inoperative climb requirements.

In late 1980 the United States military operation plan Operation Credible Sport was intended to rescue hostages held by Iran using C-130 cargo planes modified with rocket engines to enable a very short take off and landing. The plan was canceled after an accident occurred during a test landing when the forward-facing JATO units designed to slow the aircraft fired before the downward-facing units (designed to cushion the landing) did, causing the aircraft to crash-land.

JATO became largely unnecessary as the take-off thrust of jet engines improved and is now rarely used even when operating heavily laden from short runways or in "hot and high" conditions. It is occasionally used in exceptional circumstances, on specially equipped, mostly military, aircraft.

== Urban legend ==
The JATO Rocket Car is an urban legend that relates the story of a car equipped with JATO units that is later found smashed into a mountainside. This story is often given as an example of a Darwin Award; it appears to be apocryphal, with no basis in fact.

The legend has been examined several times on the Discovery Channel show MythBusters. For the first attempt, in a 2003 pilot episode, the crew replicated the scene and the thrust of the JATO with some commercially available amateur rocket motors. The car did go very fast, outrunning the chase helicopter, but nowhere near the 300 mph (500 km/h) reported in the original story, and failed to become airborne. The myth was revisited in 2007, using a different configuration of rockets in an attempt to make the car fly; it exploded before reaching the end of its launch ramp. The myth was again revisited in 2013 in the 1st episode of Mythbusters Season 12, as a celebration of their 10th year on the air.

A JATO-equipped 1958 Dodge Coronet car on the El Mirage dry lake was used for a TV advertisement to demonstrate the power of their "total contact" brakes. This was broadcast during The Lawrence Welk Show in the late 1950s.

== Gallery ==
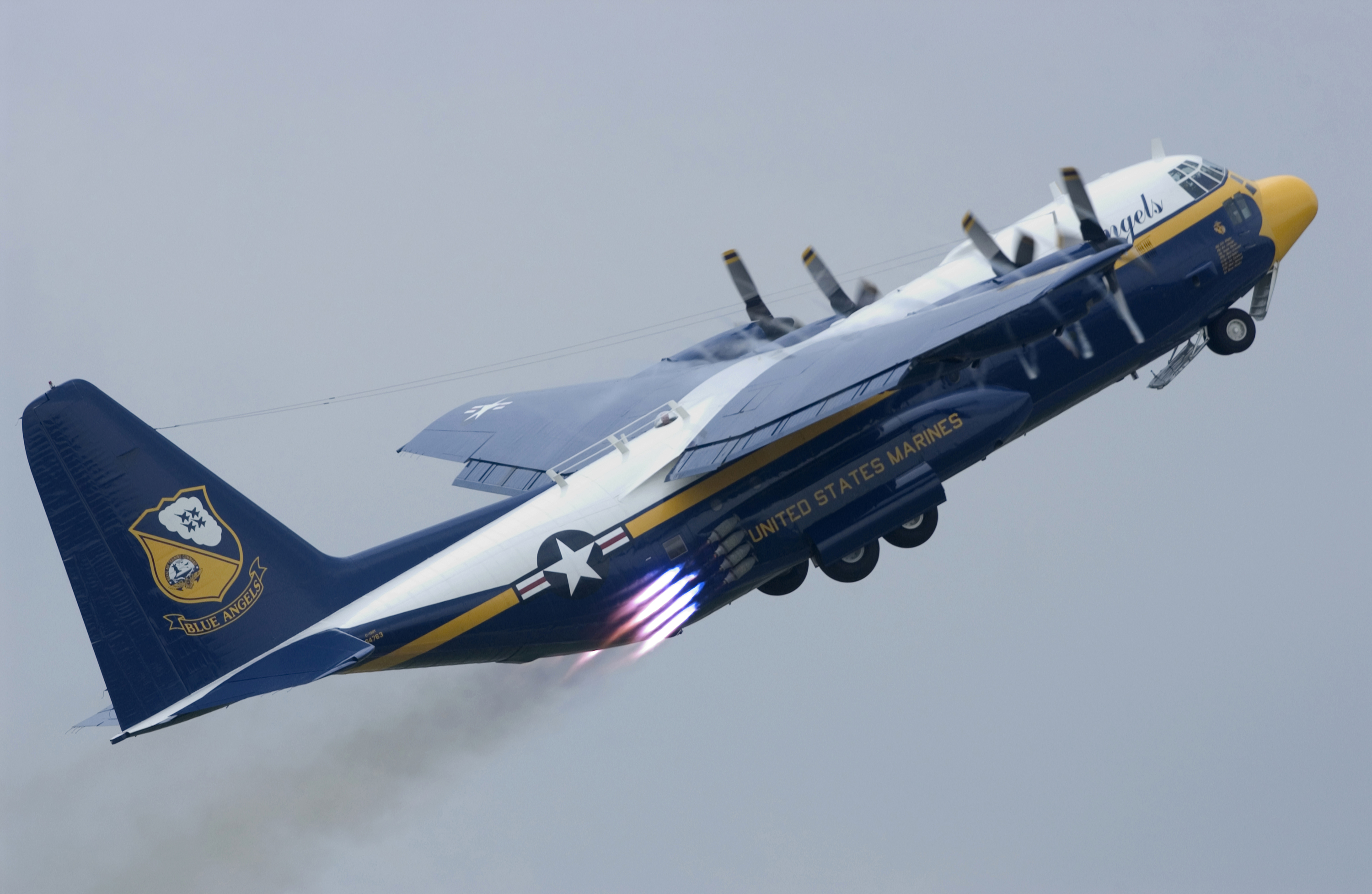
The US Navy's Blue Angels C-130 Hercules "Fat Albert" using JATO during takeoff

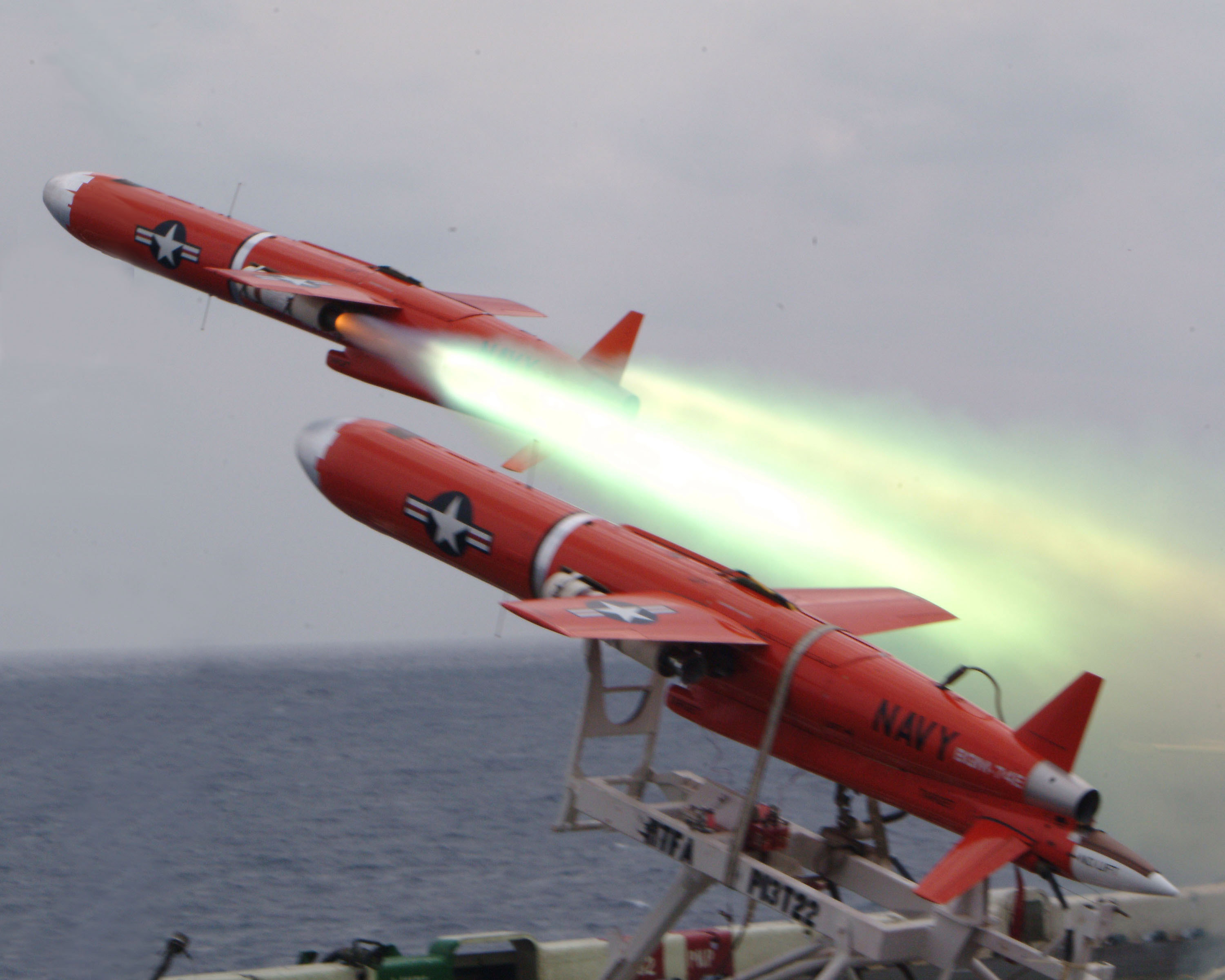
BQM-74E Chukar target drone using JATO

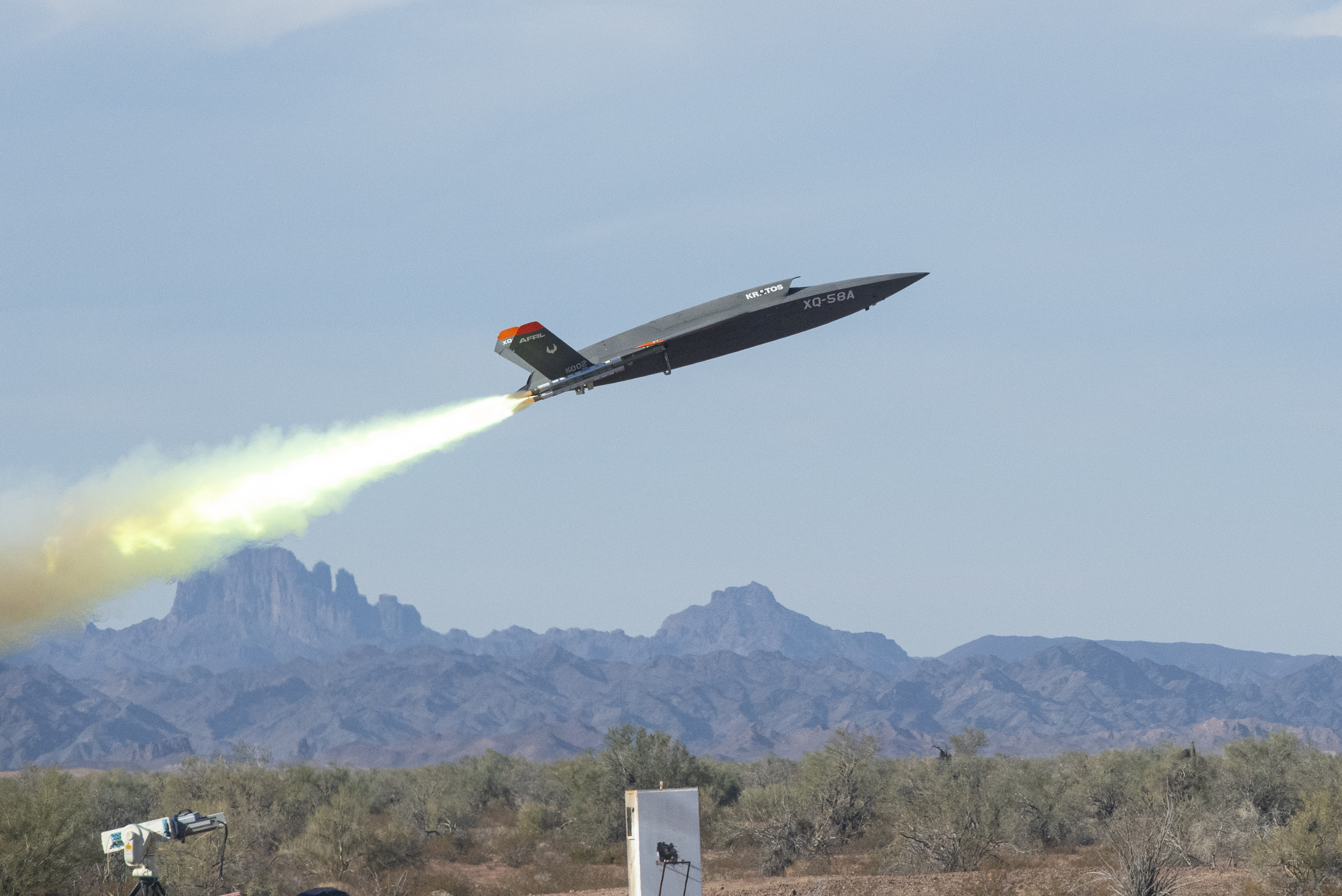
Zero-length launch: XQ-58 Valkyrie taking off from Laguna Army Airfield.

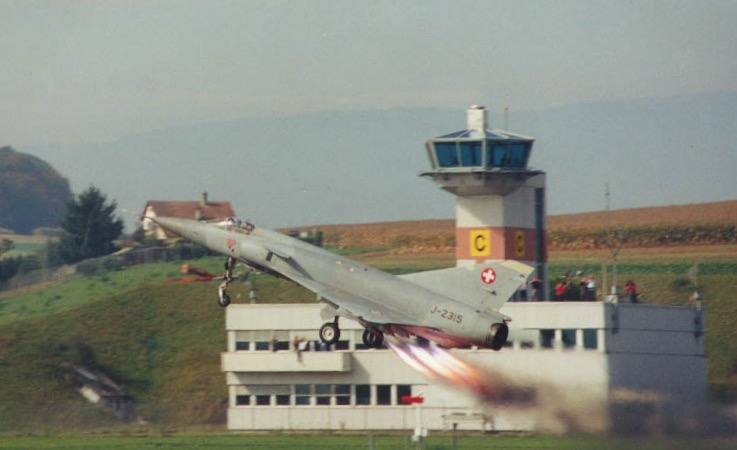
Swiss Air Force's Dassault Mirage IIIs in Payerne

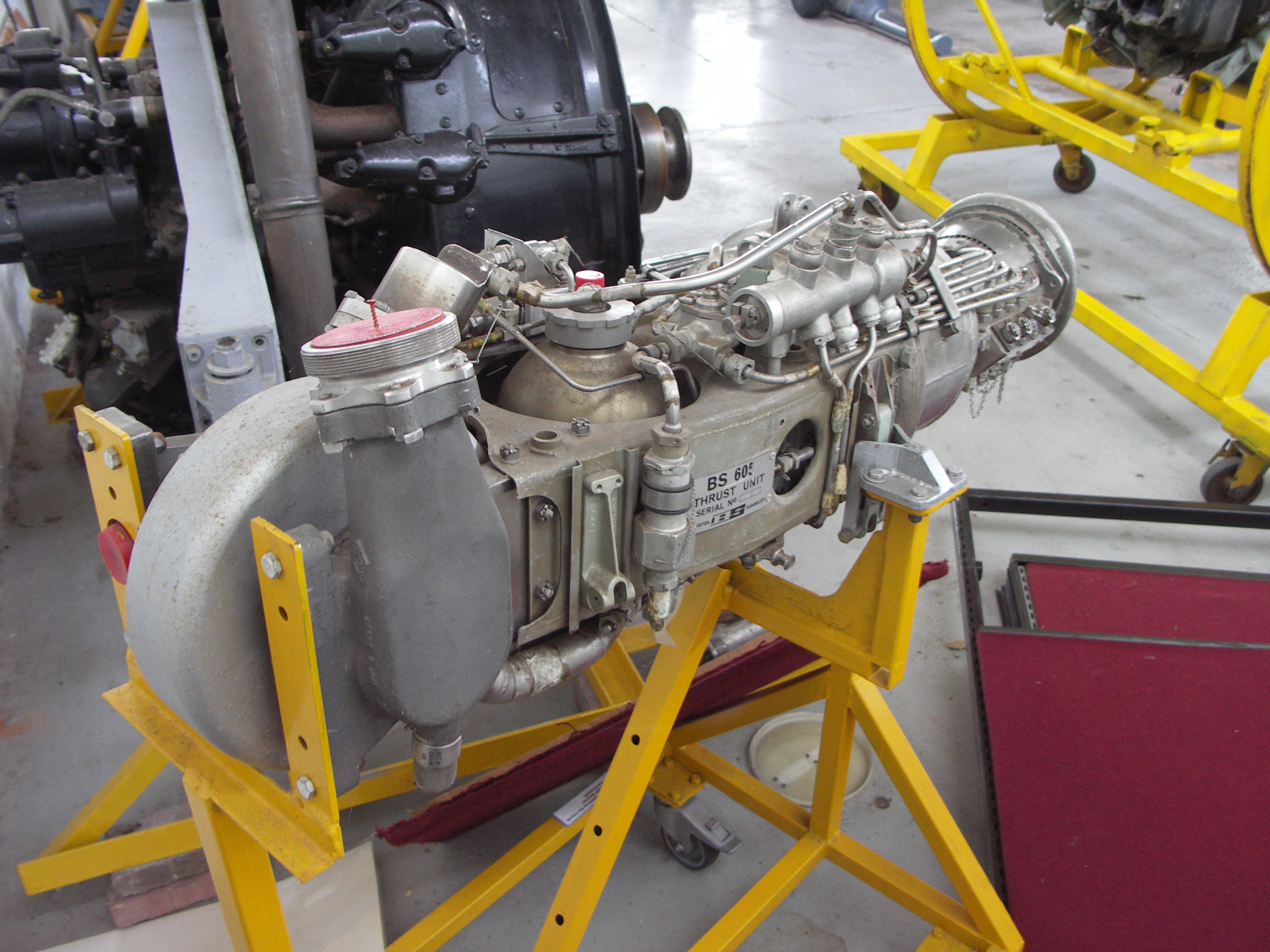
BS.605 as used by the Buccaneer S.50

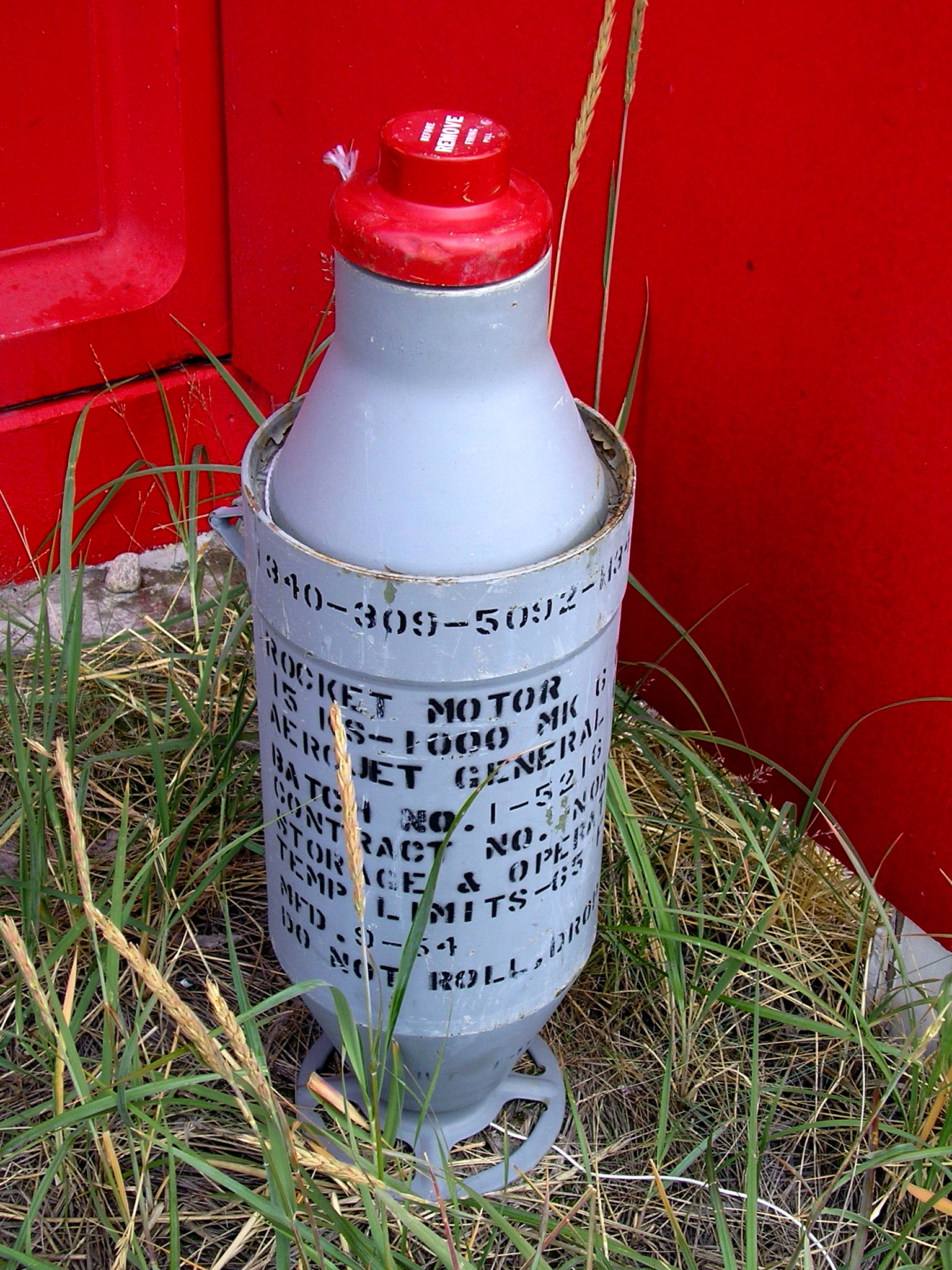
A RATO bottle

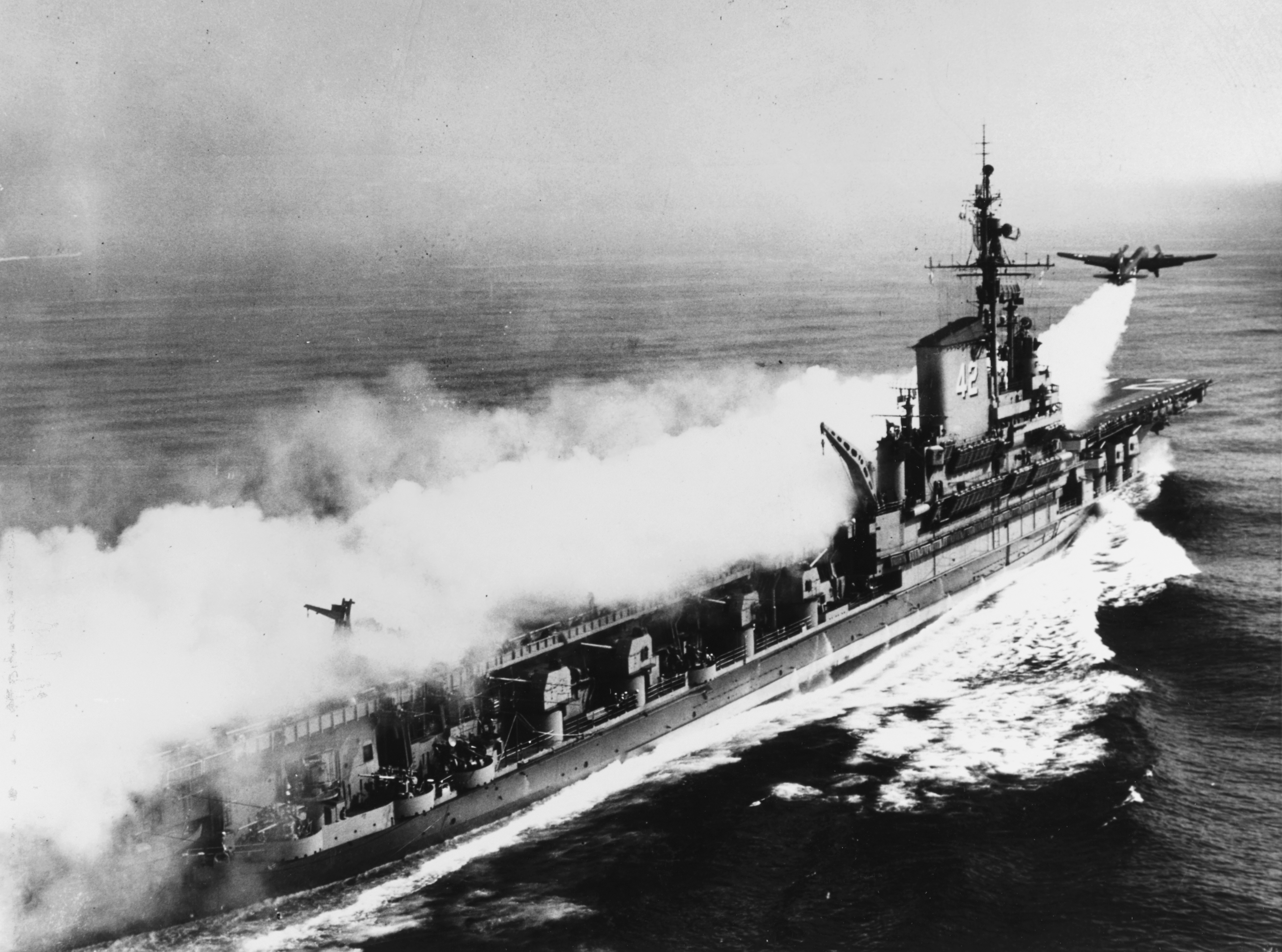
A Lockheed P-2 Neptune launches from the aircraft carrier USS Franklin D. Roosevelt (CV-42), 2 July 1951.

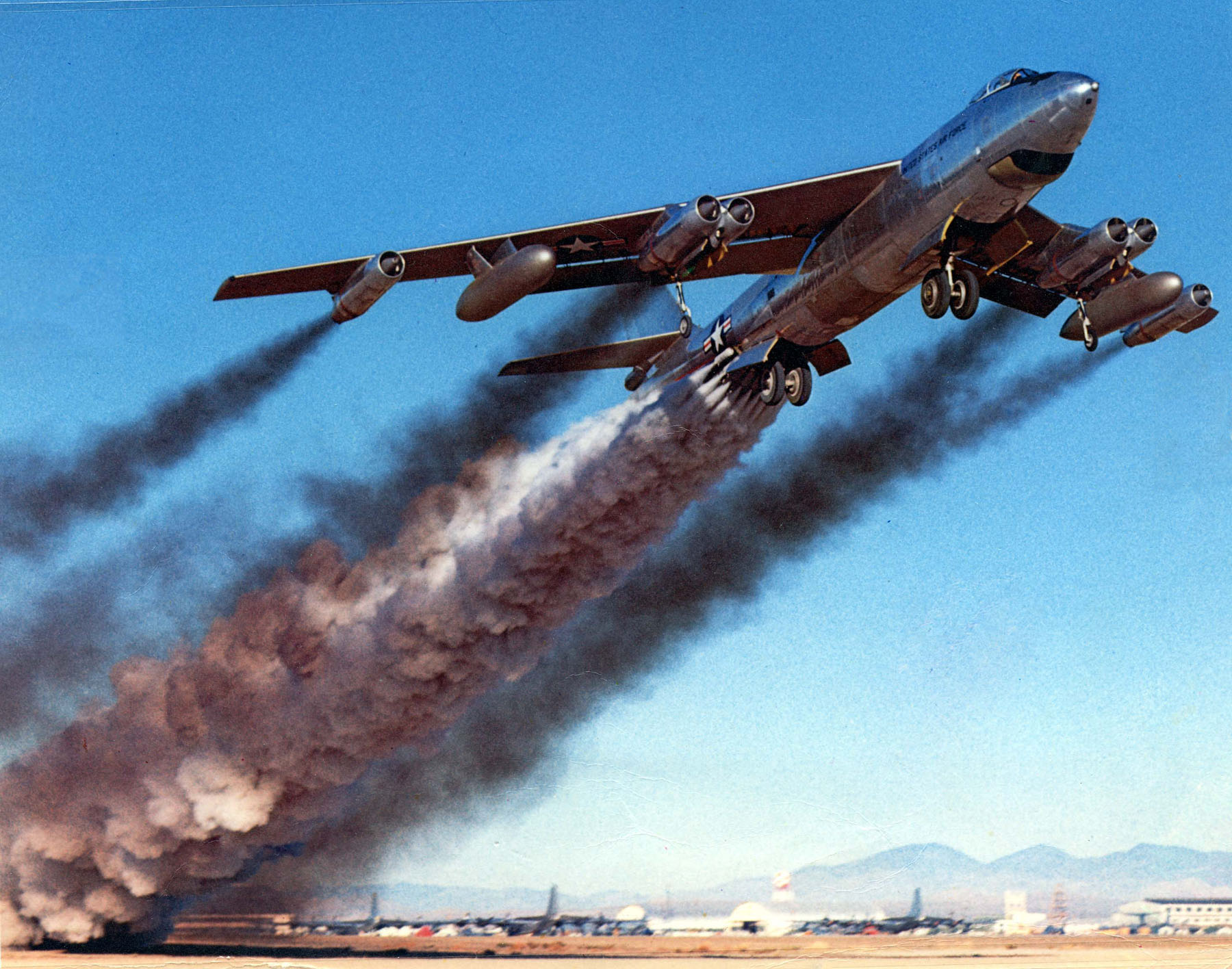
A rocket-assisted Boeing B-47B takeoff.

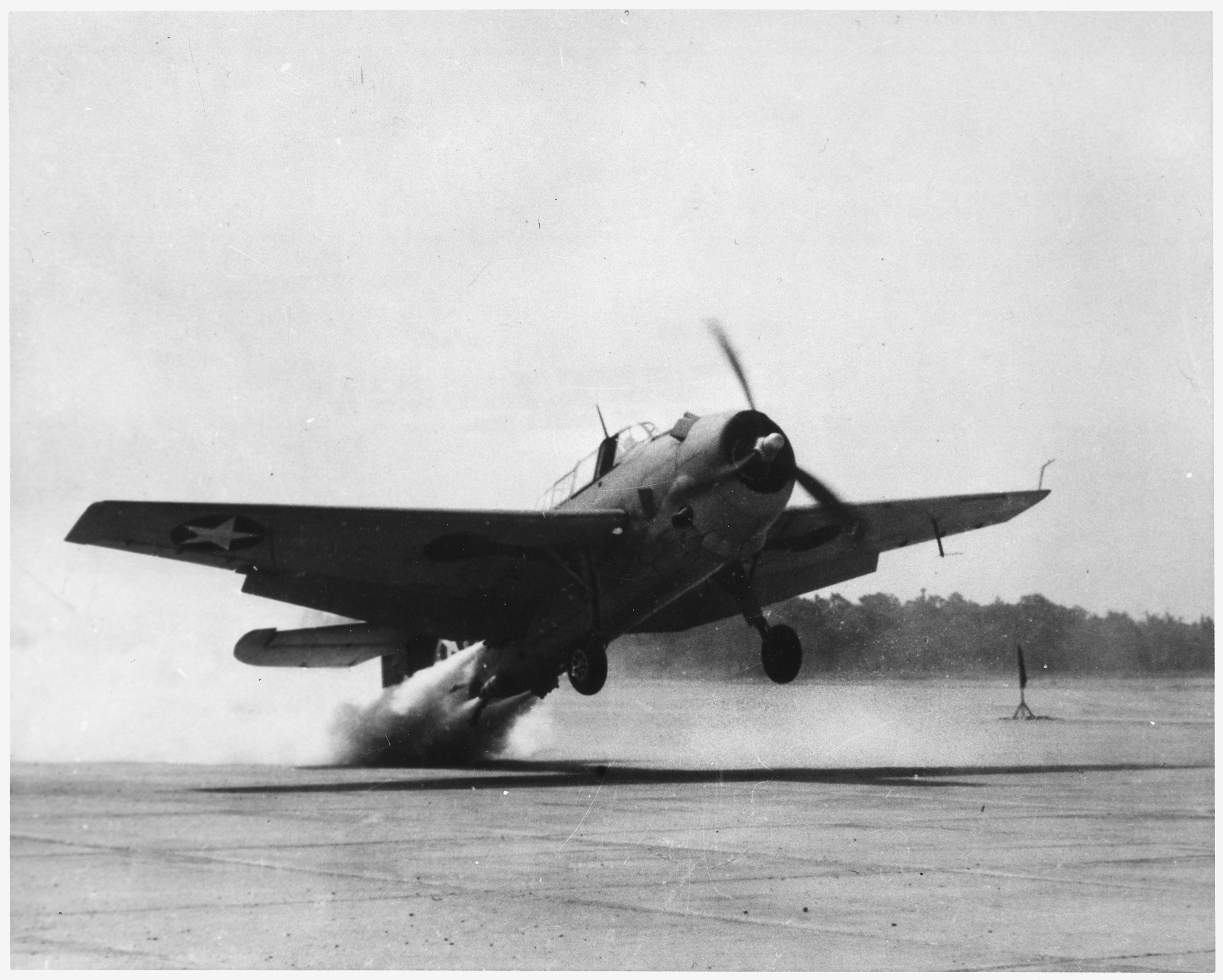
A Grumman TBF Avenger torpedo bomber taking off with the aid of 330 horsepower (250 kW) jet-assisted unit in about half the normal run.

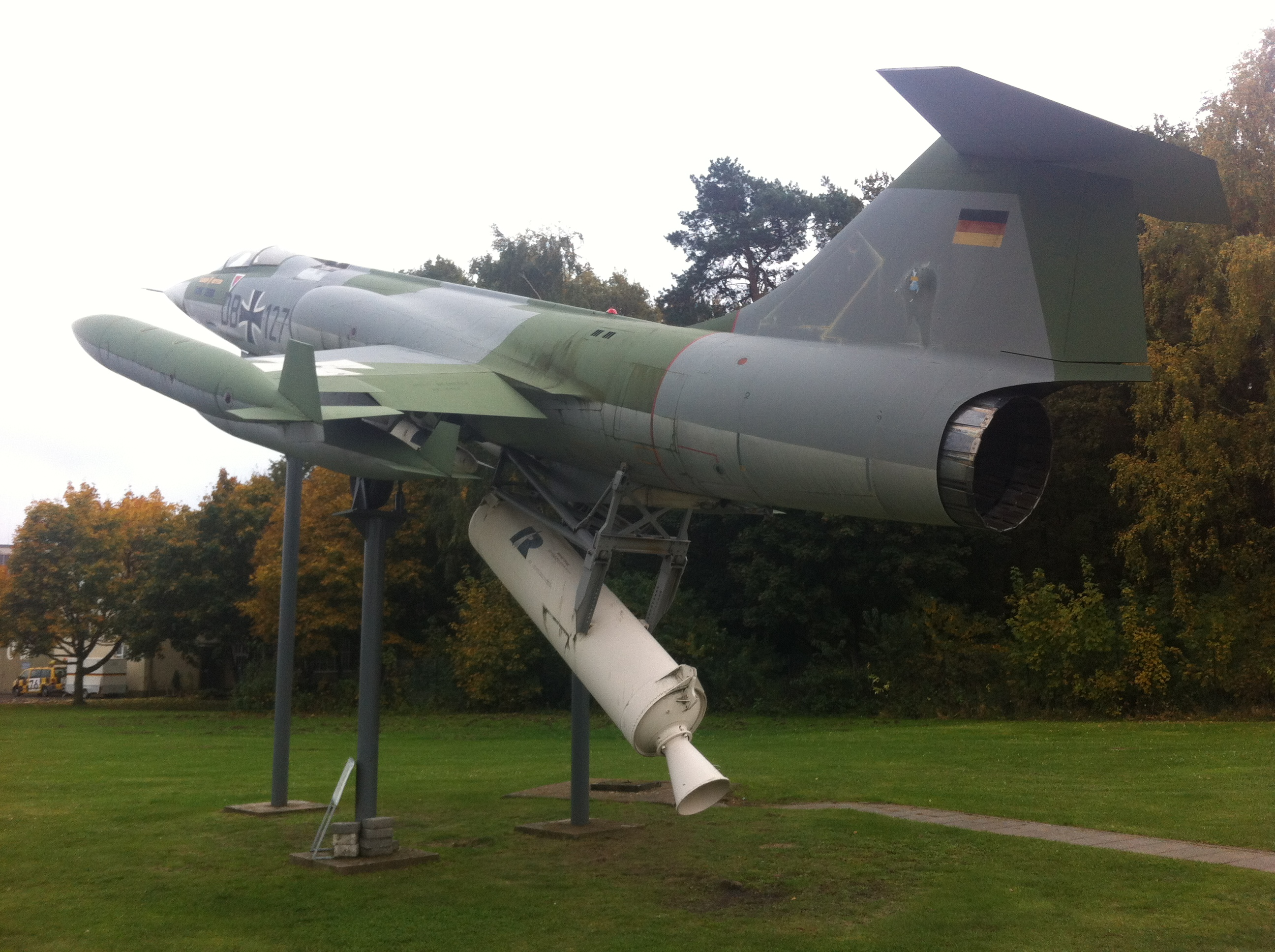
F-104G with an experimental ZELL rocket booster at Gatow.

== See also ==
- Zero-length launch
- CAM ship
