= List of stoffs =

WWII German codes for fuels and oxidizers

During World War II, Germany fielded many aircraft and rockets whose fuels, and oxidizers, were designated (letter)-Stoff (pronounced [ʃtɔf]). The following list of stoffs refers to the World War II aerospace meanings if not noted otherwise.

== Meaning of stoff ==
The German word Stoff (plural Stoffe), like the English word stuff, derives from Old French estoffe, however the meanings are somewhat different. Stoff has a fairly broad range of meanings, including "chemical substance" or "matter", "fuel" and "cloth", depending on the context. The German names of the common elements hydrogen, oxygen and nitrogen are Wasserstoff, Sauerstoff and Stickstoff ("hydrogen" being a scientific Greek neologism for "constituent of water", "oxygen" for "constituent of acids", "nitrogen" for "constituent of nitre", i.e. saltpeter - although the German root stick- is derived from ersticken, "to smother, suffocate", referring to its property of not supporting combustion and respiration). Stoff was used in chemical code names in both world wars. Some code names were reused between the wars and had different meanings at different times; for example, T-Stoff meant a rocket propellant in World War II, but a tear gas (xylyl bromide) in World War I.

== List ==
- A-Stoff (World War I): chloroacetone (tear gas)
- A-Stoff (World War II): liquid oxygen (LOX)
- B-Stoff (short for Brennstoff, literally, "fuel"): the 75% ethanol / 25% water fuel used in the V-2 ballistic rocket The word was also used for hydrazine, or a mixture of hydrazine in methyl alcohol, (used in the Messerschmitt Me 163 Komet rocket powered fighter aircraft).
- Bn-Stoff (World War I): bromomethyl ethyl ketone, homomartonite (tear gas)
- Br-Stoff: Ligroin extracted from crude gasoline
- C-Stoff: 57% methanol / 30% hydrazine / 13% water / small amount of Catalyst 431 potassium-cuprous cyanide coordination complex
- F-Stoff: titanium tetrachloride (smoke producing compound)
- K-Stoff (World War I): mixture of chloromethyl chloroformate and dimethyl chloroformate (tear gas)
- M-Stoff: methanol
- N-Stoff: chlorine trifluoride
- P-Stoff: Compressed nitrogen or compressed air used for preparing a V-2 missile for launch from its Meillerwagen transporter/erector trailer
- R-Stoff or Tonka: 57% xylidine / 43% triethylamine
- S-Stoff: 90% nitric acid / 10% sulfuric acid or 96% nitric acid / 4% ferric chloride (The ferric chloride acted as a catalyst.)
- SV-Stoff or Salbei (sage): 94% nitric acid / 6% dinitrogen tetroxide or 85% nitric acid / 15% sulfuric acid
- T-Stoff (World War I): xylyl bromide tear gas
- T-Stoff (World War II): 80% concentrated hydrogen peroxide / small amounts of 8-Hydroxyquinoline / 20% water used as hypergolic oxidizer with C-Stoff for the HWK 109-509 A through C rocket engines, or as monopropellant or power source with Z-Stoff for the HWK 109-500 Starthilfe RATO and HWK 109-507 ASM rocket booster pods
- U-Stoff: dinitrogen tetroxide
- X-Stoff: tetranitromethane
- XU-Stoff: 70% (by weight) X-Stoff (tetranitromethane) / 30% (by weight) U-Stoff (dinitrogen tetroxide)
- Z-Stoff: calcium permanganate / sodium permanganate / water
