= Arado E.381 =

German WWII aircraft

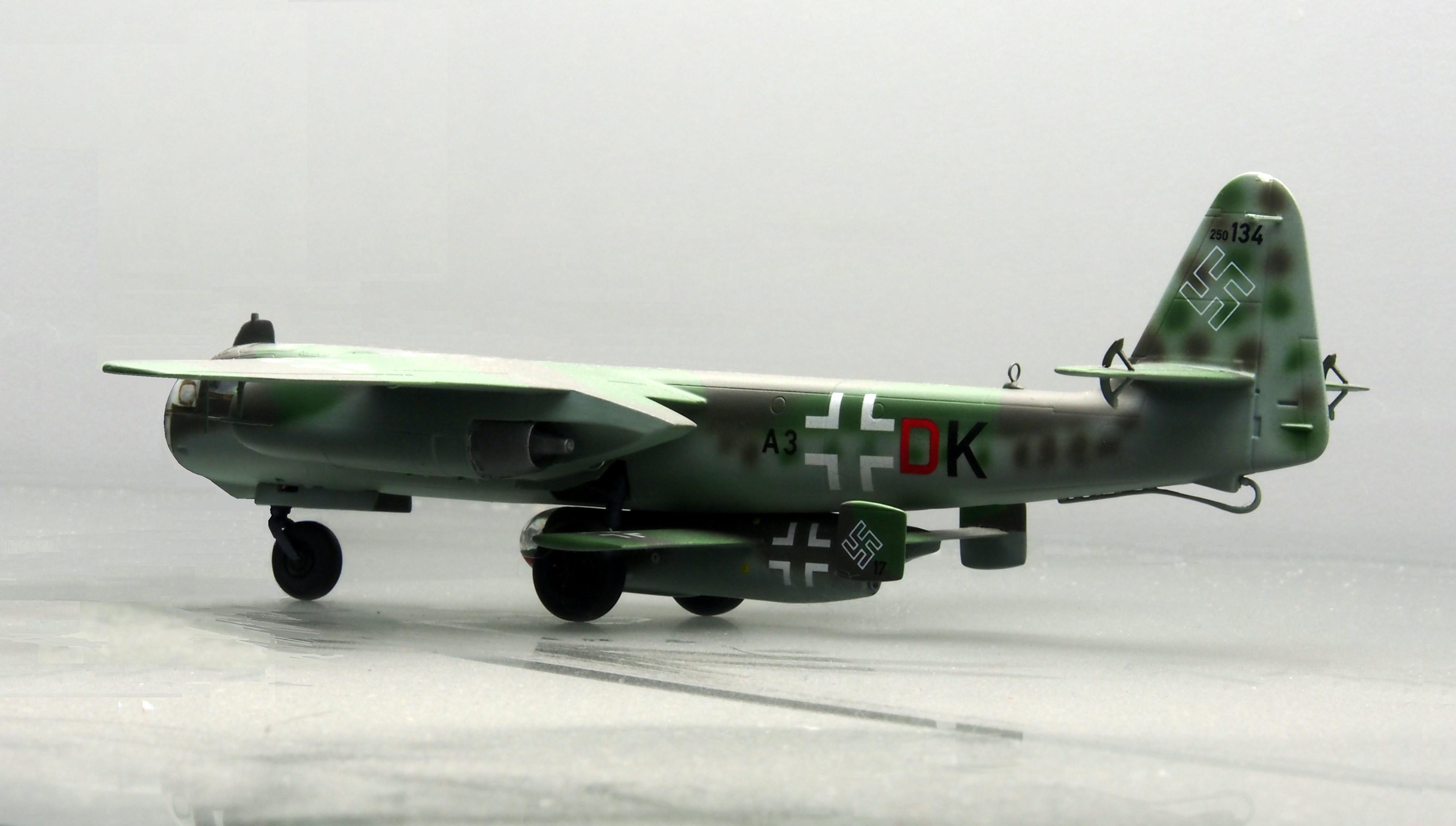
- Model of an Arado Ar 234 V21 carrying an Arado E.381 at the Technikmuseum Speyer

General information
- Type: Parasite fighter
- National origin: Germany
- Manufacturer: Arado
- Status: Abandoned
- Primary user: Luftwaffe
- Number built: 0 powered aircraft, 4 unmanned wooden airframes.

The Arado E.381 (Kleinstjäger – "smallest fighter") was a proposed parasite fighter aircraft. Conceived by Arado Flugzeugwerke in December 1944 for Germany's Luftwaffe during World War II, the E.381 was to have been carried aloft by and launched from an Arado Ar 234 "mother" aircraft. It would then have activated its rocket engine, which would have propelled it to attack Allied (mainly American and British) bombers. Development was cancelled due to lack of funds and official support.

There were three proposed variants; each had fuel capacity for only two target runs, after which the pilot would have been required to glide without power to a landing on underbelly skids. To survive close pursuits, the E.381 was designed with the narrowest frontal cross-section possible to increase its chances of surviving shots from the front. This also forced the pilot to lie in a prone position. The cross-section was 0.45 square meters (4.8 sq ft), or approximately a quarter of the cross-section of the Messerschmitt Bf 109.

== Development ==
A computer-rendered image of an Arado E.381 suspended under the belly of the Ar 234C mother ship

Near the end of World War II, in December 1944, the German aircraft manufacturers Arado, BMW, Gotha, Heinkel, Henschel, and Zeppelin submitted design proposals for small rocket- or jet-powered aircraft intended for pursuit or ground-attack duties. All these proposals exploited the Luftwaffe's concept of "gaining a tactical advantage by placing excessive stress on the man in the cockpit (the German pilot)". The g-forces envisioned in these proposals were feasible for aircraft structures but exceeded human capabilities in a normal sitting position. The designers attempted to alleviate this constraint by placing the pilot in the prone position, which increased the sustainable g-force limit. This also allowed a reduction in fuselage size, weight, and drag. A smaller cross-section also decreased the likelihood of being hit by enemy gunners, and Arado exploited this opportunity to the fullest. According to their "specific design philosophy", the fighter was designed to fly close to bomber formations and open fire from its MK 108 cannon at point-blank range.

The E.381 began in a proposal from Arado Flugzeugwerke to the Air Ministry for a parasite fighter, carried underneath another aircraft, to destroy Allied bombers. Three variants of the E.381, named Mark I, II and III, were designed. Each version was essentially an armored tube provided with armament and a Walter HWK 109-509 rocket engine for power. The aircraft would have carried enough fuel for two approaches to the target as well as only sixty (some say forty-five) 30 mm (1.2 in) rounds. After using all his fuel during an attack it was intended that the pilot would glide the fighter to the ground, deploy its drogue parachute, and land the aircraft on a primitive skid landing gear. None of the designs were ever completed due to its cancellation, though some wooden airframes and a single mockup were constructed in 1944 to provide prone-position training for pilots. The E.381 was cancelled due to a lack of funds and interest by the Ministry of Aviation, along with a scarcity of mother Ar 234 aircraft — the Arado Ar 234C four-BMW 003 jet engined aircraft intended for this purpose was never flight tested before the war's end.

== Variants ==
An "x-ray" sideview drawing of the Mark II's fuselage interior. The main features outlined are present in all versions.

Comparison table
Version/Mark	Length	Wingspan	Height	Wing area	Empty weight	Loaded weight	Wing load	Maximum speed
I	4.69 m (15.4 ft)	4.43 m (14.5 ft)	1.29 m (4.2 ft)	5 m^{2} (54 ft^{2})	830 kg (1,830 lb)	1,200 kg (2,600 lb)	240 kg/m^{2} (49.1 lb/ft^{2})	900 km/h (560 mph)
II	4.95 m (16.2 ft)	5 m (16 ft)	1.15 m (3.8 ft)	5 m^{2} (54 ft^{2})	0 kg (0 lb)	1,265 kg (2,789 lb)	235 kg/m^{2} (51.8 lb/ft^{2})	885 km/h (550 mph)
III	5.7 m (19 ft)	5.05 m (16.6 ft)	1.51 m (5.0 ft)	5.5 m^{2} (59 ft^{2})	0 kg (0 lb)	1,500 kg (3,300 lb)	272 kg/m^{2} (55.8 lb/ft^{2})	895 km/h (556 mph)

=== Arado E.381/I ===
Arado E.381/I

The first design, the Mark I, had a fuselage with a circular cross-section and a small round window in the nose for pilot vision. A 5-millimeter (0.20 in) armored shell protected most of the fuselage. The pilot would have been in a prone position in the very cramped cockpit (the cross-section was 0.45 square meters (4.8 sq ft), or approximately a quarter of the cross-section of the Messerschmitt Bf 109. (Note: This figure is from Arado. The Bf 109 had a cross-section of 1.8 square meters (19 sq ft))) behind a removable 140-millimeter (5.5 in) bullet-resistant glass screen mounted in front of the pilot. Two small bulges were located on the sides of the fuselage for the pilot's elbows. Three C-Stoff tanks surrounded the pilot, with the T-Stoff oxidizer tank in the center section between the pilot and the engine. The aircraft had straight wings, mounted at the top of the aircraft. In the dorsal area (at the wing mounts), the fuselage humped to accommodate a blister for a single MK 108 30 mm (1.2 in) cannon and 60 (other writers say 45) rounds. The Walter HWK 109-509A single-chamber rocket engine was mounted beneath the aft fuselage, which also carried a twin-fin empennage and the drogue parachute housing.

Landing the aircraft required the extension of the retractable landing skid and the deployment of a braking drogue parachute. As pilots could access the plane only from a hatch above the cockpit, the pilot would have to enter the E.381 before it could be attached to the carrier Ar 234C and had no way to escape in case of an emergency, while attached to the carrier.

=== Arado E.381/II ===
The second design, the Mark II, was very similar to the Mark I, aside from being larger and having smaller fins The variant was planned to have a deeper and shorter 5 m (16 ft 5 in) fuselage and a high mid-wing layout. It was to be powered by a Walter HWK 109-509 A-2 engine. The unit was rated at 1,700 kg (3,700 lb) of thrust. About a quarter of the way back from the nose, the fuselage deepened in the form of a hump which extended to the tail. This hump housed a single MK 108 cannon with 45 rounds.

=== Arado E.381/III ===
The third design, the Mark III, was also similar to the Mark I, aside from being larger than any of the preceding variants. The circular cross-section of the previous variants became more triangular and the 30-millimeter (1.2 in) MK 108 cannon was replaced with six rockets of an unspecified type. Although the landing procedure was unchanged, a hatch was added on the side to provide for simpler pilot entry and exit.

== Specifications (E.381/I) ==
A three-view of an Arado E.381/I

Data from Aircraft of the Luftwaffe 1935–1945: An Illustrated History for the Arado E.381/I

General characteristics

- Crew: 1
- Length: 4.69 m (15 ft 5 in)
- Wingspan: 4.43 m (14 ft 6 in)
- Height: 1.29 m (4 ft 3 in)
- Empty weight: 830 kg (1,830 lb)
- Gross weight: 1,200 kg (2,646 lb)
- Powerplant: 1 × Walter HWK 109-509A liquid-fuelled rocket

Performance

- Maximum speed: 900 km/h (560 mph, 490 kn)

Armament

- Guns: 1 × 30-millimeter (1.2 in) MK 108 cannon
- Rockets: 6 × RZ 73 rockets (Mark III only)

== See also ==
- Emergency Fighter Program
- List of rocket aircraft
- Sombold So 344

== Bibliography ==
- Albrecht, Ulrich (2002). "Military Technology and National Socialist Ideology". In Renneberg, Monika; Walker, Mark (eds.). Science, Technology, and National Socialism. Cambridge, UK: Cambridge University Press. pp. 88–125. ISBN 978-0-521-52860-3.
- Ford, Roger (2000). Germany's Secret Weapons in World War II. Osceola, WI: MBI Publishing Co. ISBN 978-0-7603-0847-9.
- Green, William (1971). Rocket Fighter. Ballantine's Illustrated History of World War II: Weapons Book, No. 20. New York, NY: Ballantine Books. ISBN 978-0-345-02163-2.
- Griehl, Manfred (1998). Jet Planes of the Third Reich: The Secret Projects, Volume 1. Sturbridge, MA: Monogram Aviation Publications. ISBN 978-0-914144-36-6.
- Herwig, Dieter; Rode, Heinz (2003). Luftwaffe Secret Projects: Ground Attack & Special Purpose Aircraft. Hinckley, UK: Midland Publishing. ISBN 978-1-85780-150-7.
- Kay, Antony L.; Smith, J.R. (2002). German Aircraft of the Second World War. Annapolis, MD: Naval Institute Press. ISBN 978-1-55750-010-6.
- Krantzhoff, Jörg Armin (1997). Arado: History of an Aircraft Company. Atglen, PA: Schiffer. ISBN 978-0-7643-0293-0.
- Lepage, Jean-Denis (2009). Aircraft of the Luftwaffe 1935–1945: An Illustrated History. Jefferson, NC: McFarland. ISBN 978-0-7864-3937-9.
