= List of aircraft engines of Germany during World War II =

This is a list of all German motors including all aircraft engines, rocket motors, jets and any other powerplants, along with a very basic description. It includes experimental engines as well as those that made it to production status.

The Reich Air Ministry used an internal designation system that included a prefix number signifying the engine type, 9 for piston engines and 109 for jets and rockets, followed by a manufacturer's code, followed by an engine series number. Unlike the 9-prefixed piston engine designations, the 109-series of reaction-thrust, turbojet, turboprop and rocket engine designation numbers' three-place numerical suffixes had no "firm adherence" to any one manufacturer.

- 090–099 – various minor manufacturers
- 1 – Bayerische Motorenwerke GmbH (BMW); later changed to 800 block
- 2 – Junkers Flugzeug- und Motorenwerke A.G.
- 3 – BMW-Flugmotorenwerke Brandenburg GmbH (BMW-Bramo)
- 4 – Argus Motoren GmbH
- 5 – Heinkel Hirth Motoren GmbH
- 6 – Daimler-Benz A.G.
- 7 – Brückner or Klöckner-Humboldt-Deutz A.G.
- 8 – Bayerische Motorenwerke GmbH (BMW)

Using this system, the famous BMW engine used in the Focke-Wulf Fw 190 would be known as the 9-801 (Piston(9)-BMW(8)Number(01)). However, this system was not widely used, even within the RLM, and a common name consisting of the manufacturer's name (often abbreviated) followed by the model number was much more common. The list below uses the common BMW 801 instead of the official 9-801.

Engines produced before the RLM's designation system was set up are often listed using the same basic terminology. So while the interwar Argus 10 engine can be referred to as the As 10, it is not correct to call it the 9–10, this designation was never applied.

Notable engines:

BMW 003 — BMW 801 — HWK 109–509

The Luftwaffe also used engines from France, particularly the Gnôme-Rhône 14 cylinder series of radial engines for its Henschel Hs 129 (14M) ground attack aircraft and Messerschmitt Me 323 (14N) "Gigant" transporter.

== Piston engines (motors) ==
=== Argus Motoren ===
- Argus As 8 – air-cooled, 4-inline
- Argus As 10 air-cooled, inverted V-8 engine
- Argus As 401 eight-cylinder
- Argus As 402
- Argus As 410 12-cylinder, air-cooled
- Argus As 411 larger development of the 410
- Argus As 412 H-block development of the 410
- Argus As 413

=== Bayerische Motorenwerke ===
- BMW VI V-12 water-cooled
- BMW 112 V-12 water-cooled, (prototype)
- BMW 114 9-cylinder radial diesel, combined air-water-cooled (prototypes)
- BMW 116 V-12 water-cooled
- BMW 117 V-12 water-cooled
- BMW 132 9-cylinder radial, air-cooled
- BMW 139 14-cylinder two-row radial, air-cooled (prototype)
- BMW 801 14-cylinder two-row radial, air-cooled — most-produced radial engine of the Third Reich
- BMW 802 experimental, 18-cylinder two-row radial
- BMW 803 experimental, 28-cylinder liquid-cooled four-row radial
- BMW 804

=== BMW-Bramo ===
- Bramo 323 - 9 cylinder air cooled radial

=== Daimler-Benz ===
- Daimler-Benz DB 600 12-cylinder inverted-V
- Daimler-Benz DB 601 improved DB 600 with fuel injection
- Daimler-Benz DB 602 16-cylinder diesel powered the two Hindenburg class airships
- Daimler-Benz DB 603 "enlarged DB601" (largest displacement German inverted V12) for use in bombers and fighter-bombers, little fighter use
- Daimler-Benz DB 604 prototype 24-cylinder (X-24) engine, cancelled in September 1942
- Daimler-Benz DB 605 improved and slightly enlarged DB601 for use in fighters
- Daimler-Benz DB 606 First conceived in February 1937; composed of twinned DB 601 engines, a 1.5 tonne weight coupled "power system", derided as a "welded-together engine" by Goering in August 1942
- Daimler-Benz DB 607 a four-stroke diesel version of DB 603 engine.
- Daimler-Benz DB 609 16-cylinder version of DB 603 engine.
- Daimler-Benz DB 610 First conceived in June 1940; composed of twinned DB 605 engines, a coupled "power system", to replace the DB 606
- Daimler-Benz DB 612
- Daimler-Benz DB 613 First conceived in March 1940; two coupled "power system" DB603 engines, total weight of 1.8 tonnes apiece, as with the 606 and 610, experimental only
- Daimler-Benz DB 614 development of the DB 603G, 2000 hp. Abandoned June 1942
- Daimler-Benz DB 615 consisted of two coupled DB 614 engines. 4000 hp. Abandoned in June 1942.
- Daimler-Benz DB 616 a development of the DB 605. Abandoned in June 1942.
- Daimler-Benz DB 617 a developmenent of the DB 603 for long-range flight.
- Daimler-Benz DB 618 two coupled DB 617 engines.
- Daimler-Benz DB 619
- Daimler-Benz DB 620
- Daimler-Benz DB 621 DB 605 with a two-stage supercharger. 1620 hp. Abandoned in September 1942
- Daimler-Benz DB 622 DB 603 with a two-stage mechanical supercharger and a turbosupercharger. 1970 hp. Abandoned in January 1943
- Daimler-Benz DB 623 DB 603G with twin turbo-superchargers. 2265 hp. Abandoned January 1943
- Daimler-Benz DB 624 DB 603 with both a two-stage mechanical supercharger and a turbosupercharger. 1900 hp. Abandoned in April 1943
- Daimler-Benz DB 625 DB 605D with turbo supercharger. 1755 hp. Abandoned
- Daimler-Benz DB 626 DB 603G with twin turbosuperchargers and induction cooler. 2125 hp. Abandoned November 1942
- Daimler-Benz DB 627 603 with a two-stage supercharger and after-cooler. Development abandoned in March 1944
- Daimler-Benz DB 628 DB 605, fitted with a two-stage supercharger. Abandoned in March 1944
- Daimler-Benz DB 629
- Daimler-Benz DB 630 36 cylinder Double W engine with a capacity of 89 litres and output in the 4,000 HP class (2,940 KW)
- Daimler-Benz DB 631 DB 603G with a three-stage supercharger. 1900 hp. Abandoned
- Daimler-Benz DB 632 DB 603N, with a drive for contra-rotating propellers

=== Klöckner-Humboldt-Deutz ===
- DZ 710 16-cylinder horizontally opposed diesel
- DZ 720 32-cylinder H-block version of the 710

=== Hirth Motoren and Heinkel-Hirth ===
- Hirth HM 4 – 4-cylinder air-cooled inline
- Hirth HM 6 – 6-cylinder air-cooled inline
- Hirth HM 8 – 8-cylinder air-cooled inline
- Hirth HM 12 – 12-cylinder air-cooled inline
- Hirth HM 150 – 8-cylinder air-cooled inline
- Hirth HM 504 4-cylinder air-cooled inline
- Hirth HM 506 6-cylinder air-cooled inline
- Hirth HM 508 8-cylinder air-cooled V-8
- Hirth HM 512 12-cylinder air-cooled inverted inlines

=== Junkers Motoren ===
- Jumo 204 6-cylinder opposed liquid-cooled diesel;
- Jumo 205 improved Jumo 204 of smaller size;
- Jumo 207 improved 205 with a turbocharger;
- Jumo 208 enlarged development of the 207;
- Jumo 210 inverted V-12;
- Jumo 211 inverted V-12, mostly for bomber use, most produced German aviation engine of World War II;
- Jumo 212 Two Jumo 211 "coupled" (geared together), "twinned-up" in the same manner as the competing DB 610;
- Jumo 213 improved Jumo 211, inverted V-12;
- Jumo 222 key engine program for German military aircraft: experimental 24-cylinder supercharged liquid-cooled "star" (6 banks, of 4 cylinders apiece) aircraft engine; nearly 300 examples built
- Jumo 223 "box" engine made of four 207s;
- Jumo 224 "box" engine made of four 208s.

Siemens–Schuckert Werke

- Sh 14 – 7-cylinder air-cooled radial
- Sh 20 – 9-cylinder air-cooled radial
- Sh 22 [SAM 322] – 9-cylinder air-cooled radial

== Jet and rocket engines ==
(Rocket engines, turboprops, turbojets, and other non-piston engines included)
For the Last three digits: 001-499 Air Breathing, 500–999 Non-Air Breathing (Rockets)

=== Air-breathing ===
(turbojets, turboprops, pulsejets, .... )

- Heinkel HeS 3
- 109-001 Heinkel HeS 8
- 109-002 BMW-Bramo 002
- 109-003 BMW 003 turbojet
- 109-004 Junkers Jumo 004 turbojet
- 109-005 Porsche 005 short-lifespan cruise missile engine
- 109-006 Junkers/Heinkel 006
- 109-007 Daimler-Benz 007
- 109-011 Heinkel HeS 011, key late-war German development turbojet (only 19 examples built)
- 109-012 Junkers 012 – developed into the Kuznetsov NK-12 turboprop engine
- 109-014 Argus As 014 pulsejet
- 109-016 Daimler-Benz 016 turbojet
- 109-018 BMW 018 turbojet
- 109-021 Heinkel HeS 21 turboprop, (project)
- 109-022 Junkers 022
- 109-028 BMW 028, (project)
- 109-044 Argus 044

=== Rockets ===
(non-air breathing engines: liquid-fuel rocket, solid-fuel rocket)

- 109-448 BMW-built liquid-fuel rocket, intended for the Ruhrstahl X-4 wire-guided air-to-air missile
- 109-500 Walter, self-contained Starthilfe monopropellant RATO unit, jettisonable following take-off with parachute recovery
- 109-501 Walter, an experimental uprated Starthilfe RATO unit similar to the -500 model, but with 1,500 kgf (3,300 lb) thrust that also used a kerosene/hydrazine-base fuel with the T-Stoff
- 109-502 Rheinmetall
- 109-505 Schmidding, rocket (solid fuel)
- 109-506 WASAG
- 109-507 Walter
- 109-508
- 109–509 Walter HWK 109–509 liquid-fuel rocket, produced in both single (-A) and twin-chamber (-B and -C) versions
- 109-510 BMW, 109–511 rocket (liquid fuel)
- 109-511 BMW
- 109-512 WASAG, rocket (solid fuel)
- 109-513 Schmidding
- 109-515 Rheinmetall, rocket (solid fuel)
- 109-522 WASAG, rocket (solid fuel)
- 109-528 BMW
- 109-532 WASAG, rocket (solid fuel)
- 109-533 Schmidding, rocket (solid fuel)
- 109-543 Schmidding, rocket (solid fuel)
- 109-515 Rheinmetall
- 109-548 BMW
- 109-553 Schmidding
- 109-558 BMW, rocket (liquid fuel)
- 109-559 Walter
- 109-563 Schmidding, rocket (solid fuel)
- 109-573 Schmidding, rocket (solid fuel)
- 109-593 Schmidding, rocket (solid fuel)
- 109-603 Schmidding, rocket (solid fuel)
- 109-613 Konrad
- 109-708 BMW
- 109-718 BMW (liquid-fuel rocket, used with the BMW 003 jet to make up the "BMW 003R" mixed propulsion system)
- 109-719 Walter
- 109-729 Walter, rocket (liquid fuel)
- 109-739 Walter

Other

- Walter R I-203
- Walter R II-203

== See also ==
RLM aircraft designation system
List of RLM aircraft designations

== Bibliography ==
- Jason R. Wisniewski, Powering the Luftwaffe: German Aero Engines of World War II, FriesenPress, Victoria, BC, Canada, 2013.
- Bill Gunston, World Encyclopedia of Aero Engines: From the Pioneers to the Present Day, Sutton Publishing Ltd, Thrupp, Gloucestershire, UK, 2006.
- Herschel Smith, Aircraft Piston Engines: From the Manly Balzer to the Continental Tiara, Sunflower University Press, Manhattan, Kansas, 1986.
- Antony L. Kay, German Jet Engine and Gas Turbine Development, 1930–45, Crowood Press, 2002.
