= Walter HWK 109-509 =

1940s German aircraft rocket engine

HWK 509
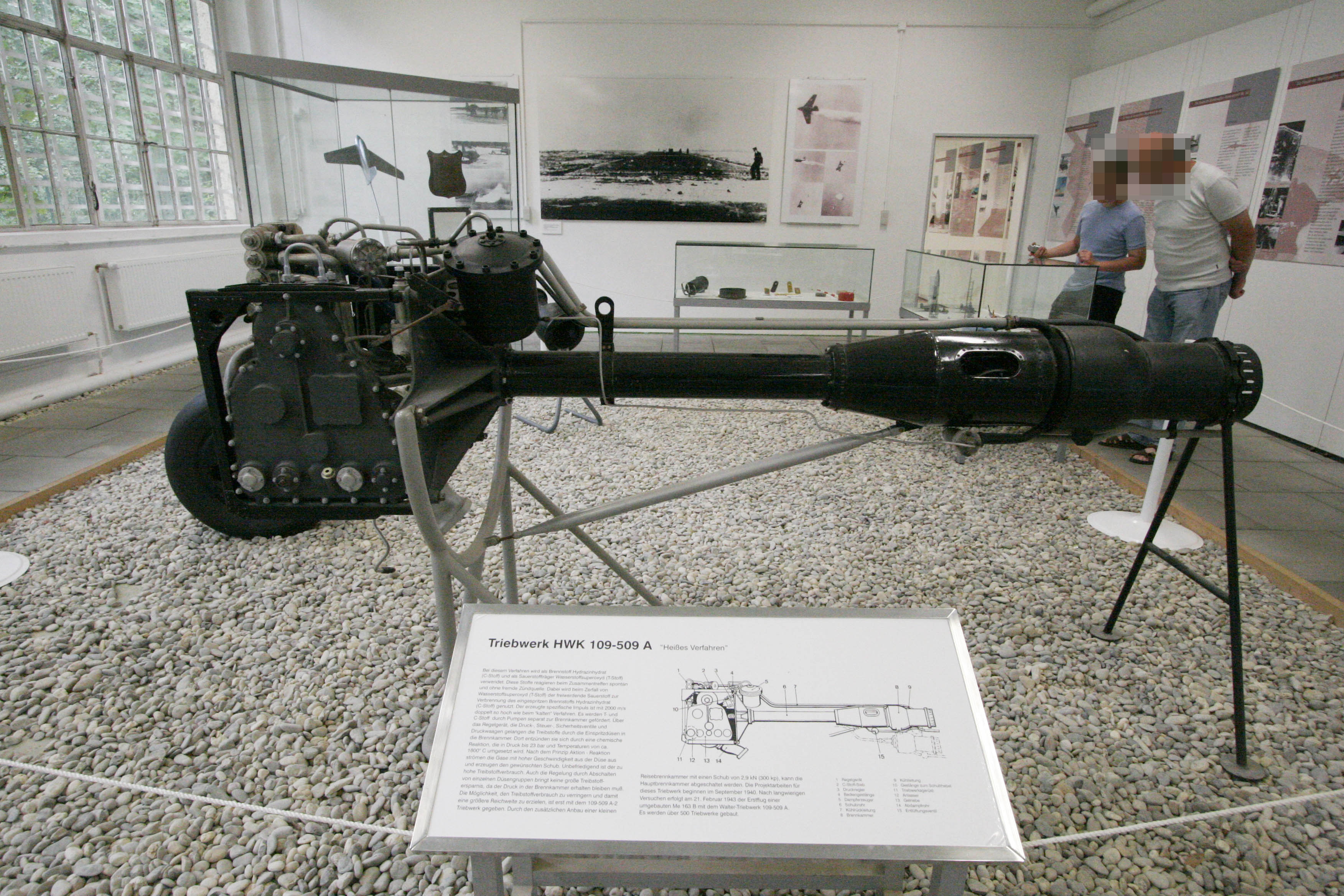
- HWK 109-509A on display at the Luftwaffenmuseum, Berlin-Gatow, Germany
- Type: Rocket engine
- Manufacturer: Hellmuth Walter Kommanditgesellschaft
- First run: 1943
- Major applications: Messerschmitt Me 163; Bachem Ba 349

The Walter HWK 109-509 was a German liquid-fuel bipropellant rocket engine that powered the Messerschmitt Me 163 Komet and Bachem Ba 349 aircraft. It was produced by Hellmuth Walter Kommanditgesellschaft (HWK) commencing in 1943, with licensed production by the Heinkel firm's facilities in Jenbach, Austria.

== Design and development ==
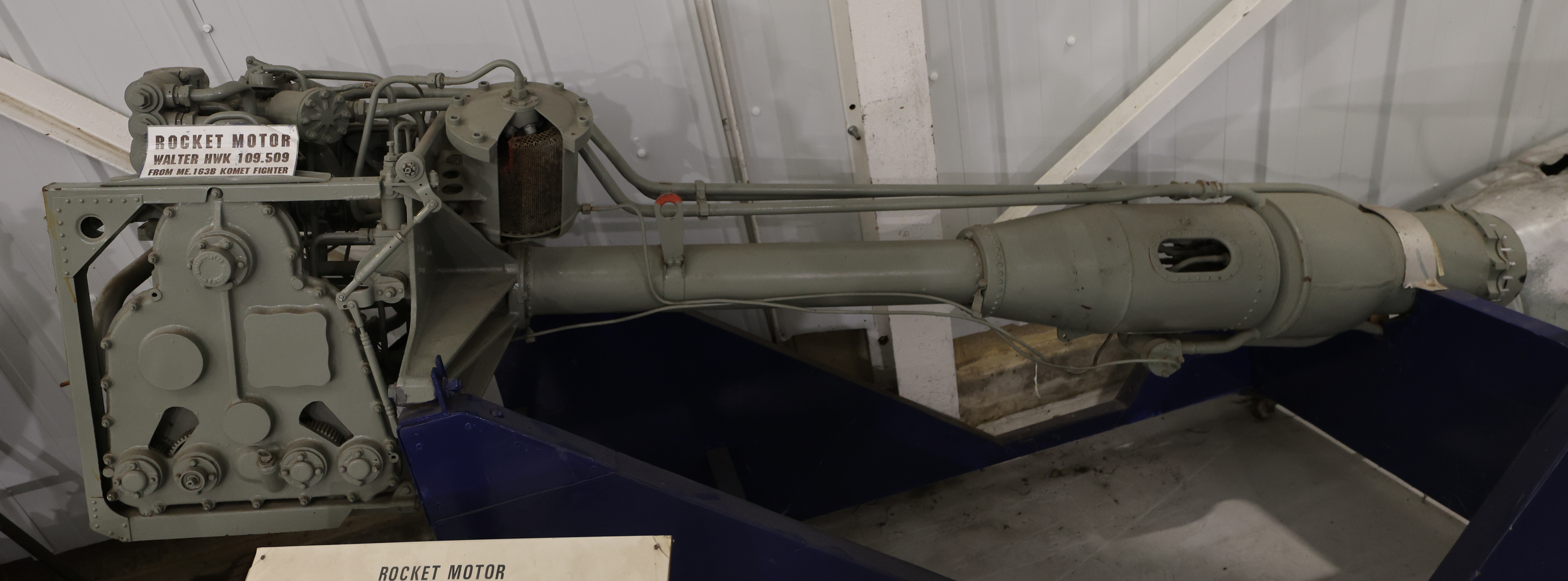
An early Walter HWK 109-509A-1 rocket motor, believed to be one of the best preserved in existence and possibly used for instructional purposes.(Image from Shuttleworth Collection, UK)

Early versions of the Me 163 had been powered by an earlier design running on a "cold engine" fueled with Z-Stoff. This fuel tended to clog the jets in the combustion chamber, causing fluctuations in power and potentially explosions. Worse, however, was that the engine could not be throttled, and when the aircraft leveled off after its climb to altitude it quickly accelerated to speeds that caused serious compressibility issues. The RLM demanded that a version be developed with a throttle.

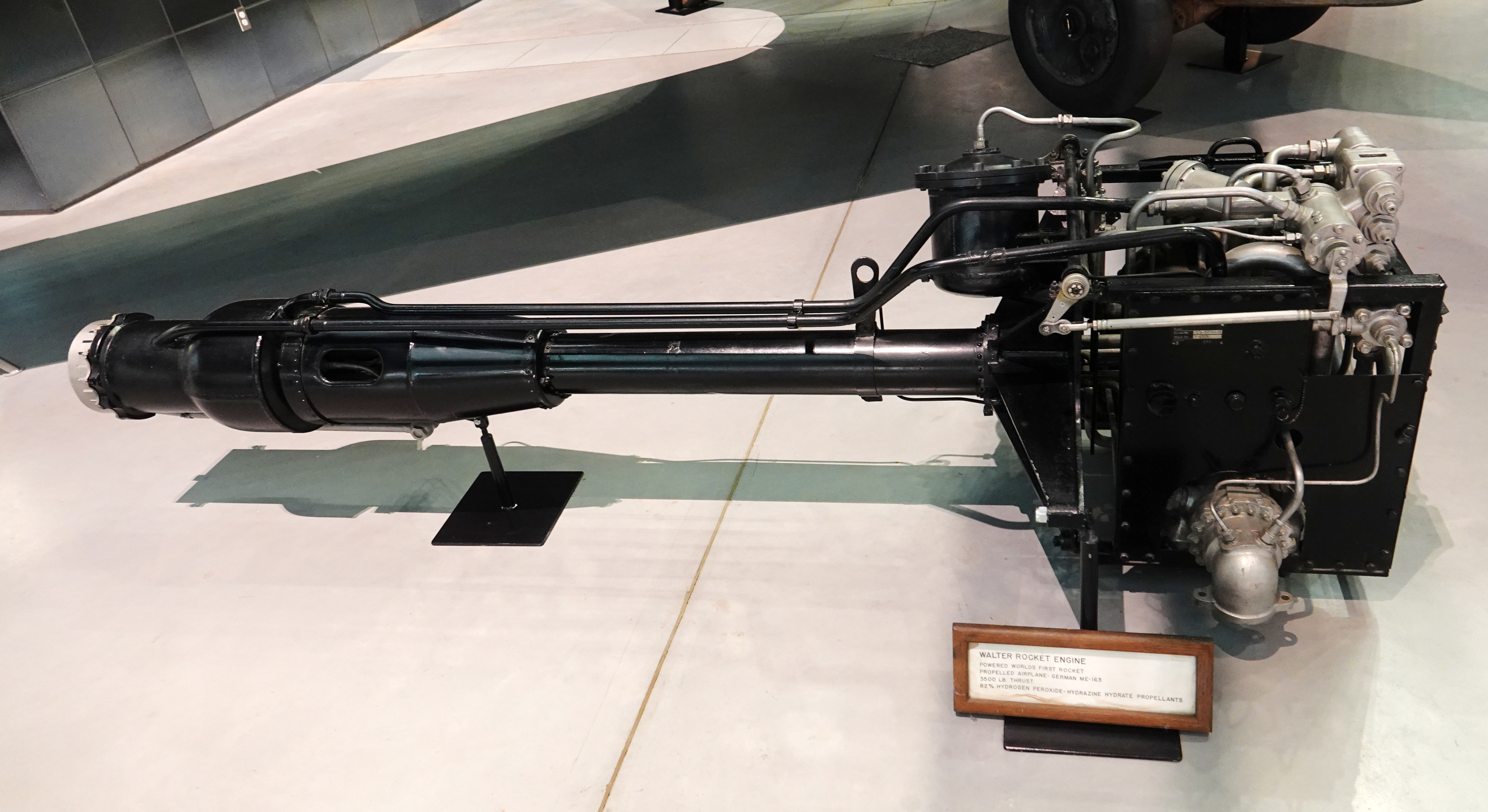
HWK 109-509 A-1 Rocket Engine at Steven F. Udvar-Hazy Center Virginia, USA.

During this period Walter had also been working with a new fuel known as C-Stoff that gave off significant heat and was thus known as the "hot engine". C-Stoff was a mix of 30% hydrazine hydrate, 57% methanol, and 13% water, with a small amount of potassium-copper-cyanide. The oxidizer, known as T-Stoff, consisted of an 80%-concentration hydrogen peroxide-based formulation. The two reacted violently on contact. The violent combustion process resulted in the formation of water, carbon dioxide and nitrogen, and a huge amount of heat sending out a superheated stream of steam, nitrogen and air that was drawn in through the hole in the mantle of the engine, thus providing a forward thrust of approximately 17 kN (3,820 lbf).

To address the throttling issue, the new engine included turbopumps with two settings. The pumps were driven by a single turbine, powered by steam created by decomposing the T-Stoff with a wire mesh catalyst. Combined with a mechanical throttle, this provided four power settings from idle to full power for climbing. In practice it was found that throttling the engine dramatically decreased its fuel economy to the point that it did not extend the endurance of the aircraft as expected. This version was put into the Me 163B in spite of this problem.

The ultimate solution to the throttling problem was the B and C series of the engine. These engines used two combustion chambers, the original one (retroactively given the name Hauptofen), and a second, smaller Marschofen chamber directly beneath the main Hauptofen chamber, tuned to provide the cruise power needed for high-speed level flight, about 400 kilograms-force (3,900 N; 880 lbf). This chamber provided that power at peak efficiency, so it did not suffer from the problems found while throttling on the original models. The throttle on the original combustion chamber was removed, and throttling was instead provided by turning the main engine on and off. This new version dramatically improved cruise endurance, with overall flight times improving from eight to twelve minutes, a 50% improvement. It was also mechanically simpler as the turbopumps were no longer throttled.

The engine was an integral design with all components of the drive, with the exception of fuel tanks, locked in a cubical frame — this frame was discarded for the 109-509C dual-chamber design.

== Variants ==
- 509 A-0: Pre-production model, manufactured from May 1943. The thrust of this engine was regulated between 300 kp (2.9 kN) and 1500 kp (14.7 kN (3,300 lbf)).
- 509 A-1: The first series production engine was used in the Messerschmitt Me 163 B from August 1944. The thrust here was adjustable between 100 kp (1 kN) and 1600 kp (15.7 kN (3,500 lbf)).
- 509 A-2: Version for the Messerschmitt Me 163B-1a. Weighing only 100 kg (220 lb) complete, this engine consisted of two main assemblies, the roughly-cubical shape framed forward assembly comprising the turbine housing, the fuel pumps geared to the turbine shaft, the control box, a pressure-reducing valve and the electric starter motor, with the aft assembly made up of the combustion chamber, connected to the fore unit by a cylindrical "thrust-tube" containing pipes which carried fuel to the combustion chamber's individual injector jets. The thrust was adjustable between 200 kp (2 kN (450 lbf)) and a maximum of 1700 kp (16.7 kN (3,800 lbf)).
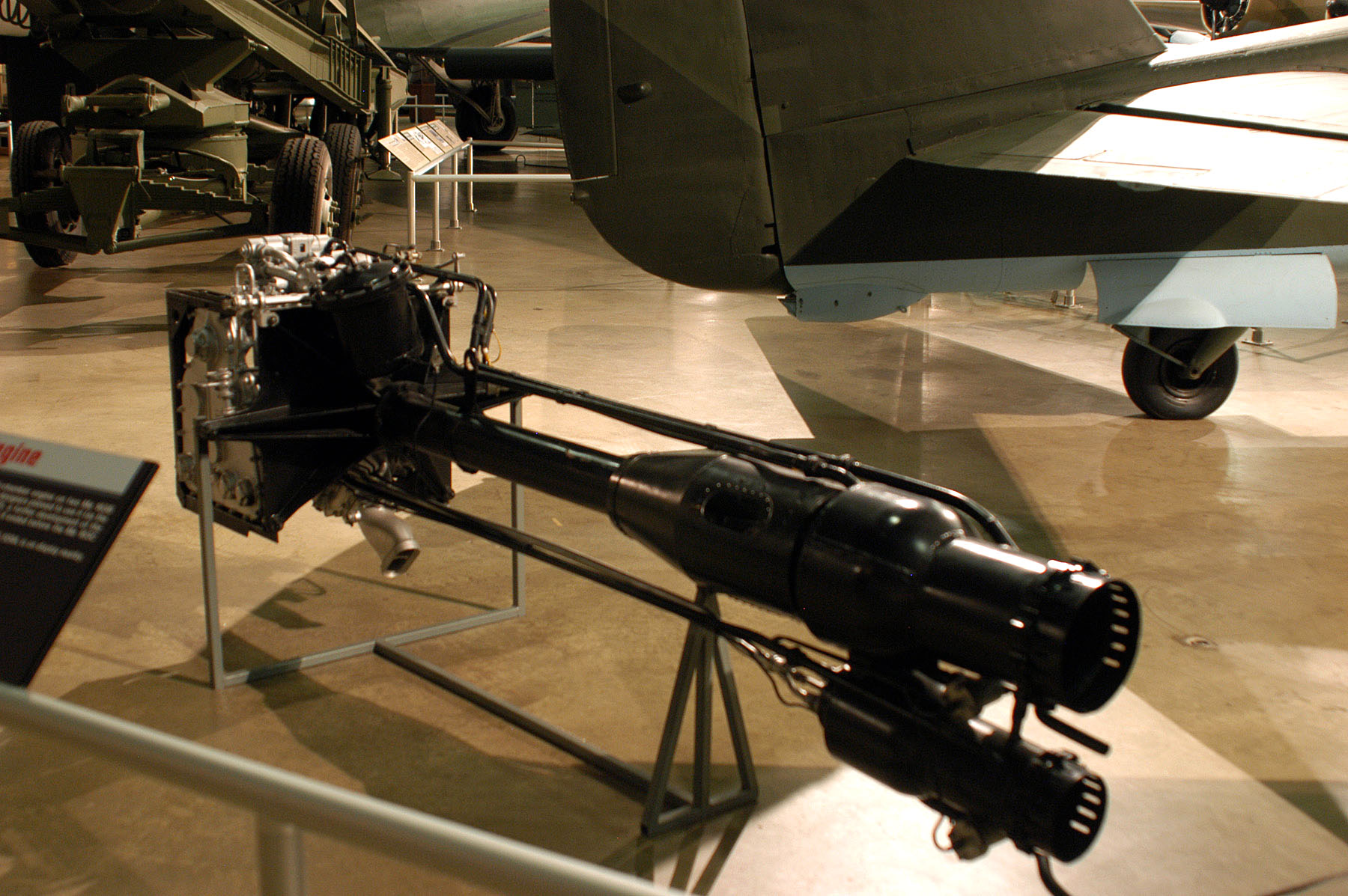
  The HWK 509B dual-chamber version, on display at the NMUSAF
- 509 B-1: Increased performance version of the 509 A-1. This engine was the initial version to feature the twin Hauptofen main chamber above, and lower thrust Marschofen cruise chamber design directly below the main chamber, with an additional thrust of 300 kp (2.9 kN (650 lbf)). This auxiliary chamber proved necessary due to the actual T-Stoff oxidizer consumption of the main unit, at nearly 5 kg/s, exceeding estimates by 100%. Thrust from main chamber adjustable between 100 kp (1 kN (220 lbf)) and 2000 kp (19.6 kN (4,400 lbf)). Fully restored examples of both the Me 163B's single-chamber rocket motor, as well as the only known example — stated as the third prototype example — in the United States of the experimental twin-chamber Walter "509B" rocket motor, are each on display in front, one each to either side of the NMUSAF's restored Me 163B, bearing Werknummer (serial number) 191 095 on its vertical fin.
- 509 C-1: Dual-chamber motor like the B-series, based on the uprated version of the 509 A-2, but having a main Hauptofen chamber with a differing forward shape from that on the 509B, while also discarding the open-structure cubical frame for lighter weight. The main combustion chamber gave between 400 kp (3.9 kN (880 lbf)) and 2000 kp (19.6 kN (4,400 lbf)), the Marschofen auxiliary chamber 400 kp (3.9 kN (880 lbf)). To be used in the Me 263 (Ju 248). One surviving example on museum display at the Royal Air Force Museum Cosford.
- 509 D-1: Variant of the 509 C-1 for use in the improved B-series airframes of the Bachem Ba 349 Natter. Engine designed to be recovered by parachute, along with the entire rear section with empennage.
- 509 S-2 A completely revised lightened version for use as a permanently installed booster rocket on the Messerschmitt Me 262 Heimatschützer IV home defence interceptor.
- HWK RII-211 - Company designation for prototype engines of the 509A-2 series

== Applications ==
- Arado Ar E.381
- Bachem Ba 349
- DFS 228
- Focke-Wulf Volksjäger 2
- Messerschmitt Me 163
- Messerschmitt Me 262C, in Heimatschützer prototype evaluation designs.

== Engines on display ==
- National Museum of the United States Air Force (both single-chamber 509 A and twin-chamber 509 B versions)
- National Museum of Flight
- Cosmosphere
- Luftwaffenmuseum der Bundeswehr
- Shuttleworth Collection
- Ballarat Aviation Museum

== Specifications (509A) ==
Data from Jane's.

=== General characteristics ===
- Type: Liquid-fuelled rocket engine
- Length: 8 ft, 5 1/2 in
- Diameter: 8 in
- Dry weight: 165.5 kg (365 lb)
- Fuel: T-Stoff (Hydrogen peroxide) oxidizer and C-Stoff (hydrazine hydrate/alcohol mix) fuel propellants

=== Components ===
- Pumps:

=== Performance ===
- Thrust: 14.7 kN (3,300 lbf)
- Burn time:
- Thrust specific fuel consumption: 20 lb/hr/lbf (1800 N-s/kg)

== See also ==
Related lists

- List of aircraft engines
- List of aircraft engines of Germany during World War II
