= Walter HWK 109-507 =

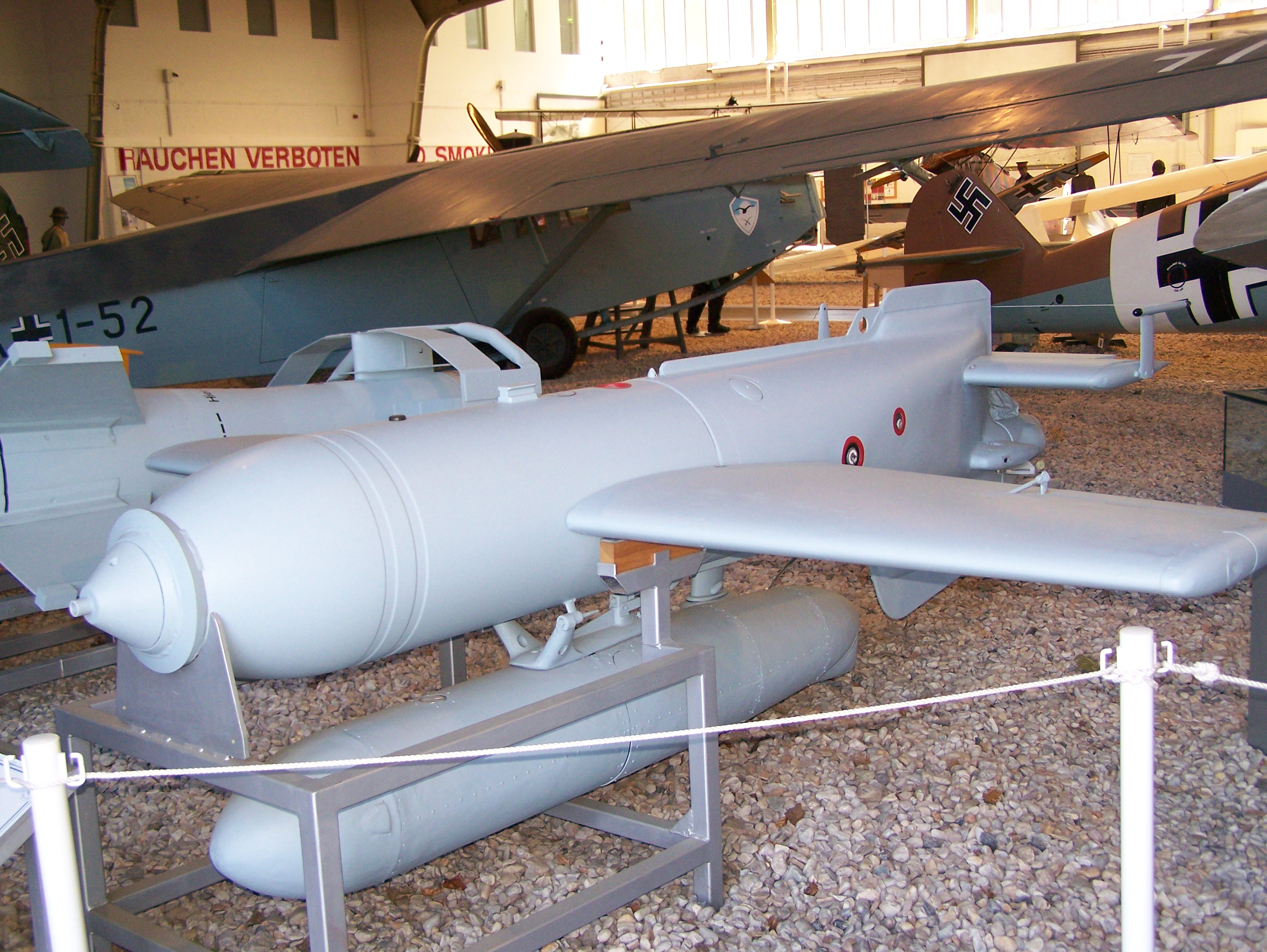
Hs 293 missile

The HWK 109-507 was a liquid-propellant rocket engine developed by Germany during World War II. It was used to propel the Hs 293 anti-ship guided missile.

It was produced by Hellmuth Walter Kommanditgesellschaft (HWK). Like other Walter engines it used hydrogen peroxide as a propellant.

== Missile ==
The Hs293 has been variously described as a missile or as a boosted glide bomb. It consisted of an SC500 bomb casing, fitted with wings, engine and radio control. Control equipment was housed in a rearward extension of the bomb casing but the motor was mounted in a separate housing beneath. It had originally been developed as an unpowered glide bomb, "Gustav Schwartz Propellerwerke", and the engine was added later. After flight tests, a visible tracking flare was also added, in a further rearward extension.

As the engine was mounted below the missile fuselage, the exhaust nozzle pointed downwards at 30°, so as to align the line of thrust with the centre of gravity of the missile.

The engine had a burning time of around 10 seconds. After this the missile glided to the target, taking up to 100 seconds for a range of 8.5 km.

As it was intended for attacking lightly- or unarmoured targets, it did not require an armour-piercing high impact speed. (Note: The Fritz-X was intended to attack armoured capital ships and so was unpowered, free-falling steeply and reaching a high speed, at the cost of a range half that of the Hs 293)

The same engine was also used for the planned Hs 294, Hs 295 and Hs 296 missiles. As these larger missiles weighed twice the Hs 293, they used a pair of the engines, one under each wing root.

== Development ==
This engine was a development of the HWK 109-500 Starthilfe (rocket-assisted take-off) engine. The 109-500 was pod-mounted and parachuted back to earth after takeoff. Engine pods were serviced and re-used.

The 109-507 was developed from the 109–500. As a missile engine, it was only required to work once, and for a short duration. It was thus simplified in both its features and in its construction materials. Rather than the complex centrifugal turbopumps used for most Walter engines, a simple gas pressurisation system was used to feed the propellants. A wartime British report expressed surprise that the engine's combustion chamber was made of mere mild steel, rather than anything more refractory.

== Engine ==
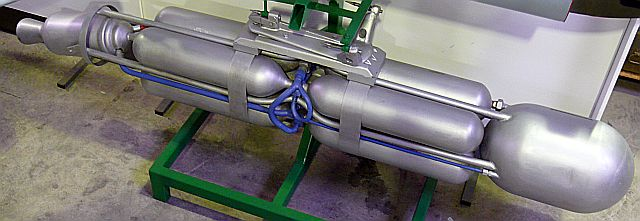
Rocket motor, casing removed

The engine's fuel chemistry used 80% high test hydrogen peroxide or 'T-Stoff'. This was a 'cold cycle' engine; the peroxide acted as a monopropellant and was decomposed by a catalyst into superheated steam and oxygen. (Note: The more complex 'hot cycle' then burned a kerosene fuel in combination with the evolved oxygen. These were more powerful and fuel efficient, but also more complex and required turbopumps with precision moving parts.) The catalyst used was a consumable liquid solution of calcium permanganate or 'Z-Stoff'. As this catalyst is consumed, the engine is regarded as a bipropellant engine.

Propellants are forced into the combustion chamber by compressed air, stored at 200 bar (2,900 psi) in two steel vessels. This pressure is released through an electrically fired cartridge that opens a valve with a blow-out disc. This is the full extent of the electrical control system. Once fired, the valve does not close again. A pressure regulator delivers air at 33 bar (480 psi), through a shuttle valve that pressurised first the catalyst tanks and then the propellant tank. This delay ensures reliable ignition in the combustion chamber. A non-return valve ensures that no catalyst can flow backwards into the air or propellant plumbing, with an explosive result. A rubber diaphragm, broken as propellant pressure builds, ensures that there is no backflow through the combustion chamber either. Z-stoff was known for problems of clogging injectors and so an inline filter was used. (Note: The unreliability of Z-stoff and its clogging meant that it was largely replaced with other fuel cycles for crewed aircraft.)

The propellant injector in the combustion chamber is a simple light alloy casting, cooled by the propellant flow. The combustion chamber is single-walled mild steel, with no provision for cooling. A steel mixing cup is downstream of the injector, with the radial Z-Stoff 6mm pipe leading into it. One 3 mm diameter injector nozzle points into the cup, thirty smaller radial 2 mm nozzles deliver most of the propellant along the walls of the chamber. Helical swirl baffles in the chamber promote good mixing and decomposition of the peroxide.

Thrust varied through the boost phase, as air pressure and propellant flow fell, dropping from 600 kgf to 400 kgf.

The engine pod had a dry weight of 517 kg, carrying 68 kg of propellants when full.
