= Stoff =

Stoff is an English surname, originating in Early Middle Ages England. Notable people with the surname include:

- Denis Stoff, stage name of the Ukrainian musician Denis Shaforostov (born 1992)
- Erwin Stoff (born 1951), American film producer

== See also ==
- List of stoffs
