= Arado Ar 234 Blitz =

German jet-powered bomber

Ar 234 Blitz
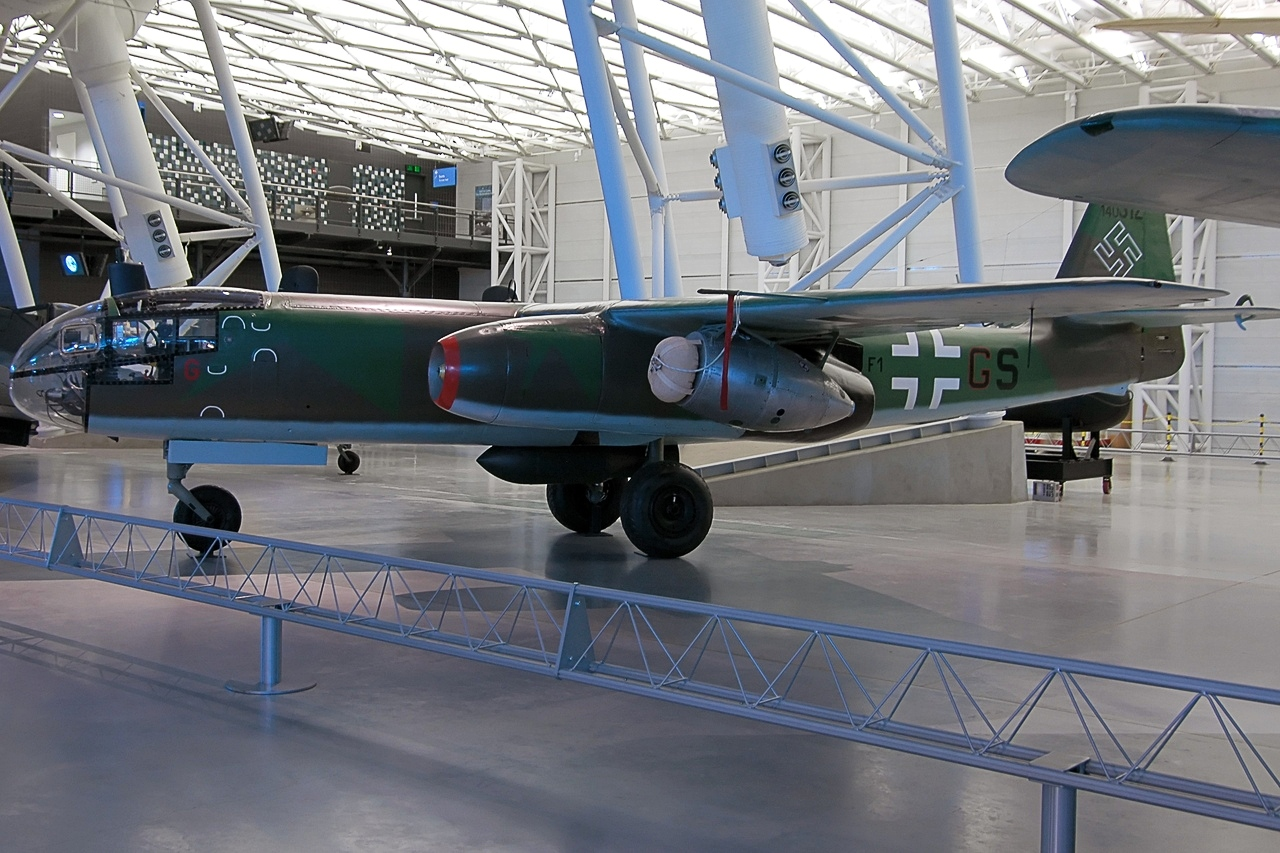
- Arado Ar 234 B-2 at the National Air and Space Museum's Steven F. Udvar-Hazy Center in Virginia, US

General information
- Type: Reconnaissance / bomber
- Manufacturer: Arado Flugzeugwerke
- Designer: Walter Blume
- Primary user: Luftwaffe
- Number built: 214

History
- Manufactured: 1944–1945
- Introduction date: September 1944
- First flight: 30 July 1943
- Retired: May 1945

The Arado Ar 234 Blitz ("Lightning") is a jet-powered bomber designed and produced by the German aircraft manufacturer Arado. It was the world's first operational turbojet-powered bomber, seeing service during the final months of the Second World War.

Development of the Ar 234 can be traced back to the latter half of 1940 and the request to tender from the Ministry of Aviation to produce a jet-powered high-speed reconnaissance aircraft. Arado was the only respondent with their E.370 design. While its range was beneath that of the Ministry's specification, an initial order for two prototypes was promptly issued to the company, designated Ar 234. While both of the prototypes had been mostly completed prior to the end of 1941, the Junkers Jumo 004 turbojet engines were not available prior to February 1943. Due to engine unreliability, the maiden flight of the Ar 234 V1 was delayed until 30 July 1943. In addition to the original reconnaissance-orientated Ar 234A, the fast bomber Ar 234B model was developed in response to a request by the Ministry of Aviation. Due to a lack of internal space in the relatively slender fuselage, bombloads of up to 1,500 kg (3,300 lb) had to be carried on external racks rather than in internal bomb bays.

The Ar 234 was produced only in small numbers, despite plans for production of 500 per month by late 1945. This was partly due to a lack of available jet engines and other critical materials, for which the aircraft had to compete with other types, such as the Messerschmitt Me 262. Several models were proposed, with alternative engines, cockpit improvements, and adaptations for other roles, including as a night fighter. In late 1944, aerial reconnaissance missions over enemy territory commenced. The Ar 234 was almost entirely used to perform such reconnaissance missions, and it was in this capacity that it became the last Luftwaffe aircraft to overfly the United Kingdom during the war, in April 1945. In its capacity as a bomber, the most prominent use of the Ar 234 was the repeated attempts to destroy the Ludendorff Bridge at Remagen between 7 and 17 March 1945. Many airframes were destroyed or captured on the ground due to a lack of serviceable engines or fuel.

== Design and development ==
=== Background ===
During the closing months of 1940, the Nazi German Ministry of Aviation offered a tender for a jet-powered high-speed reconnaissance aircraft with a range of 2,156 km (1,340 mi). Arado was the only company to respond, offering their E.370 project, led by Professor Walter Blume. The design was of a high-wing mostly conventional-looking aircraft powered by a pair of Junkers Jumo 004 turbojet engines, one beneath each wing.

Arado estimated that the E.370 would possess a maximum speed of 780 km/h (480 mph) at 6,000 m (20,000 ft), an operating altitude of 11,000 m (36,000 ft) and a range of 1,995 km (1,240 mi). While the range was less than the Ministry's specification, it was decided to order a pair of prototypes, designated the Ar 234. These were largely complete before the end of 1941, but the Jumo 004 engines were not ready until February 1943. When they did arrive, Junkers considered the engines too unreliable for in-flight use and they were only cleared for ground tests. Months later, flight-ready engines were finally delivered and on 30 July 1943, the Ar 234 V1 made its first flight from Rheine airfield.

The second prototype, V2, crashed on 2 October 1943 at Rheine near Münster after suffering a fire in its port wing, the failure of both engines, and instrumentation failures. The aircraft dived into the ground from 1,200 m (3,900 ft), killing the pilot. Later that year the third prototype, V3, was demonstrated to Adolf Hitler at Insterberg; he was enthusiastic about the aircraft and authorised Arado to obtain factory personnel, raw materials, and the funds necessary to build two hundred by the end of 1944. The eight prototype aircraft were fitted with the trolley-and-skid landing gear intended for the never produced Ar 234A version.

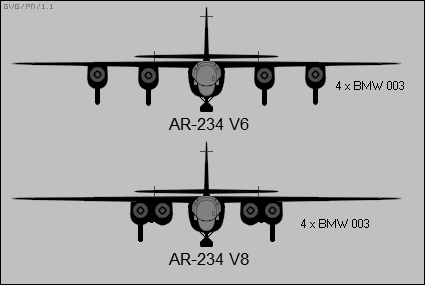
Differences between the pair of four-engined Ar 234 prototype aircraft

The sixth and eighth in the series were powered by four BMW 003 jet engines instead of two Jumo 004s; the sixth had the four engines in individual nacelles, while the eighth had the engines in "twinned" nacelles underneath each wing. A 1942 engineering drawing of the E 370 showed a 1,430 L (310 imp gal; 380 US gal) forward tank, a 830 L (180 imp gal; 220 US gal) mid-fuselage tank, and an rear tank with a 1,540 L (340 imp gal; 410 US gal) capacity. These were the first four-engined jet aircraft to fly. The twin-Jumo 004 powered Ar 234 V7 prototype was the first jet aircraft used for a reconnaissance mission, on 2 August 1944.

==== Landing gear design ====
The projected weight for the aircraft was approximately 8 tonnes (7.9 long tons; 8.8 short tons). To reduce weight and maximize internal fuel capacity, Arado did not use retractable landing gear. Instead, the aircraft was to take off from a jettisonable tricycle gear-style trolley, and land on three retractable skids, one under the central section of the fuselage and one under each engine nacelle. The main skid, beneath the fuselage, was originally intended to retract fully, and was originally shown in a 1942-dated engineering drawing, under the E 370 airframe factory development designation, as intended to be made from a three-sided channel-section component, featuring a set of nine triple-beaded wooden rollers within the channel-section main skid. However, this landing gear did not allow aircraft to move independently after landing, which would have left aircraft scattered over an airfield, unable to taxi off the runway. Erich Sommer said that landing the skid-equipped prototypes on a wet grass airstrip "was like greased lightning" and "like [landing on] soap", due to the complete lack of braking capability.

=== Ar 234B ===
At the request of the Ministry of Aviation, Arado also produced a pair of prototypes configured as fast bombers, as the Ar 234B. On 12 March 1944, the first of these, Ar 234 V9, performed its first flight. It was the first to feature a fully retractable tricycle landing gear, with the main gear retracting forward into the mid-fuselage, and the nose gear retracted rearwards.

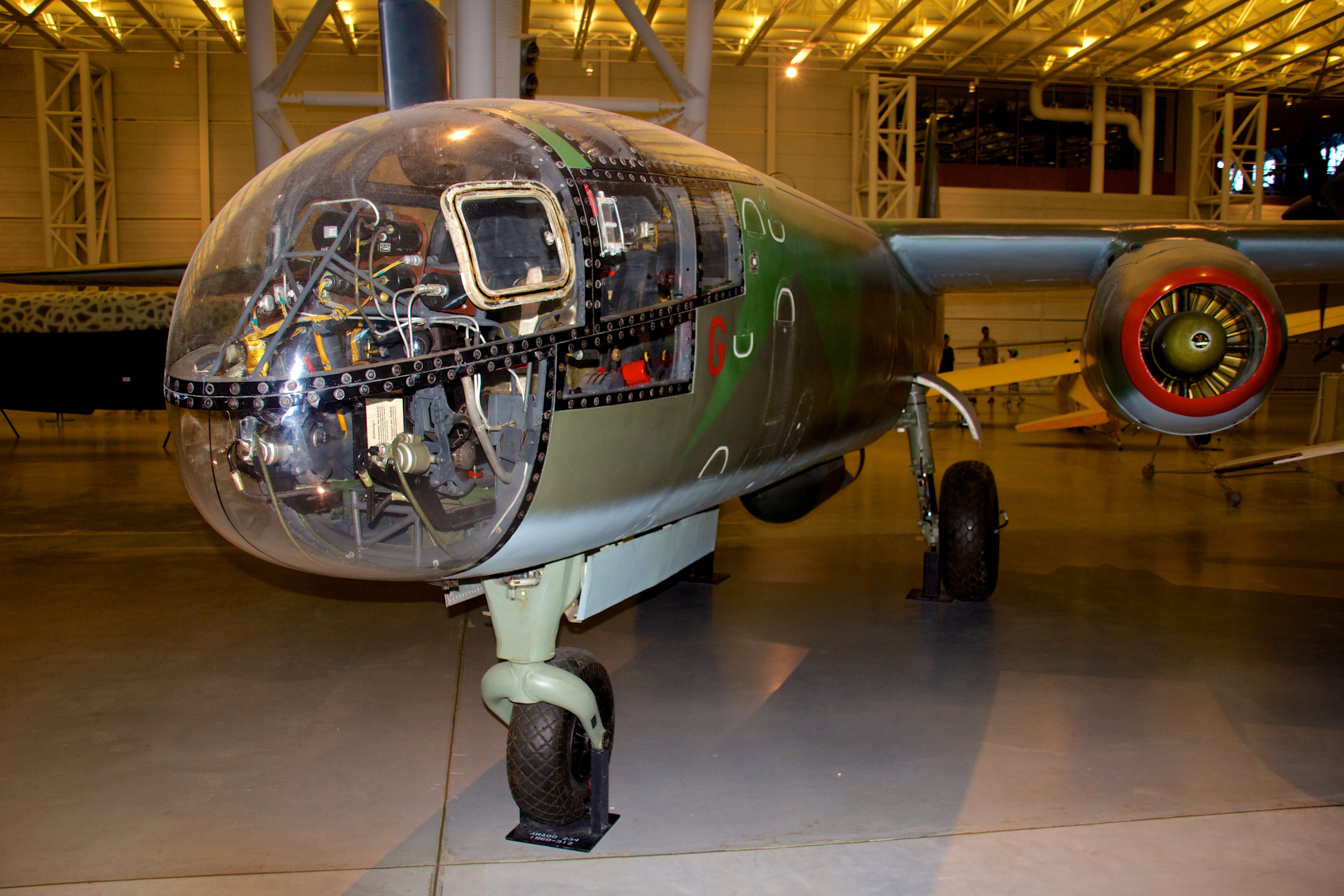
Restored Arado Ar 234 B-2 bomber

The Ar 234's slender fuselage was largely filled with fuel tanks, leaving no room for an internal bomb bay. Bombs were carried on external racks. The forward-set cockpit did not provide the pilot with any visibility to the rear, thus the rear firing guns it was fitted with were aimed through a periscope, mounted on the cockpit roof. This periscope could also be flipped forwards for dive-bombing; however, its usefulness was impaired by the scope's image being flipped upside down. The defensive fixed rear gun system was found to be useless by the pilots, and was omitted in the Ar 234B. The aircraft was widened slightly at mid-fuselage and the central fuel tank was omitted to fit in the main landing gear, while enlarged forward (1,800 L (400 imp gal; 480 US gal)) and aft (2,000 L (440 imp gal; 530 US gal)) fuel tanks compensated for its removal.

During flight testing, while carrying its maximum bombload of three SC 500 bombs, the Ar 234 V9 could reach 672 km/h (418 mph) at 5,000 m (16,000 ft), faster than any other Luftwaffe bomber at the time. The normal bomb load consisted of a pair of 500 kg (1,100 lb) bombs suspended from the engines or one large 1,000 kg (2,200 lb) bomb semi-recessed in the underside of the fuselage, while the maximum bombload was 1,500 kg (3,300 lb). It could also carry the heavier BT 1400 (1,510 kg (3,330 lb) unpowered bomb-torpedo), although the ground clearance was limited. If this munition was deployed, the aircraft's fuel capacity was noticeably reduced while rocket assistance was needed for takeoff. The pilot would engage the autopilot while using the bomb sight, which was interfaced with the autopilot to adjust the aircraft's flight path directly.

Production lines were being set up while the 20 B-0 pre-production aircraft were being delivered, by the end of June. Production was slow, as Arado was to maintain production to compensate for other factories bombed during the USAAF's "Big Week",(20-25 February 1944), in addition to an ongoing license-construction of the Heinkel He 177 heavy bomber. Between mid-1944 and the end of the conflict, only 210 aircraft were built. During February 1945, production switched to the C variant. German plans were for production to reach 500 per month by November 1945.

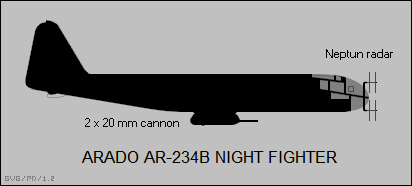
Ar 234B-2/N night fighter modification

In addition, some Ar 234 B-2 airframes were modified to serve as night fighters. Designated Ar 234B-2/N and code named Nachtigall (Nightingale), these were fitted with FuG 218 "Neptun" VHF-band radar, with a reduced-dipole length version of the standard Hirschgeweih eight-dipole element, VHF-band transceiving air interception radar antenna system, and carried a pair of forward-firing 20mm MG 151/20 autocannon within a Magirusbombe conformal gun pod on the rear fuselage hardpoint. The radar system was operated by a second crew member in a cramped compartment in the rear. Two of these served with Kommando Bonow, a Luftflotte Reich experimental test unit. Operations began in March 1945, but the aircraft was unsuitable for night fighting and no kills were made.

=== Ar 234C ===
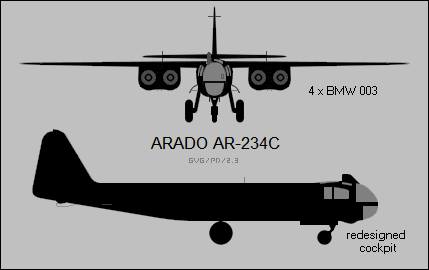
Two-view silhouette of basic Ar 234C design

The Ar 234C was equipped with four lighter (625 kg (1,378 lb) apiece) BMW 003A engines mounted in a pair of twin-engine nacelles based on those from the eighth prototype. The primary reason for this switch was to free up Junkers Jumo 004s for the Me 262, but it also improved takeoff power to nearly (31,300 N (7,040 lbf)). An improved cockpit, with a slightly bulged outline in the upper contour, and integrating a swept-back fairing for the periscope, and a simplified window design with 13 glazed panels reduced to 8. The BMW jet engines improved top speed by about 20% over the B series airframes.

The C-1 was intended for reconnaissance, the C-2 for bombing, and the C-3 for bombing, ground attack (using anti-personnel bombs) or night fighting (with two additional 20mm MG 151/20s in a forward firing ventral pack).

During October 1944, the prototype Ar 234 V19 performed its first flight. Although an operational test squadron was being prepared, only 14 C-series airframes were completed by the end of the war, with fewer than half having engines. Some were found at the end of the war sitting in the open, complete but for empty engine nacelles. (Note: Only about 500 BMW 003 jet engines were built, most of which were assigned to Heinkel He 162 Spatz emergency fighters) Flight testing of the new sub-type hadn't started yet when Germany surrendered. Three basic variants of the C-series were planned, with several more laid out as detailed proposals. Some of these would have had a pair of the higher thrust, but 950 kg (2,090 lb) heavier Heinkel HeS 011 jet engines, while others were to have swept or "crescent"-type wings.

=== Ar 234D ===
The D model was intended to be a two-seat aircraft based on the B-series fuselage, but with an enlarged cockpit using fewer glazing panels than the C version, powered by a pair of more powerful Heinkel HeS 011 turbojet engines. The HeS 011 powerplant never reached quantity production; only 10 examples had been started.

=== Ar 234P ===
The P model was intended to be a two-seat night fighter version with a variant of the D-series cockpit, differing in powerplant options and several options of radar. Several were in the planning stage, but none were produced.

== Operational history ==
By 1944, the Luftwaffe's bombing capability had been severely reduced by attrition across multiple fronts, and despite the advance offered by the pending arrival of production Ar 234s, there was a shortage of experienced pilots. The first unit-level type conversion orders were issued to III/KG 76 in May 1944 and personnel had to be pulled from the front lines and brought to central Germany for aircraft and engine familiarisation, which was facilitated with two-seat Messerschmitt Me 262s.

Challenges were encountered getting the Ar 234 operational, including poor quality of worksmanship, and severe shortages of certain resources, such as fuel. The reliability of the Jumo 004 engines would worsen over time, a trend attributed to using ill-suited fuels. The engines suffered from frequent flameouts and had to be overhauled or replaced after roughly ten hours of operation, although as ground crews became more skilled, the time needed to swap engines was reduced. The aircraft's lengthy takeoff runs were responsible for several accidents and attempts at resolution included improvements to pilot training and the use of jettisonable liquid fuel Starthilfe rocket-assisted takeoff units, mounted under each outer wing. Accidents would often be fatal due to the lack of an ejection seat, the pilot instead having to exit via the highly impractical hatch above the cockpit.

During August 1944, several of Ar 234 prototypes - including six surviving Ar 234A-series prototypes were dispatched on aerial reconnaissance missions. The seventh prototype would perform the first reconnaissance mission over the United Kingdom by a Luftwaffe jet. These reconnaissance flights helped assess the potential for an Allied naval invasion of the Netherlands. Allied piston-engine fighters proved unable to intercept them, being incapable of matching their speed and altitude.

The first Ar 234Bs began entering service during the autumn of 1944. Early missions included attacks in the Low Countries, on the Antwerp docks and a Brussels railway station. The type was used directly against Allied units during the Battle of the Bulge, and in January 1945 Ar 234s attacked artillery positions to the north of Bastogne. One month later, the Allies were able to capture an Ar 234 which had been forced down by a Republic P-47 Thunderbolt. The type also saw action in Northern Italy.

Perhaps the most notable use of the Ar 234 in the bomber role was the attempt to destroy the Ludendorff Bridge at Remagen. Between 7 March, when it was captured by the Allies, and 17 March, when it finally collapsed, the bridge was continually attacked by III/KG 76 Ar 234s carrying 1,000 kg (2,200 lb) bombs. Most attacks missed the bridge, and heavy losses were experienced from ground-based anti-aircraft guns due to the low altitude these attacks were made from.

By 10 April 1945, 38 operational Ar 234s were reportedly on strength, including 24 reconnaissance aircraft, 12 bombers, and two night-fighters. However, most of these sat waiting for fuel and qualified personnel.

The Ar 234 continued to fly combat missions until the surrender of Germany on 8 May 1945. Several were destroyed by anti-aircraft guns, or "bounced" by Allied fighters during takeoff or on landing when the jets were flying slow and straight, and were most vulnerable. This technique had already been used against Messerschmitt Me 262 jets. Many were captured by the Allies.

== Variants ==
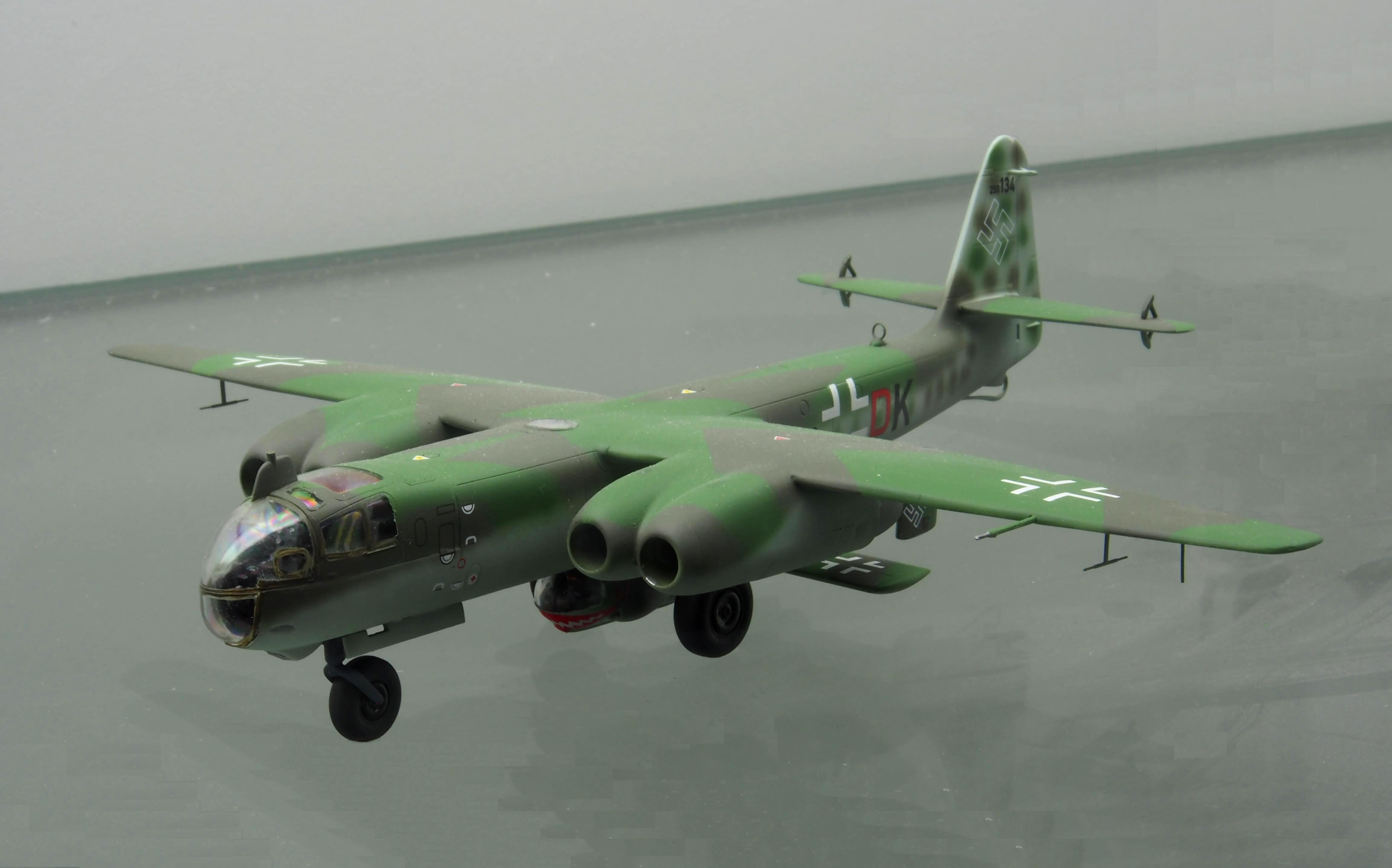
Model of an Arado Ar 234 V21 carrying an Arado E.381 at the Technikmuseum Speyer

Data from: Aircraft of the Third Reich Vol.1

Arado E 370
Draft proposal submitted to the Reichsluftfahrtministerium (RLM) for a fast jet reconnaissance bomber.

Ar 234 V1 to V5
Initial prototypes of the Ar 234A with skid landing gear, take-off tricycle gear trolley with trio of retractable landing skids, and two Jumo 004 engines.

Ar 234 V6 & V8
Prototypes for four-engined designs for the Ar 234, meant to use the alternative choice of the lower-thrust BMW 003 turbojet engines while retaining the A model skid/trolley undercarriage. The V6 was fitted with the quartet of BMW 003s in individual nacelles, unlike the V8 prototype which had the BMW jet engines in a pair of "twinned" nacelles, and essentially "prototyped" what would become the four-engined Ar 234C's engine installation.

Ar 234 V7
Development aircraft for the Ar 234B production aircraft, retaining the A-series' intended skid undercarriage, and saw active service.

Ar 234 V9 to V11
Representative prototypes of the Ar 234B production aircraft, with the V9 being the first airframe with retractable tricycle undercarriage.

Ar 234 V13 & V20
A pair of B-series prototypes fitted with four BMW 109-003 engines intended for the C-series aircraft, using the V8 prototype's "twinned" nacelle design, but without retractable wing-skids.

Ar 234 V15
A single B-series airframe fitted with 2 x BMW 003 engines for engine development testing, and rumored to have been considered for new wing planform tests.

Ar 234 V21 to V30
C-series development aircraft. V26 and V30 had experimental thick section wooden and thin section metal laminar flow wings.

Ar 234 V16
Intended to be fitted with an experimental crescent wing with sweep back lessening towards the tips, evolved by Rüdiger Kosin and Walther Lehmann. The wing was constructed but was destroyed before it could be fitted.

Ar 234 A
The first proposed production reconnaissance bomber fitted with skid undercarriage and take-off tricycle gear trolley, built only as the series of eight trolley-and-skid undercarriage V1 through V8 prototypes.

Ar 234 B-0
20 pre-production aircraft.

Ar 234 B-1
Reconnaissance version, equipped with two Rb 50/30 or Rb 75/30 cameras. All reconnaissance variants were converted from B-2 aircraft with Rüstsatz b.

Ar 234 B-1 Berlin N
Two-engined aircraft, this was a wind tunnel test aircraft based on Ar 234 B-1 with FuG 244 Berlin N radar installed on top. The purpose of this plane was to be an early warning jet and also a fighter control jet.

Ar 234 B-2
Bomber version, with a maximum bombload of 1,500 kg (3,307 lb).

Ar 234 B-2/N
Night fighter version, two aircraft converted from B-2.

Ar 234 C-1
Four-engined aircraft – all C-series Ar 234s powered with a quartet of BMW 003 jet engines – as installed on the Ar 234 V8 prototype, otherwise similar to the Ar 234 B-1.

Ar 234 C-2
Four-engined aircraft similar to the Ar 234 B-2.

Ar 234 C-3
Multi-purpose version, armed with two 20 mm MG 151/20 cannons beneath the nose.

Ar 234 C-3/N
Proposed two-seat night fighter version, armed with two forward-firing 20 mm MG 151/20 and two 30 mm (1.18 in) MK 108 cannons, fitted with a mid-VHF band FuG 218 Neptun V radar.

Ar 234 C-4
Armed reconnaissance version, fitted with two cameras, armed with four 20 mm MG 151/20 cannon.

Ar 234 C-5
Proposed version with side-by-side seating for the crew. The 31st prototype was converted into this variant.

Ar 234 C-5 Berlin N
Proposed C-5 with a FuG 244 Berlin-N rotating radar dish on top of the plane, for early warning and fighter control role

Ar 234 C-6
Proposed two-seat reconnaissance aircraft. The 32nd prototype was converted into this variant.

Ar 234 C-7
Night fighter version, with side-by-side seating for the crew, fitted with an enhanced FuG 245 Bremen O cavity magnetron-based centimetric (30 GHz) radar.

Ar 234 C-8
Proposed single-seat bomber version, powered by two 1,080 kg (2,380 lb) Jumo 004D turbojet engines.

Ar 234 D-1
Proposed reconnaissance version. Not built.

Ar 234 D-2
Proposed bomber version. Not built.

Ar 234 P-1
Two-seater with four BMW 003A-1 engines; one 20 mm MG 151/20 and one 30 mm (1.18 in) MK 108.

Ar 234 P-2
Also a two-seater, with redesigned cockpit protected by a 13 mm (0.51 in) armour plate.

Ar 234 P-3
HeS 011A powered P-2, but with two cannon.

Ar 234P-4
as P-3 but with Jumo 004D engines.

Ar 234P-5
Three-seat version with HeS 011A engines, one 20 mm MG 151/20 and four 30 mm (1.18 in) MK 108 cannon.

Ar 234 R
Rocket-powered short range high-altitude reconnaissance version It had a rocket engine in its tail, while the turbojets had been discarded. It would be towed by a He 177 to 8 km altitude after which it would propel itself to 17 km altitude over the target after which it would glide back unpowered. Project only.

== Operators ==
Nazi Germany

- Luftwaffe
  - 1./Versuchsverband OKL, headquarters unit
  - Sonderkommando Götz, two prototype aircraft, was then increased in size and became;
  - Sonderkommando Sperling, carried reconnaissance on Western front and UK and helped to train crews of;
  - 1./Fernaufklärungsgruppe (FAGr) 123 (long distance reconnaissance unit)
  - Sonderkommando Hecht, carried out reconnaissance of southern portion of Western Front and also intended to train crews of;
  - 1./FAGr 100 (reconnaissance unit)
  - Sonderkommando Sommer, carried out reconnaissance in Italy and also intended to train crews of;
  - 1./FAGr 33 (reconnaissance unit)
  - Sonderkommando Bonow, (night fighter unit)
  - Kampfgeschwader 76 (bomber unit)

== Surviving aircraft ==
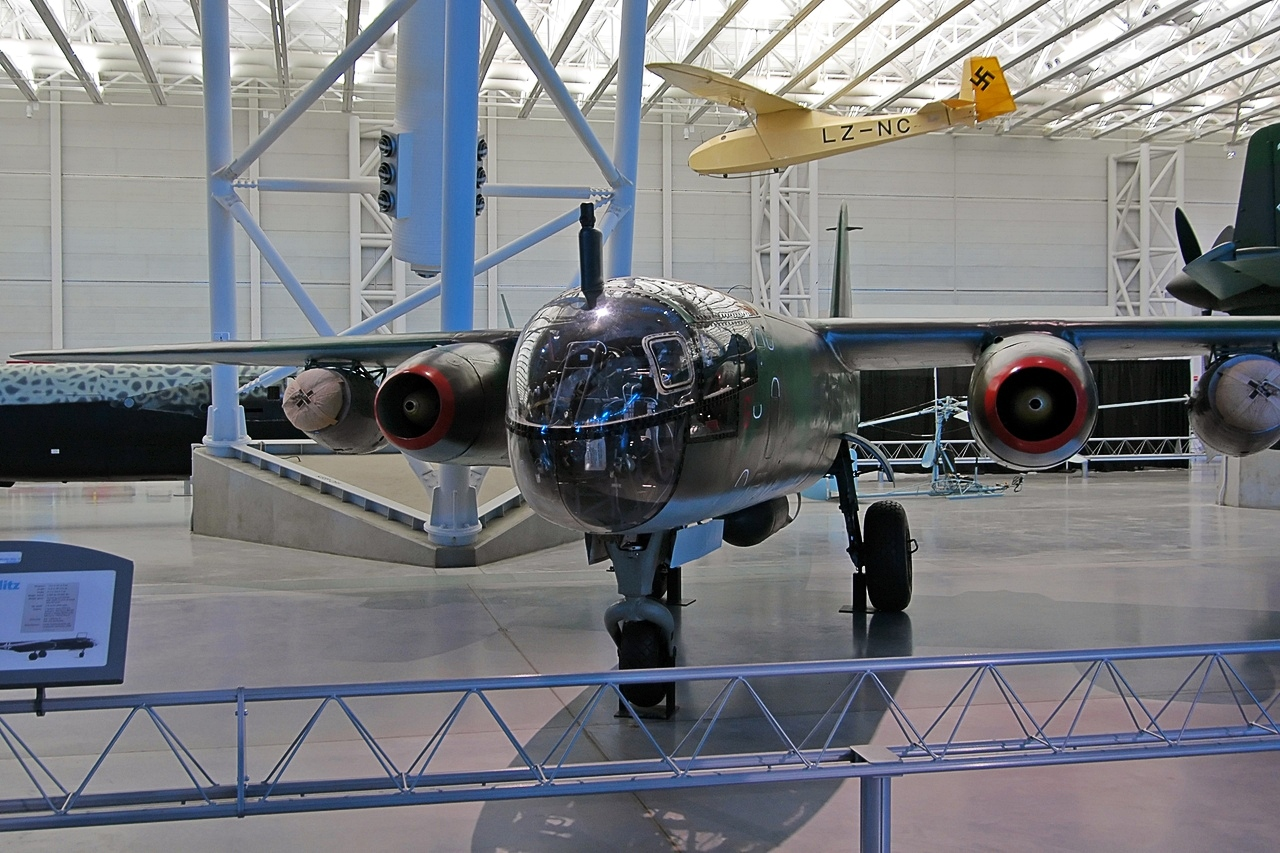
140312 on display at the Steven F. Udvar-Hazy Center in 2007

Only one Ar 234 survives today, a B-2 bomber variant with manufacturer's serial number 140312. It was one of nine Ar 234s surrendered to British forces at Sola Airfield near Stavanger, Norway. The aircraft had been operating with 8. Staffel III./Kampfgeschwader 76 (later reorganised as Einsatzstaffel) during the final weeks of the war, having operated previously with the 8th squadron, carrying the full-four-character Geschwaderkennung military code "F1+GS" on the fuselage sides, with the wing code "F1" painted in a much reduced size for late-war "low-visibility" requirements.

Teams of the USAAF's Operation Lusty were collecting examples of Luftwaffe technology for study. This aircraft and three others were traded to Operation Lusty by Eric "Winkle" Brown (test pilot and commanding officer of the Enemy Aircraft Flight at the Royal Aircraft Establishment) in exchange for an interview with Hermann Göring who was then being held by the Americans.

The aircraft was flown from Sola to Cherbourg in France on 24 June 1945 where it joined 34 other German aircraft to be shipped to the U.S. aboard the British aircraft carrier HMS Reaper. Reaper departed from Cherbourg on 20 July and arrived at Newark, New Jersey in the United States eight days later. Upon arrival two of the Ar 234s were reassembled (including 140312) and flown by USAAF pilots to Freeman Army Airfield, Indiana, US for testing and evaluation. 140312 was assigned the foreign equipment number FE-1010. The fate of the second Ar 234 flown to Freeman Field remains a mystery. One of the remaining two was reassembled by the United States Navy at Naval Air Station Patuxent River, Maryland, for testing, but was found to be in unflyable condition and scrapped.

After receiving new engines, radio and oxygen equipment, 140312 was transferred to Wright Field near Dayton, Ohio, US and delivered to the Accelerated Service Test Maintenance Squadron of the Flight Test Division in July 1946. Flight testing was completed on 16 October 1946 though the aircraft remained at Wright Field until 1947. It was then transferred to Orchard Place Airport in Park Ridge, Illinois, and remained there until 1 May 1949 when it and several other aircraft stored at the airport were transferred to the Smithsonian Institution. During the early 1950s, the Ar 234 was moved to the Smithsonian's Paul Garber Restoration Facility at Suitland, Maryland for storage and eventual restoration.

The Smithsonian began restoring 140312 in 1984 and finished in February 1989. All paint had been stripped from the aircraft before the Smithsonian received it, so the aircraft was painted with the markings of an aircraft of 8./KG 76, the first operational unit to fly the "Blitz". The final Luftwaffe pilot who flew 140312 prior to Germany's surrender in World War II, Willi Kriessmann, was reunited with the aircraft in 1990; Kriessmann also donated his flight logs to the Smithsonian around that time. The restored aircraft was first displayed at the Smithsonian's main museum building in 1993 as part of a display titled "Wonder Weapon? The Arado Ar 234".

In 2005, 140312 became one of the first aircraft moved to the new Steven F. Udvar-Hazy Center near Dulles International Airport in Virginia, United States. Today, 140312 is displayed next to the last surviving Dornier Do 335, one of the other aircraft that accompanied it on its voyage across the Atlantic Ocean aboard the Reaper. 140312 is displayed with a pair of Starthilfe RATO units mounted under its wings. These may be the only surviving examples to be mounted on an aircraft design that actually used them during the conflict.

== Specifications (Ar 234B-2) ==
Technical drawing of an Ar 234B

Data from Aircraft of the Third Reich, vol. 1.

General characteristics

- Crew: 1
- Length: 12.64 m (41 ft 6 in)
- Wingspan: 14.41 m (47 ft 3 in)
- Height: 4.29 m (14 ft 1 in)
- Wing area: 26.4 m^{2} (284 sq ft)
- Empty weight: 5,200 kg (11,464 lb)
- Max takeoff weight: 9,800 kg (21,605 lb)
- Powerplant: 2 × Junkers Jumo 004B-1 axial-flow turbojet engines, 8.83 kN (1,990 lbf) thrust each
- Powerplant: 2 × Walter HWK 109-500A-1 Starthilfe liquid-fuelled jettisonable JATO rocket pods, 4.905 kN (1,103 lbf) thrust each (optional)

Performance

- Maximum speed: 742 km/h (461 mph, 401 kn) at 6,000 m (20,000 ft)
- Cruise speed: 700 km/h (430 mph, 380 kn) at 6,000 m (20,000 ft)
- Range: 1,556 km (967 mi, 840 nmi) with 500 kg (1,100 lb) bomb load
- Service ceiling: 10,000 m (33,000 ft)
- Rate of climb: 13 m/s (2,600 ft/min)

Armament

- Bombs: up to 1,500 kg (3,300 lb) of disposable stores on external racks

== See also ==
Related development

- Arado E.560

Aircraft of comparable role, configuration, and era

- English Electric Canberra
- Heinkel He 343
- Ilyushin Il-22
- Junkers Ju 287
- North American B-45 Tornado

Related lists

- List of aircraft of World War II
- List of bomber aircraft
- List of aircraft of Germany in World War II
- List of World War II jet aircraft
