= Walter HWK 109-500 =

1940s German aircraft rocket engine

HWK 109-500
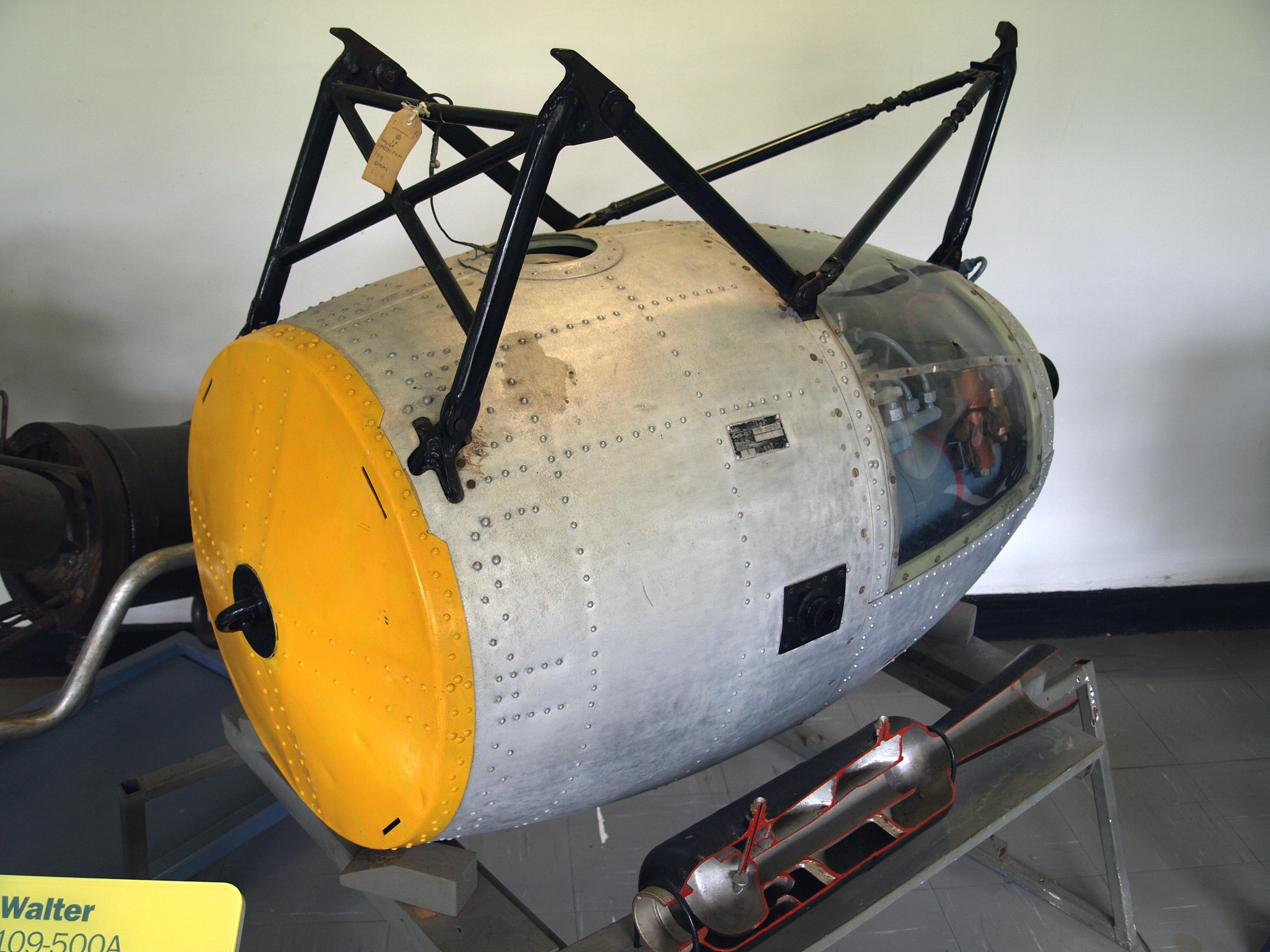
- HWK 109-500 on display at the Royal Air Force Museum Cosford
- Type: Liquid-propellant rocket (assist unit)
- Manufacturer: Hellmuth Walter Kommanditgesellschaft
- Number built: 6,000

The Walter HWK 109-500 was a liquid-fuelled rocket engine developed by Walter in Germany during the Second World War.

== Description ==
The 109-500 is a self-contained, modular monopropellant Starthilfe (take-off assist) engine in a pod, able to produce 500 kg (1,100 lb) thrust for thirty seconds. After the fuel was expended, the pod was jettisoned and it returned to earth by parachute, with the parachute packed externally, onto the blunt forward end of the pod.

The T-Stoff monopropellant, stored in the large spherical tank within the Starthilfe module's forward end, needed to react with a catalyst to provide the boosting thrust for an aircraft on takeoff - this Z-Stoff sodium or calcium-based, alkaline permanganate-compound (in an aqueous solution) catalyst was provided in a small tank above the reaction chamber just forward of the exhaust nozzle, with compressed air from a network of five pressure tanks driving the monopropellant and catalyst together through the reaction chamber, which featured an internal, fixed helical "swirl baffle" to lengthen the period of time the monopropellant and catalyst were in contact for a more complete catalytic reaction within it, before the reacted T-Stoff exhaust exited the nozzle.

It entered service in 1942, and some 6,000 were built, by Heinkel. It was "used extensively on a wide range of aircraft", especially the potentially underpowered (when heavily laden with external ordnance) Jumo 004-engined Arado Ar 234B, with two of the units uniquely displayed as mounted operationally on the NASM's sole surviving, restored Ar 234B.

== Variants ==
The HWK 109-501 was a higher-thrust variant (14.71 kN) bipropellant Starthilfe RATO booster unit, used on the Junkers Ju 287 prototype which proved to be unreliable over sustained periods.

== Applications ==
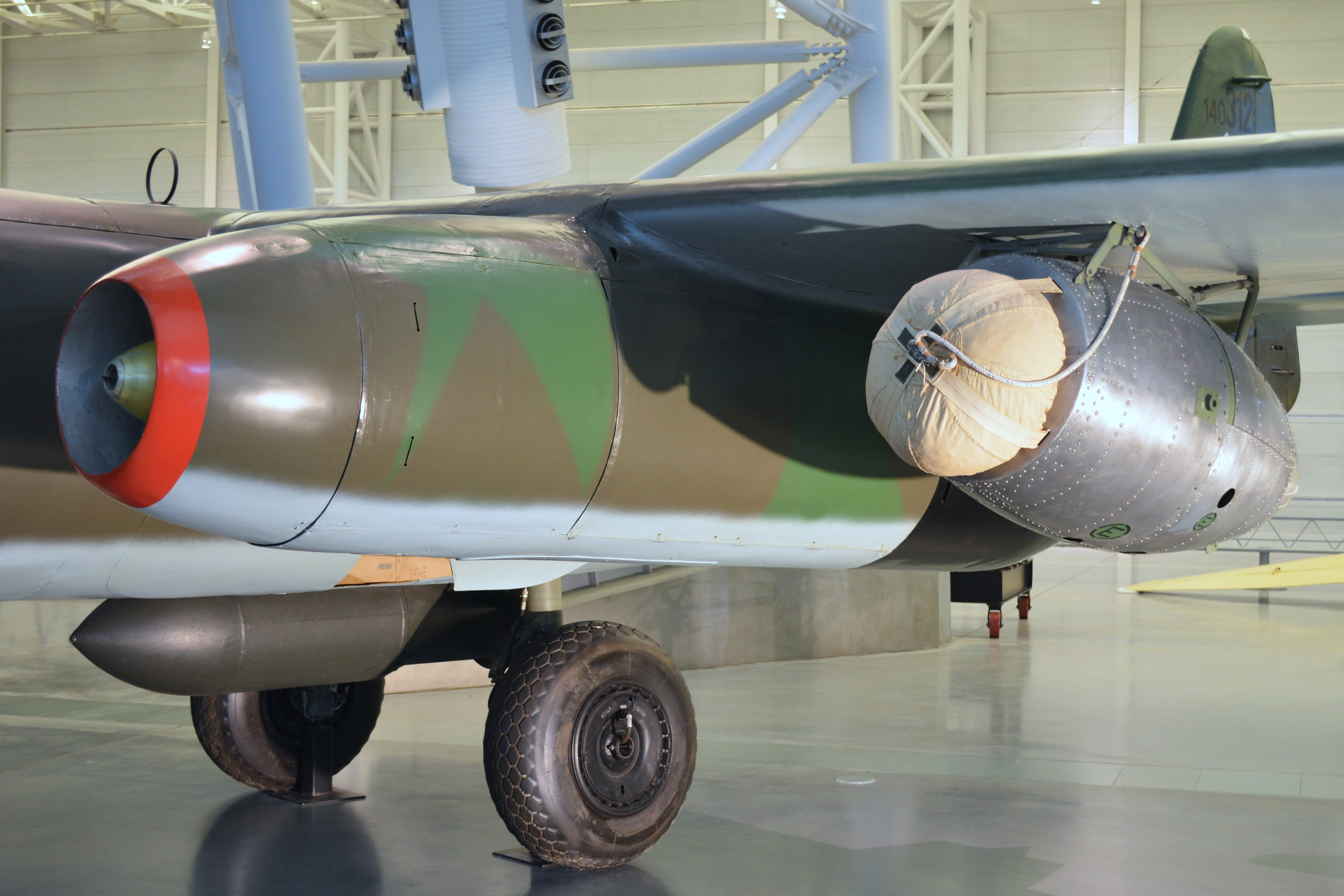
HWK 109-500 mounted on an Arado Ar 234

- Arado Ar 234
- Blohm & Voss BV 138
- Junkers Ju 88
- Junkers Ju 287
- Heinkel He 111
- Messerschmitt Me 321
- Messerschmitt Me 323

== Specifications ==
Data from The race for Hitler's X-planes : Britain's 1945 mission to capture secret Luftwaffe technology, Die Deutsche Luftruestung 1933–1945 Vol.4 – Flugzeugtypen MIAG-Zeppelin

==== General characteristics ====
- Type: Liquid propellant rocket
- Length:
- Diameter:
- Dry weight: 125 kg (276 lb)
- Loaded weight: 250 kg (550 lb)

==== Components ====
- Compressor:
- Combustors: catalytic decomposition of hydrogen peroxide (80% H_{2}O_{2}) in a single decomposition chamber without combustion.
- Fuel type: T-Stoff monopropellant - (80% hydrogen peroxide oxidiser catalysed by Z-Stoff permanganate catalyst)

==== Performance ====
- Maximum thrust: 4.90 kN (1,102 lbf)
- Thrust-to-weight ratio: 2 loaded; 4 at exhaustion

== See also ==
- Walter HWK 109-507 guided ordnance booster rocket module

Related lists

- List of aircraft engines
- List of aircraft engines of Germany during World War II
