= BMW 117 =

1930s German piston aircraft engine

The BMW 117 was a piston aircraft engine developed by BMW in the 1930s. Development work stopped in 1937. The BMW 117 engine was initially known as the BMW XV.

== Specifications (BMW 117) ==
=== General characteristics ===
- Type: V12
- Bore: 155.6 mm (6.13 in)
- Stroke: 158 mm (6.22 in)
- Displacement: 36 L (2,196.85 cu in)
- Length: 1,809 mm (71.22 in)
- Width: 740 mm (29.1 in)
- Height: 985 mm (38.8 in)
- Dry weight: 525 kg (1,157 lb)

=== Components ===
- Supercharger: radial supercharger
- Fuel system: injection
- Cooling system: Liquid cooled

=== Performance ===
- Power output: 905 hp (675 kW) at 2320 rpm
- Compression ratio: 6.5:1

== See also ==
Related lists

- List of aircraft engines
- List of aircraft engines of Germany during World War II

== Bibliography ==
- Pierer, Christian; Jakobs, Fred; Kröschel, Robert (2009). BMW aero engines milestones in aviation from the beginnings to the present (in German). Königswinter: Heel. ISBN 978-3-86852-214-3.
