= Hellmuth Walter Kommanditgesellschaft =

German company

Hellmuth Walter Kommanditgesellschaft (HWK), Helmuth Walter Werke (HWM), or commonly known as the Walter-Werke, was a German company founded by Professor Hellmuth Walter to pursue his interest in engines using hydrogen peroxide as a propellant.

Having experimented with torpedoes and submarines, Walter began to design rocket engines for aircraft and founded the HWK in Kiel in 1935.

During World War II the HWK developed and built a variety of rocket engines for assisted take-off (RATO), and guided missiles, before developing main propulsion engines for rocket-powered interceptor aircraft, notably the Messerschmitt Me 163 Komet and the Bachem Ba 349 Natter.

HWM designed the steam catapult that launched the V-1 flying bomb. The steam was generated through the combination of T-Stoff and Z-Stoff.

The company was wound up in 1945 and Walter subsequently continued his work in the United States.

== See also ==
- C-Stoff – another chemical fuel developed by HWK
- Walter HWK 109-500 – RATO-podded Starthilfe, self-contained booster rocket engine unit
- Walter HWK 109-509 – Germany's primary aircraft rocket engine
- Gotha Go 242 – rocket-assisted glider
- Heinkel He 176 – rocket aircraft
- Henschel Hs 293 - radio-controlled rocket-assisted anti-ship glide-bomb
- DFS 228 – rocket aircraft
- DFS 346 – rocket aircraft
- HMS Meteorite – HTP-powered submarine
