= C-Stoff =

German rocket fuel

C-Stoff ([t͡seː ʃtɔf]; "substance C") was a reductant used in bipropellant rocket fuels (as a fuel itself) developed by Hellmuth Walter Kommanditgesellschaft in Germany during World War II. It was developed for use with T-Stoff (a high-test peroxide) as an oxidizer, which together with C-Stoff as the fuel, forms a hypergolic mixture.

Methanol	CH_{3}OH	~57% by weight
Hydrazine hydrate	N_{2}H_{4} · H_{2}O	~30% by weight
Water	H_{2}O	~13% by weight
Catalyst 431	K_{3}[Cu(CN)_{4}]	potassium tetracyanocuprate(I)

The proportions of the components in C-Stoff were developed to catalyse the decomposition of T-Stoff, promote combustion with the oxygen released by the decomposition, and sustain uniform combustion through sufficient quantity of the highly reactive hydrazine. The combination of the C-Stoff, used as a rocket fuel, with the T-Stoff used as the oxidizer, often resulted in spontaneous explosion from their combined nature as a hypergolic fuel combination, necessitating strict hygiene in fueling operations; there were numerous catastrophic explosions of the Messerschmitt Me 163 aircraft that employed this fuel system. Another hazard was toxicity to humans of each of the propellants.

== C-fuel ==
After the war, Allied studies into rocket propellants continued with engines such as the Armstrong Siddeley Beta, under the name "C-fuel".

== See also ==
- List of stoffs
- UDMH
