= Z-Stoff =

Rocket propellant catalyst mixture

Z-Stoff ([t͡sɛt ʃtɔf], "substance Z") was a name for calcium permanganate or sodium permanganate mixed in water. It was normally used as a catalyst for T-Stoff (high-test peroxide) in military rocket programs by Nazi Germany during World War II.

Z-Stoff was used in the cold engine of the Messerschmitt Me 163A fighter aircraft, in the earlier, self-contained HWK 109-500 Starthilfe RATO booster motor for crewed aircraft (usually in pairs or multiples of two for such uses), and a smaller derivation of the Starthilfe unit, the HWK 109-507 booster engine used with the Henschel Hs 293 anti-ship guided missile. T-Stoff decomposed by Z-Stoff was commonly used by World War II German military to generate steam to drive fuel pumps in aircraft and rockets.

The reaction produces manganese dioxide, which tended to clog the steam generators. Later generations of the Walter Rocket used solid-state catalyst instead of its water solution.

== See also ==
- List of stoffs
