= T-Stoff =

Hydrogen peroxide rocket propellant

T-Stoff ([teː ʃtɔf]; 'substance T') was a stabilised high test peroxide used in Germany during World War II. T-Stoff was specified to contain 80% (occasionally 85%) hydrogen peroxide (H_{2}O_{2}), remainder water, with traces (<0.1%) of stabilisers. Stabilisers used included 0.0025% phosphoric acid, a mixture of phosphoric acid, sodium phosphate and 8-hydroxyquinoline, and sodium stannate.

== Uses ==
The decomposition of T-Stoff into hot steam and oxygen caused by the addition of the catalyst Z-Stoff (an aqueous solution of permanganates) was used to drive the split-tube steam catapults which launched the V-1 flying bomb.

Similarly generated steam was used to drive the turbopump in the German V2 rocket, and the pumps in several other rocket engines. The turbopump was used to transport fuel and oxidizer liquids under pressure to the rocket engine of the V2.

Another of T-Stoff's many uses was to be combined as the oxidizer, with C-Stoff (methanol–hydrazine–water mixture) as the fuel, in the bipropellant Walter HWK 109-509 engine of the Messerschmitt Me 163 and Messerschmitt Me 263, at a ratio of approximately 3.1 parts T-Stoff oxidizer to one part C-Stoff fuel. Because the two substances were so visually similar, a complex testing system was developed to make sure that each propellant was put into the correct tanks of the Messerschmitt Me 163. This was because T-Stoff and C-Stoff are hypergolic propellants: they spontaneously ignite when mixed at normal temperatures. Even slight contamination between the T-Stoff oxidizer and the C-Stoff fuel was likely to cause an explosion.

Catalytic decomposition of T-Stoff by Z-Stoff was also used as a monopropellant in several "cold" Walter rocket engines, including early versions of the engine for the Me 163A, and rocket-assisted takeoff pack engines like the Walter HWK 109-500.

== Danger and precautions ==
Because of its extreme oxidizing potential, T-Stoff was a very dangerous chemical to handle, so special rubberized suits were required when working with it, as it would react with most cloth, leather, or other combustible material and cause it to spontaneously combust. T-Stoff corroded iron and steel, and thus had to be kept in aluminium tanks. Conversely, C-Stoff ate through aluminium and had to be kept in glass or enamel. T-Stoff containers were white, C-Stoff containers were yellow. The tanker trucks carrying T-Stoff and C-Stoff, clearly marked "T" and "C" were forbidden to come within 800 meters of each other.

An illustration of the extreme hazard posed by T-Stoff is the grisly story of an ME-163 test pilot, Josef Pöhs. Upon a "sharp start" takeoff at the end of December 1943, the wheeled dolly bounced when jettisoned and hit the Komet, causing a fuel leak. Pöhs maintained enough control for a survivable crash landing, but was knocked unconscious. When the rescue crew arrived, they found Pöhs disintegrated by the leaking T-Stoff that had entered the cockpit.

== See also ==
- Dinitrogen tetroxide
- List of stoffs
