= Calcium permanganate =

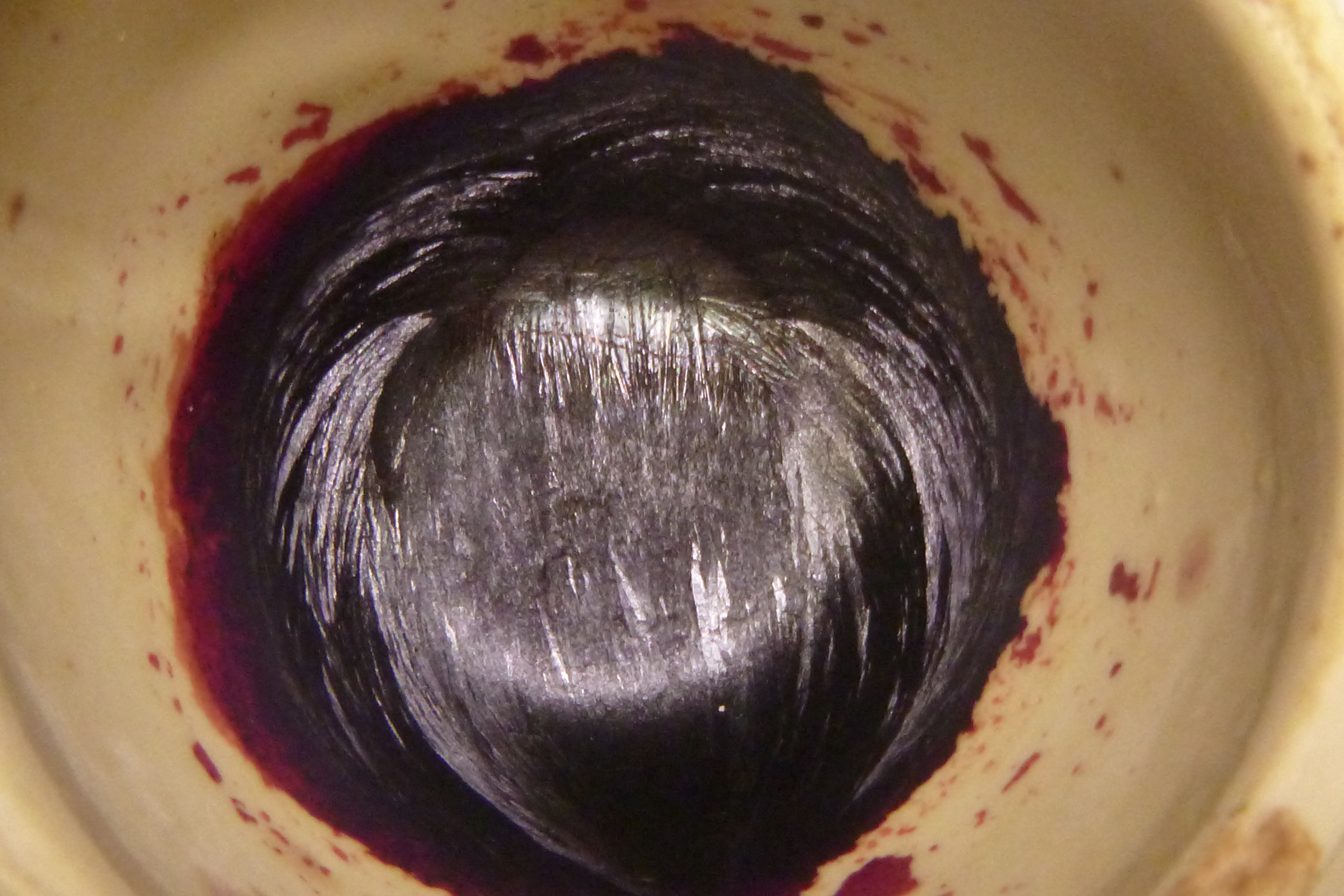

Names
- IUPAC name Calcium dipermanganate

Identifiers
CAS Number	10118-76-0
3D model (JSmol)	Interactive image
ChemSpider	23333
ECHA InfoCard	100.030.280
EC Number	233-322-7
PubChem CID	24959
RTECS number	EW3860000
UNII	720Y4E8F5H
CompTox Dashboard (EPA)	DTXSID001015791
- InChI: InChI=1S/Ca.2Mn.8O/q+2;;;;;;;;;2*-1 Key: HYSMCTNXSYZEHS-UHFFFAOYSA-N; InChI=1/Ca.2Mn.8O/q+2;;;;;;;;;2*-1/rCa.2MnO4/c;2*2-1(3,4)5/q+2;2*-1 Key: HYSMCTNXSYZEHS-KTXORSEZAZ
- SMILES: [Ca+2].O=[Mn](=O)(=O)[O-].[O-][Mn](=O)(=O)=O

Properties
Chemical formula	Ca(MnO_{4})_{2}
Molar mass	277.9493 g/mol
Appearance	purple crystals deliquesent
Density	2.49 g/cm^{3}
Melting point	140 °C (284 °F; 413 K) (decomposes, tetrahydrate)
Solubility in water	tetrahydrate: 331 g/100 mL (14 °C); 338 g/100 mL (25 °C)
Solubility	soluble in ammonium hydroxide decomposes in alcohol

Related compounds
Other cations	Sodium permanganate Ammonium permanganate
- Except where otherwise noted, data are given for materials in their standard state (at 25 °C [77 °F], 100 kPa). verify (what is ?) Infobox references

Calcium permanganate is an oxidizing agent and chemical compound with the chemical formula Ca(MnO_{4})_{2}. This salt consists of the metal calcium and two permanganate ions.

== Preparation ==
The salt is prepared from the reaction of potassium permanganate with calcium chloride or from the reaction of aluminium permanganate with calcium oxide. It can also be prepared by reacting manganese dioxide with a solution of calcium hypochlorite and a little bit of calcium hydroxide to increase the pH level.

== Uses ==
Calcium permanganate is used in the textile industry, for sterilization of water, and as a deodorizer. It is believed to help whiten teeth. It was formerly used as a component of rocket fuel by the Luftwaffe.

== Safety ==
It is noncombustible, but being a strong oxidizing agent, it will accelerate the burning of combustible material. If the combustible material is finely divided, the resulting mixture may be explosive. Contact with liquid combustible materials may result in spontaneous ignition. Contact with sulfuric acid may cause fires or explosions. Mixtures with acetic acid or acetic anhydride can explode if not kept cold. Explosions can occur when mixtures of calcium permanganate and sulfuric acid come into contact with benzene, carbon disulfide, diethyl ether, ethyl alcohol, petroleum, or other organic matter.

== See also ==
- Potassium permanganate
- Sodium permanganate
- Ammonium permanganate
