= Messerschmitt Me 163 Komet =

German rocket-powered interceptor

Me 163 Komet
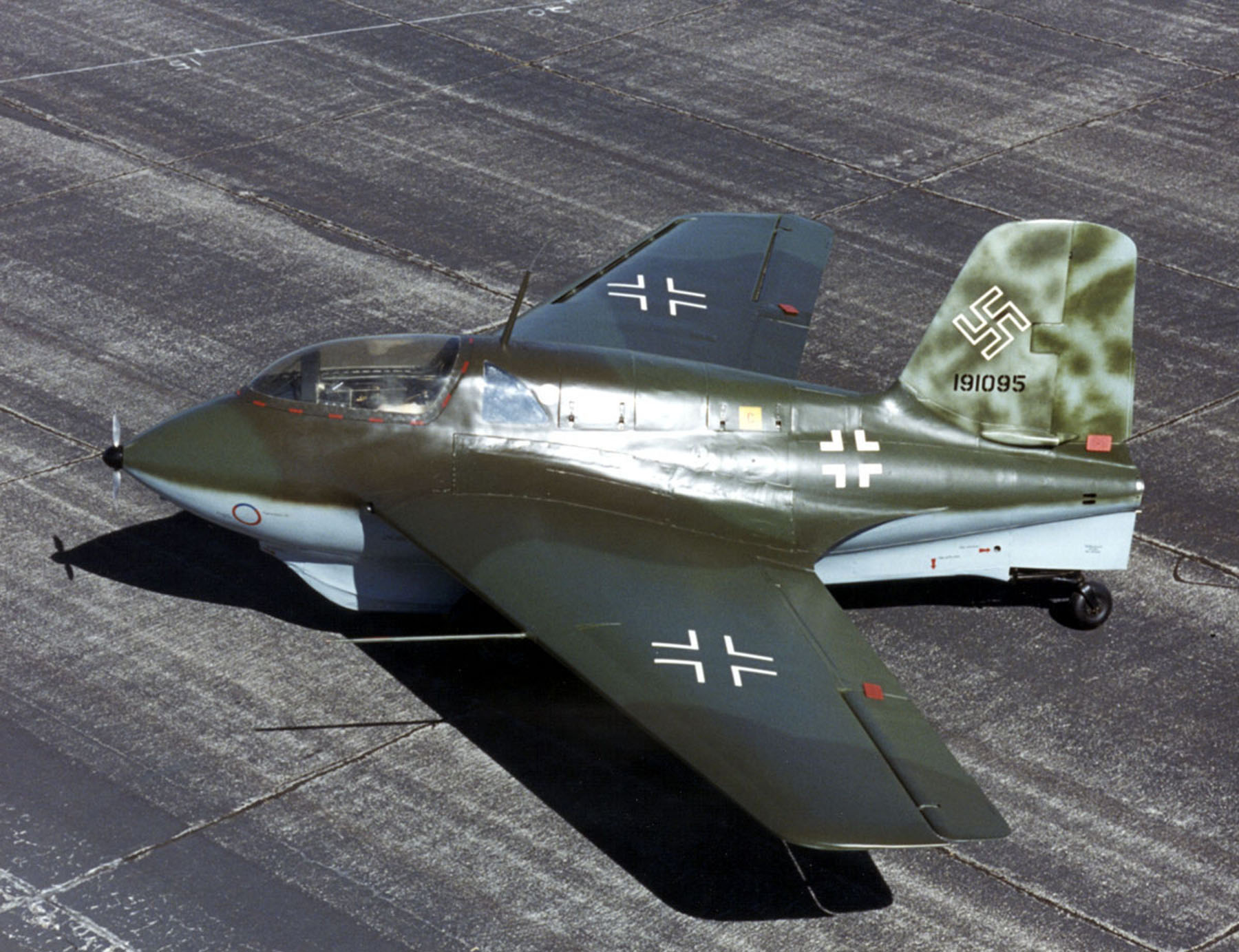
- Me 163B on display at the National Museum of the United States Air Force (Note: The small red rectangles on the rudder and elevons are externally fastened gust locks to prevent wind damage to the control surfaces while on the ground and are removed before flight.)

General information
- Type: Rocket Interceptor
- National origin: Germany
- Manufacturer: Messerschmitt
- Designer: Alexander Lippisch
- Primary user: Luftwaffe
- Number built: ~370

History
- Introduction date: 1944
- First flight: 1 September 1941
- Developed into: Messerschmitt Me 263; Mitsubishi J8M Shūsui

The Messerschmitt Me 163 Komet is a rocket-powered interceptor aircraft primarily designed and produced by the German aircraft manufacturer Messerschmitt. It is the only operational rocket-powered fighter aircraft in history as well as the first piloted aircraft of any type to exceed 1,000 kilometres per hour (540 knots) in level flight.

Development of what would become the Me 163 can be traced back to 1937 and the work of the German aeronautical engineer Alexander Lippisch and the Deutsche Forschungsanstalt für Segelflug (DFS). Initially an experimental programme that drew upon traditional glider designs while integrating various new innovations such as the rocket engine, the development ran into organisational issues until Lippisch and his team were transferred to Messerschmitt in January 1939. Plans for a propeller-powered intermediary aircraft were quickly dropped in favour of proceeding directly to rocket propulsion. On 1 September 1941, the prototype performed its maiden flight, quickly demonstrating its unprecedented performance and the qualities of its design. Having been suitably impressed, German officials quickly enacted plans that aimed for the widespread introduction of Me 163 point-defence interceptors across Germany. During December 1941, work began on the upgraded Me 163B, which was optimized for large-scale production.

During early July 1944, German test pilot Heini Dittmar reached 1,130 km/h (700 mph), an unofficial flight airspeed record that remained unmatched by turbojet-powered aircraft until 1953. That same year, the Me 163 began flying operational missions, being typically used to defend against incoming enemy bombing raids. As part of their alliance with the Empire of Japan, Germany provided design schematics and a single Me 163 to the country; this led to the development of the Mitsubishi J8M. By the end of the conflict, roughly 370 Komets had been completed, most of which were being used operationally. Some of the aircraft's shortcomings were never addressed, and it was less effective in combat than predicted. Capable of a maximum of 7.5 minutes of powered flight, its range fell short of projections and greatly limited its potential. Efforts to improve the aircraft were made (most notably the development of the Messerschmitt Me 263), but many of these did not see actual combat due to the sustained advance of the Allied powers into Germany in 1945.

After being introduced into service the Me 163 was credited with the destruction of between 9 and 18 Allied aircraft against 10 losses. Aside from combat losses, numerous Me 163 pilots were killed upon takeoff or during testing and training flights. This high loss rate was, at least partially, a result of the later models' use of rocket propellant which was not only highly volatile but also corrosive and hazardous to humans. One noteworthy fatality was that of Josef Pöhs, a German fighter ace and Oberleutnant in the Luftwaffe, who was killed in 1943 through exposure to T-Stoff in combination with injuries sustained during a failed takeoff that ruptured a fuel line. Besides Nazi Germany, no nation ever made operational use of the Me 163; the only other operational rocket-powered aircraft was the Japanese Yokosuka MXY-7 Ohka which was a manned flying bomb.

== Development ==
=== Early work by Alexander Lippisch ===
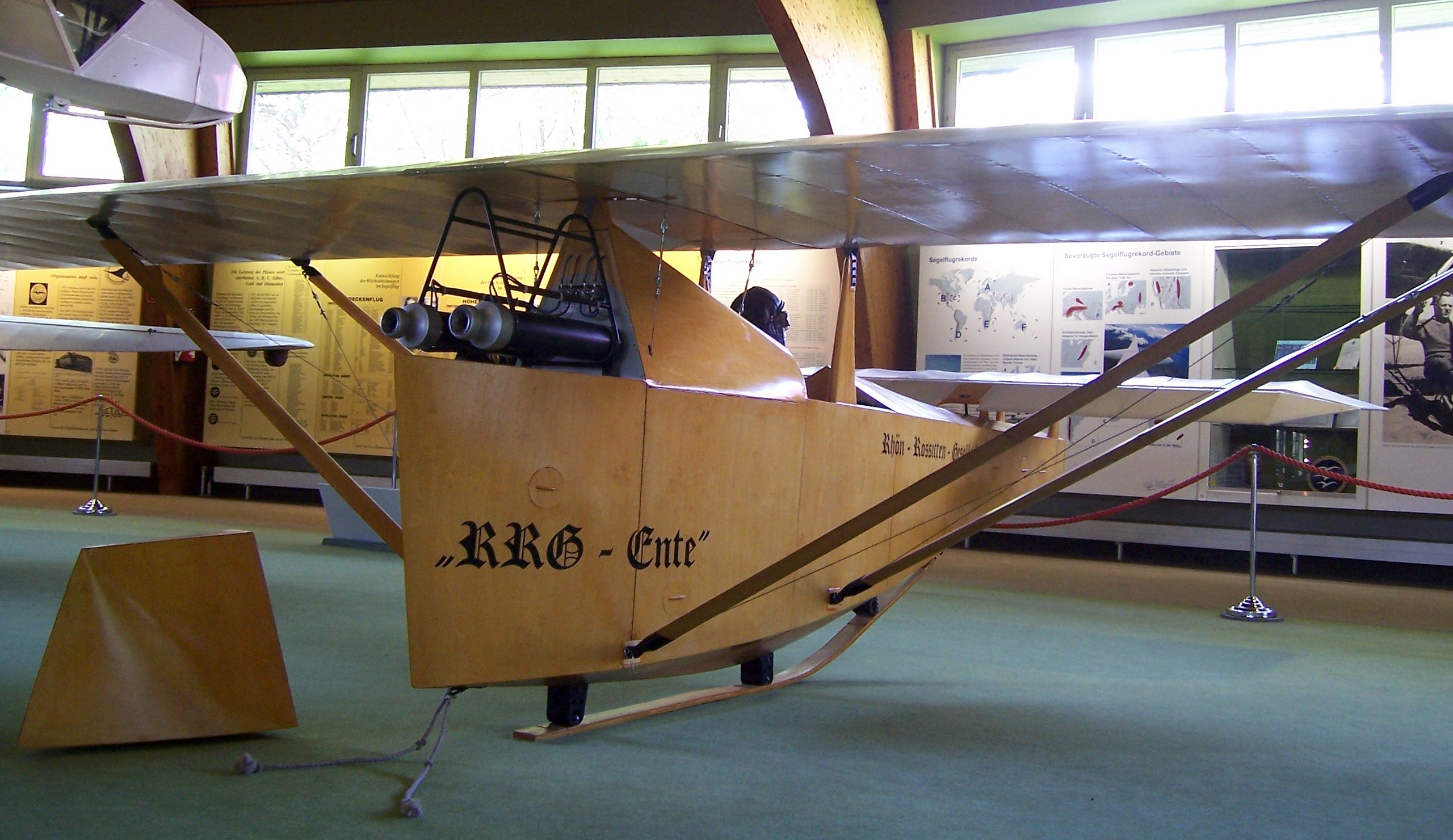
Replica of Opel RAK's Lippisch Ente in Deutsches Segelflugmuseum as the world's first rocket-powered glider

The world's first piloted rocket flights were carried out by the German vehicle manufacturer Opel RAK. The first flight of such an aircraft, a rocket-modified glider designed by Alexander Lippisch, took place at Wasserkuppe Mountain on 11 June 1928. Two black powder rockets, designed by Friedrich Wilhelm Sander, were fitted to the aircraft’s rear. Due to the use of a forward canard arrangement, Lippisch named the glider "Ente", German for duck. After a failed first attempt, one rocket finally ignited as intended and the Ente lifted off, test pilot Fritz Stamer flying it for 1,500 metres (4,900 ft) before making a controlled landing. Another flight using both rockets did not go as planned, as one of the two rockets exploded; the damaged aircraft took off due to the active intact rocket, but the control surfaces did not work, and with much of it aflame Stamer barely survived while fire destroyed the Ente.

After the Ente's loss, Fritz von Opel commissioned a dedicated rocket plane, the Opel RAK.1. It was designed by Julius Hatry, another early Wasserkuppe pioneer, and also equipped with Friedrich Sander's Opel RAK rockets. The first public flight of a rocket plane took place in Frankfurt on 30 September 1929. Lippisch also continued his independent design work over the following decades, and in particular using rocketry, leading eventually to the Me 163.

=== Background ===
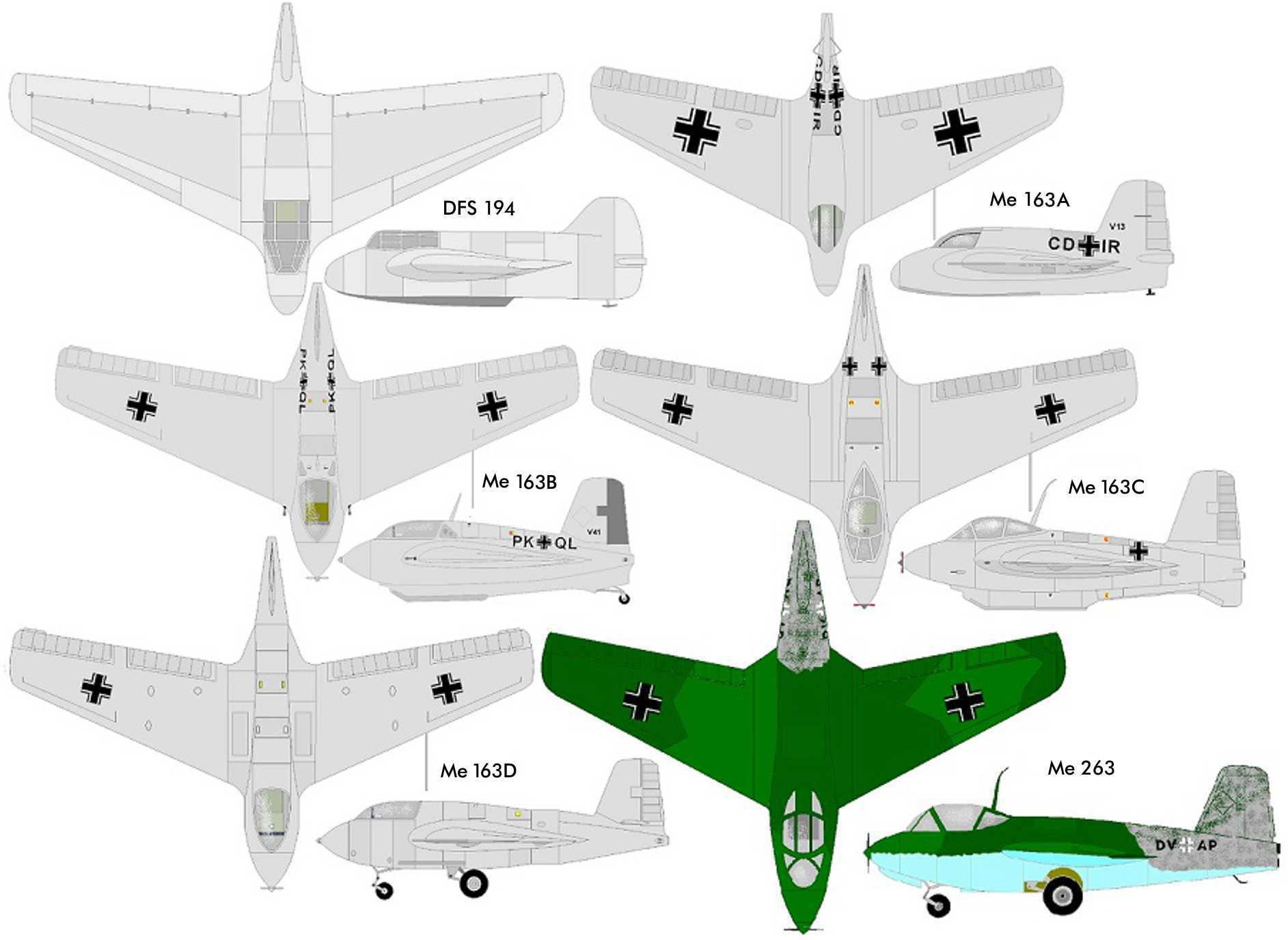
Development of the Me 163

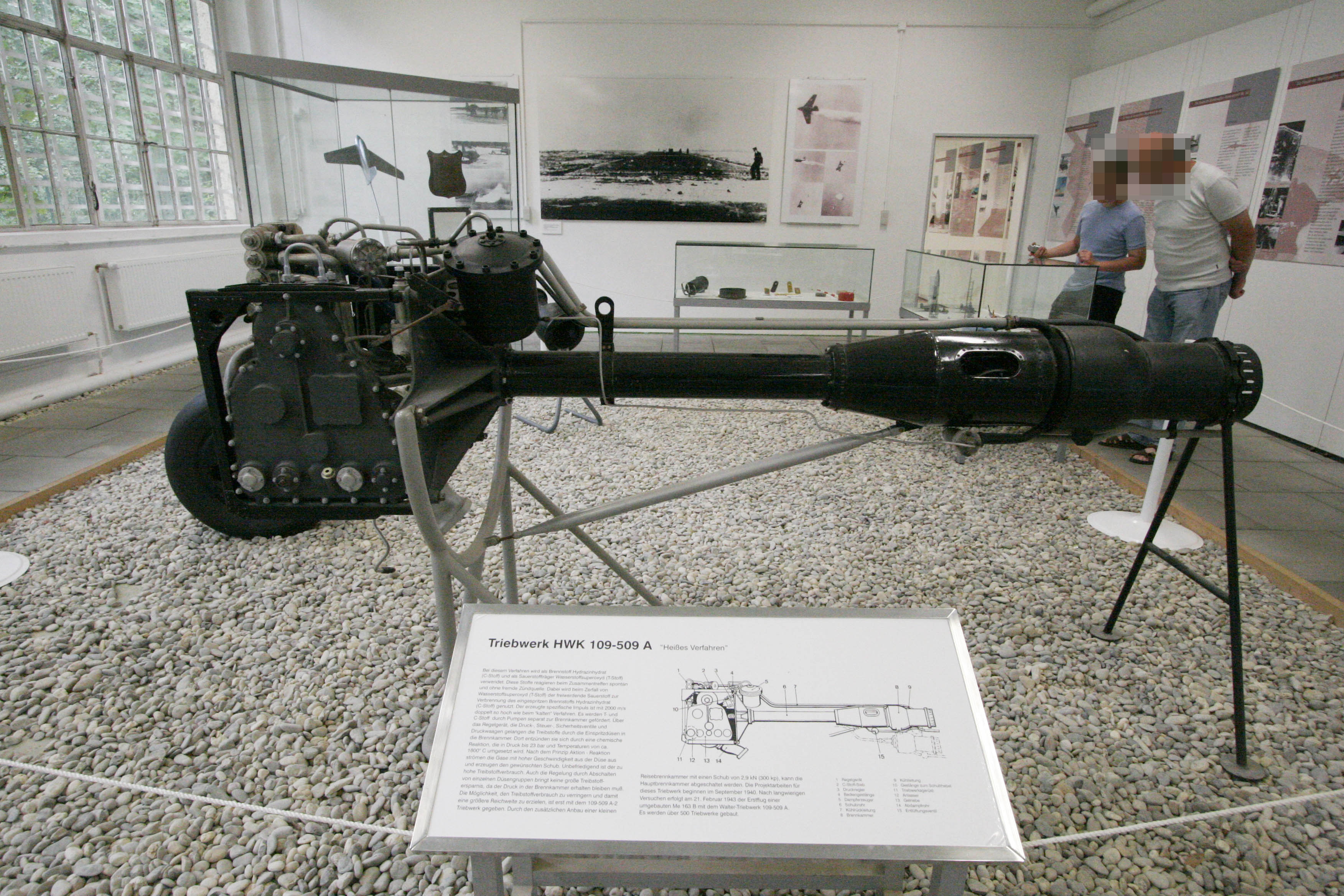
A Me 163's HWK 109-509A engine

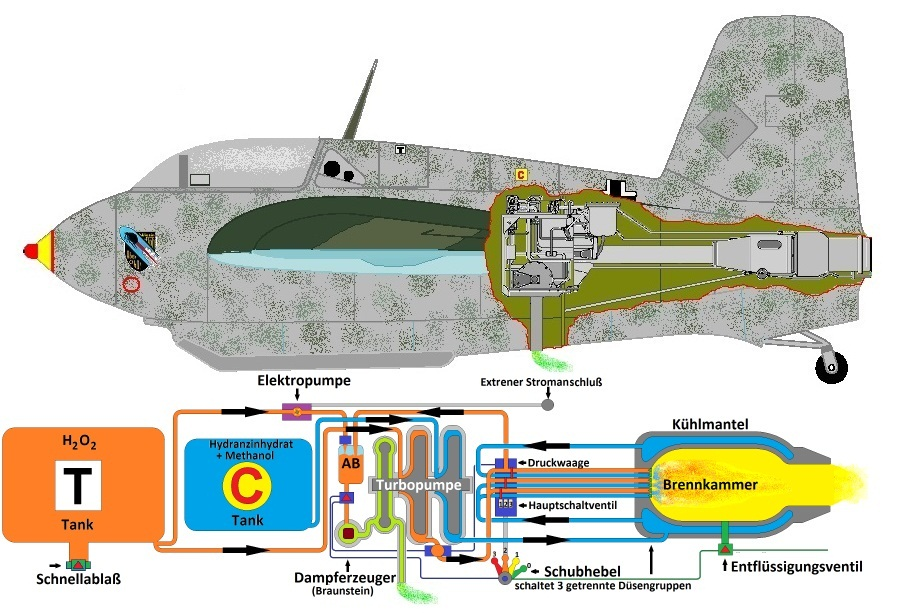
Position of the Walter HWK 109-509A-1 rocket motor

During 1937, work on what would become the Me 163 commenced, the initial work was conducted under the aegis of the Deutsche Forschungsanstalt für Segelflug (DFS)—the German Institute for the study of sailplane flight. Their first design was a conversion of the earlier Lippisch Delta IV known as the DFS 39 and used purely as a glider testbed of the airframe. A larger follow-on version with a small propeller engine started as the DFS 194. This version used wingtip-mounted rudders that Lippisch felt would cause problems at high speed. Lippisch changed the system of vertical stabilization for the DFS 194's airframe from the earlier DFS 39's wingtip rudders, to a conventional vertical stabilizer at the rear of the aircraft. The design included a number of features from its origins as a glider, notably a skid used for landings, which could be retracted into the aircraft's keel in flight. For takeoff, a pair of wheels, each mounted onto the ends of a specially designed cross-axle, were needed due to the weight of the fuel, but the wheels, forming a takeoff dolly under the landing skid, were released shortly after takeoff.

The designers planned to use the forthcoming Walter R-1-203 cold engine of 400 kg (880 lb) thrust, which like the self-contained Walter HWK 109-500 Starthilfe RATO booster rocket unit, used a monopropellant consisting of stabilized HTP known by the name T-Stoff. Heinkel had also been working with Hellmuth Walter on his rocket engines, mounting them in the He 112R's tail for testing – this was done in competition with Wernher von Braun's bi-propellant, alcohol/LOX-fed rocket motors, also with the He 112 as a test airframe – and with the Walter catalyzed HTP propulsion format for the first purpose-designed, liquid-fueled rocket aircraft, the He 176. Heinkel had also been selected to produce the fuselage for the DFS 194 when it entered production, as it was felt that the monopropellant fuel's high reactivity with organic matter would be too dangerous in a wooden fuselage structure. Work continued under the code name Projekt X.

The division of work between DFS and Heinkel led to problems, notably that DFS seemed incapable of building even a prototype fuselage. Lippisch eventually asked to leave DFS and join Messerschmitt instead. (Note: In spite of his transference to Messerschmitt, the relationship between Lippisch and Willy Messerschmitt, the company's head, were allegedly strained, nor did the latter have particular enthusiasm for the Me 163 project.) On 2 January 1939, Lippisch moved with his team and the partly completed DFS 194 to the Messerschmitt works at Augsburg. The delays caused by this move allowed the engine development to catch up. Once at Messerschmitt, the team decided to abandon the propeller-powered version and move directly to rocket-power. The airframe was completed in Augsburg and in early 1940 was shipped to receive its engine at Peenemünde-West, one of the quartet of Erprobungsstelle-designated military aviation test facilities of the Reich. Although the engine proved to be extremely unreliable, the aircraft had excellent performance, reaching a speed of 550 km/h (340 mph) in one test.

The wing sweep incorporated in the design stemmed from its tailless nature and the need to balance centre of gravity and centre of lift positions for stability purposes. The sweep in both the Me 163 and Me 262 stemmed from these CG and CL issues (heavier than planned engines in the case of the Me 262), not from high speed aerodynamic requirements.

In the Me 163B and -C subtypes, a ram-air turbine was installed on the extreme nose of the fuselage that, along with a backup lead–acid battery inside the fuselage that it charged, provided electrical power for various pieces of onboard equipment. Such apparatus included the radio, reflector gunsight (either Revi16B, -C, or -D), direction finder, compass, firing circuits for the twin cannons, as well as some of the lighting for the cockpit instrumentation. Limited battery capacity made the electrical generator necessary.

The airspeed indicator averaged readings from two sources: the pitot tube on the leading edge of the port wing, and a small pitot inlet in the nose, just above the top edge of the underskid channel. There was a further tapping-off of pressure-ducted air from the pitot tube which also provided the rate of climb indicator with its source.

The resistance group around the Austrian priest Heinrich Maier (later executed) had contacts with the Heinkelwerke in Jenbach in Tyrol, where important components for the Me 163 were also produced. The group supplied location sketches of the production facilities to the Allies, thus greatly aiding Allied bombers in carrying out targeted air strikes against them.

=== Me 163A ===
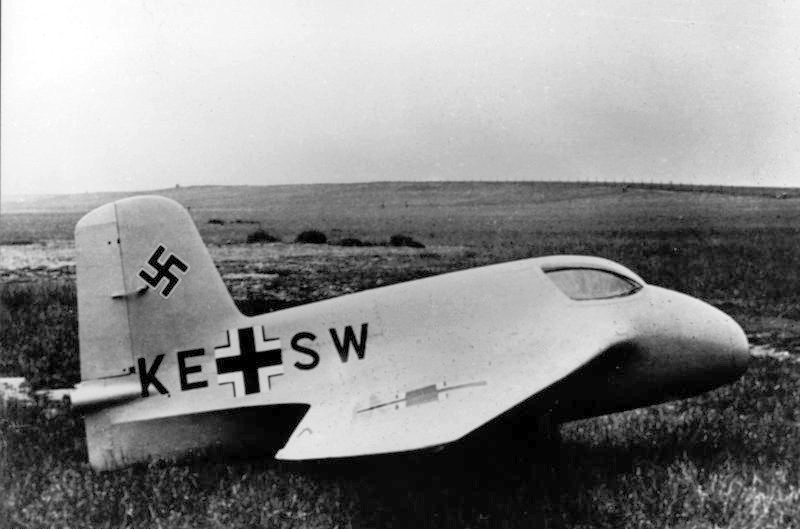
The Me 163A V4 (first prototype) in 1941

In early 1941, production of a prototype series, known as the Me 163, began. Secrecy was such that the RLM's "GL/C" airframe number, 8-163, was actually that of the earlier Messerschmitt Bf 163. Three Bf 163-prototypes (V1 to V3) had been built, and it was thought that foreign intelligence services would conclude any reference to the number "163" was for that earlier design. During May 1941, the first prototype Me 163A, V4, was shipped to Peenemünde to receive the HWK RII-203 engine. By 2 October 1941, Me 163A V4, bearing the radio call sign letters, or Stammkennzeichen, "KE+SW", set a new world speed record of 1,004.5 km/h (624.2 mph), piloted by Heini Dittmar, with no apparent damage to the aircraft during the attempt. Some postwar aviation history publications stated that the Me 163A V3 was thought to have set the record. The 1,004 km/h (542 kn; 624 mph) record figure would not be officially surpassed until after the war, specifically by the American Douglas D-558-1 on 20 August 1947. Ten Me 163As (V4-V13) were built for pilot training and further tests; these were unarmed.

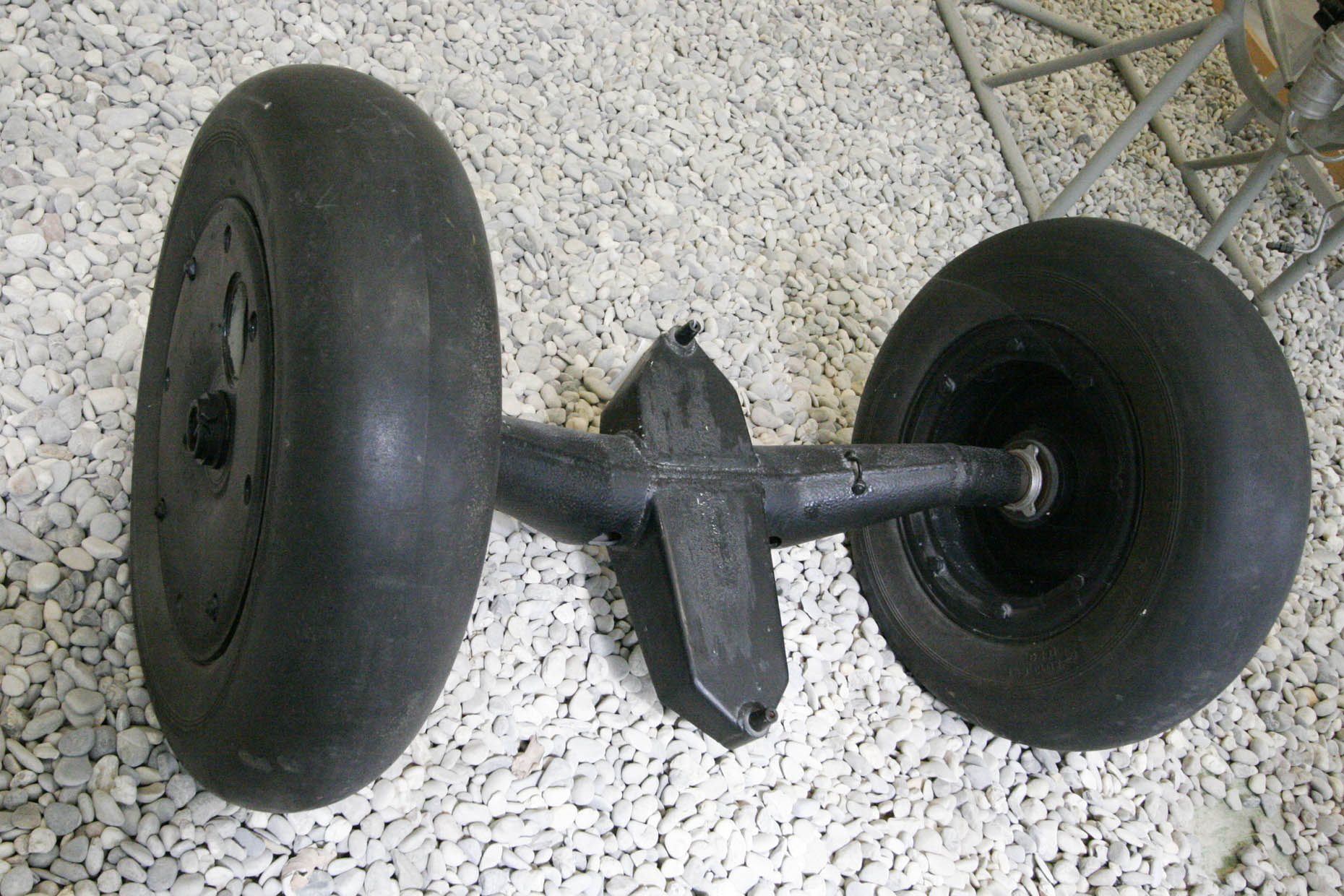
Me 163B's unsprung jettisonable main gear "dolly" unit

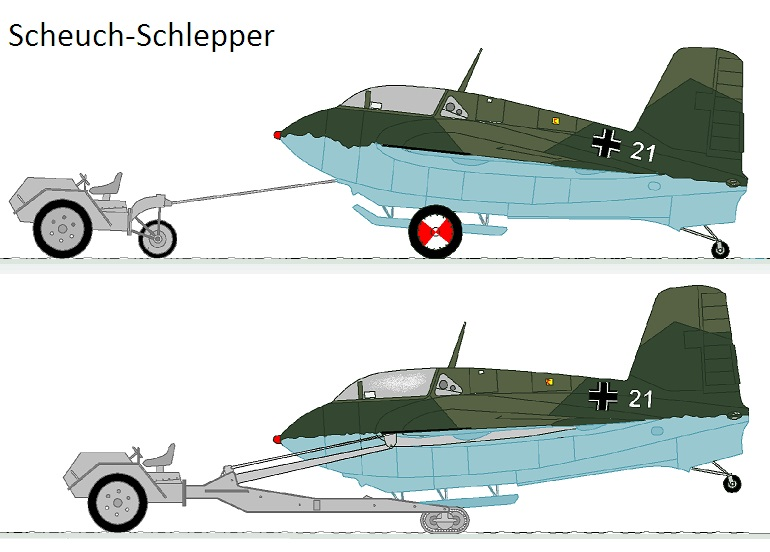
Use of the "Scheuch-Schlepper" before an Me 163B's flight (above) and after (below)

During testing of the prototype (A-series) aircraft, the jettisonable undercarriage presented a serious problem. The original dollies possessed well-sprung independent suspension for each wheel, and as the aircraft took off, the large springs rebounded and threw the dolly upward, striking the aircraft. In comparison, the production (B-series) aircraft used much simpler, crossbeam-axled dollies, and relied on the landing skid's oleo-pneumatic strut to absorb ground-running impacts during the takeoff run, as well as to absorb the shock of landing. If the hydraulic cylinder was malfunctioning, or the skid mistakenly left during a landing procedure in the "locked and lowered" position (as it had to be for takeoff), the impact of a hard touchdown on the skid could cause back injuries to the pilot.

Once on the ground, the aircraft had to be retrieved by a Scheuch-Schlepper, a converted small agricultural vehicle, originally based on the concept of the two-wheel tractor, carrying a detachable third swiveling wheel at the extreme rear of its design for stability in normal use—this swiveling third wheel was replaced with a pivoting, special retrieval trailer that rolled on a pair of short, triple-wheeled continuous track setups (one per side) for military service wherever the Komet was based. This retrieval trailer usually possessed twin trailing lifting arms, that lifted the stationary aircraft off the ground from under each wing whenever it was not already on its twin-wheel dolly main gear, as when the aircraft had landed on its ventral skid and tailwheel after a mission. Another form of trailer, known also to have been trialled with the later B-series examples, was tried during the Komet's test phase, which used a pair of sausage-shaped air bags in place of the lifting arms and could also be towed by the Scheuch-Schlepper tractor, inflating the air bags to lift the aircraft. The three-wheeled Scheuch-Schlepper tractor used for the task was originally meant for farm use, but such a vehicle with a specialized trailer—which could also lift the Me 163's airframe completely clear of the ground to effect the recovery as a normal part of the Me 163's intended use—was required as the Komet was unpowered after exhausting its rocket propellants, and lacked main wheels after landing, from the jettisoning of its "dolly" main gear at takeoff.

During flight testing, the superior gliding capability of the Komet proved detrimental to safe landing. As the now un-powered aircraft completed its final descent, it could rise back into the air with the slightest updraft. Since the approach was unpowered, there was no opportunity to make another landing pass. For production models, a set of landing flaps allowed somewhat more controlled landings. This issue remained a problem throughout the program. Nevertheless, the overall performance was tremendous, and plans were made to put Me 163 squadrons all over Germany in 40-kilometre rings (25 mi) around any potential target. (Note: According to the historian Robert F. Dorr, while Hermann Göring, the head of the Luftwaffe, was a keen proponent of the Me 163, Adolf Hitler was unimpressed by the aircraft, instead favouring the jet-powered Messerschmitt Me 262 amongst other projects.) However, while the development of an operational version was encouraged, the Me 163 programme was not assigned the highest priority due to competition from other projects; this lack of focus protracted its development.

=== Me 163B ===
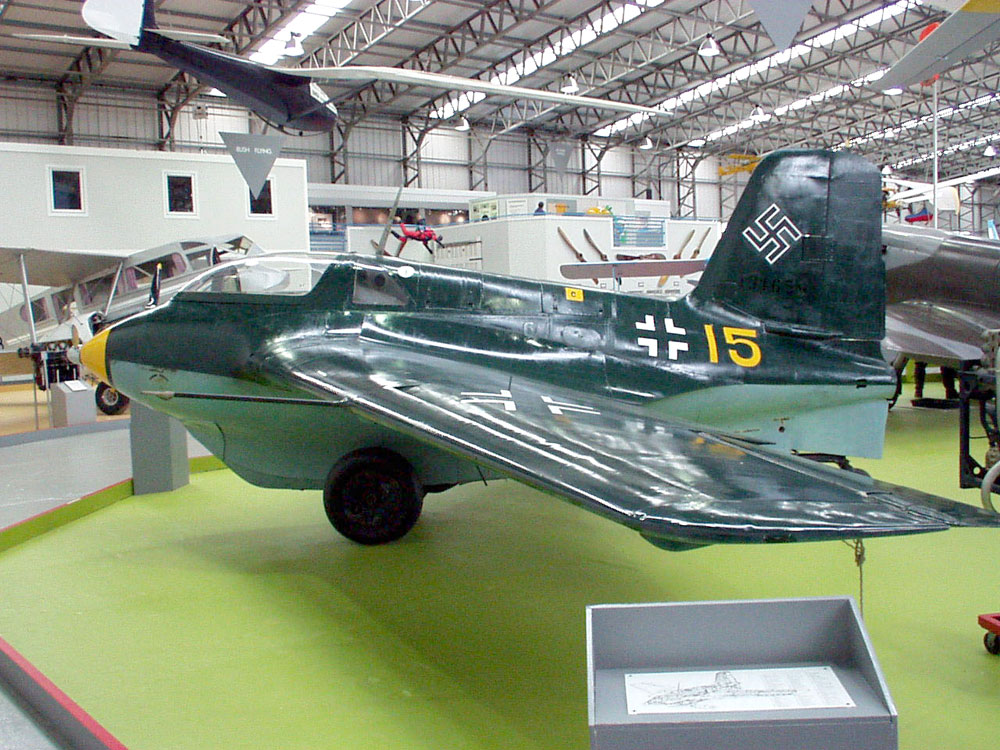
Me 163 B-1a at the National Museum of Flight in East Fortune, Scotland

In December 1941, work on an upgraded design began. A simplified construction format for the airframe was deemed necessary, as the Me 163A version was not truly optimized for large-scale production. The result was the Me 163B subtype that had the desired, more mass-producible fuselage, wing panel, retractable landing skid and tailwheel designs with the previously mentioned unsprung dolly takeoff gear, and a generally one-piece conical nose for the forward fuselage which could incorporate a turbine for supplementary electrical power while in flight, as well as a one-piece, perimeter frame-only hinged canopy for ease of production.

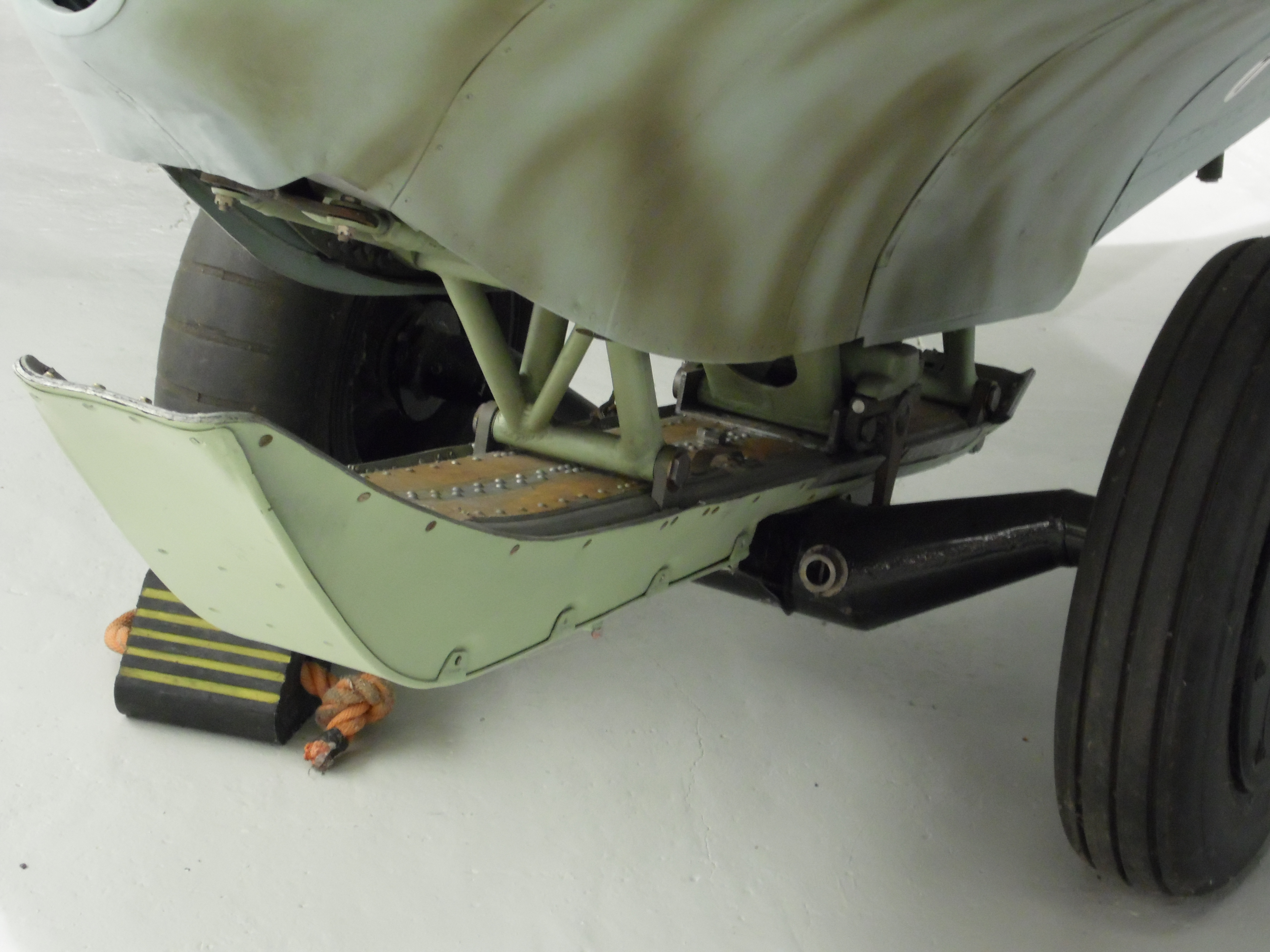
Landing skid of a Messerschmitt Me 163B shown extended for takeoff, with the take-off dolly attached.

Meanwhile, Walter had started work on the newer HWK 109-509 bipropellant hot engine, which added a fuel of hydrazine hydrate and methanol, designated C-Stoff, that burned with the oxygen-rich exhaust from the T-Stoff, used as the oxidizer, for added thrust. The new powerplant and numerous detail design changes meant to simplify production over the general A-series airframe design resulted in the significantly modified Me 163B of late 1941. Due to the Reichsluftfahrtministerium requirement that it should be possible to throttle the engine, the original power plant grew complicated and lost reliability. The Komet carried no more than 437 US gallons (1,650 L) of fuel, which was exhausted in 4 to 7 minutes, limiting its flight radius to 25 miles (40 km).

The fuel system was particularly troublesome, as leaks incurred during hard landings easily caused fires and explosions. Metal fuel lines and fittings, which failed in unpredictable ways, were used as this was the best technology available. Both fuel and oxidizer were toxic and required extreme care when loading in the aircraft, yet there were occasions when Komets exploded on the tarmac from the propellants' hypergolic nature. Both propellants were clear fluids, and different tanker trucks were used for delivering each propellant to a particular Komet aircraft, usually the C-Stoff hydrazine/methanol-base fuel first. For safety purposes, the truck left the immediate area of the aircraft following its delivery and capping off of the Komet's fuel tanks from a rear located dorsal fuselage filling point just ahead of the Komet's vertical stabilizer. Then, the other tanker truck carrying the very reactive T-Stoff hydrogen peroxide oxidizer would deliver its load through a different filling point on the Komet's dorsal fuselage surface, located not far behind the rear edge of the canopy.

The corrosive nature of the liquids, especially for the T-Stoff oxidizer, required special protective gear for the pilots. To help prevent explosions, the engine and the propellant storage and delivery systems were frequently and thoroughly hosed down and flushed with water run through the propellant tanks and the rocket engine's propellant systems before and after flights, to clean out any remnants. The relative "closeness" to the pilot of some 120 litres (31.7 US gal) of the chemically active T-Stoff oxidizer, split between two auxiliary oxidizer tanks of equal volume to either side within the lower flanks of the cockpit area—besides the main oxidizer tank of some 1,040-litre (275 US gal) volume just behind the cockpit's rear wall, could present a serious or even fatal hazard to a pilot in a fuel-caused mishap.

Two prototypes were followed by 30 Me 163 B-0 pre-production aircraft armed with two 20 mm MG 151/20 cannon and some 400 Me 163 B-1 production aircraft armed with two 30 mm (1.18-inch) MK 108 cannons, but which were otherwise similar to the B-0. Early in the war, when German aircraft firms created versions of their aircraft for export purposes, the a was added to export (ausland) variants (B-1a) or to foreign-built variants (Ba-1) but for the Me 163, there were neither export nor a foreign-built version. Later in the war, the "a" and successive letters were used for aircraft using different engine types: as Me 262 A-1a with Jumo engines, Me 262 A-1b with BMW engines. As the Me 163 was planned with an alternative BMW P3330A rocket engine, it is likely the "a" was used for this purpose on early examples. Only one Me 163, the V10, was tested with the BMW engine, so this designation suffix was soon dropped. The Me 163 B-1a did not have any wingtip "washout" built into it, and as a result, it had a much higher critical Mach number than the Me 163 B-1.

The Me 163B had very docile landing characteristics, mostly due to its integrated leading edge slots, located directly forward of the elevon control surfaces, and just behind and at the same angle as the wing's leading edge. It would neither stall nor spin. One could fly the Komet with the stick full back, and have it in a turn and then use the rudder to take it out of the turn, and not fear it snapping into a spin. It would also slip well. Because the Me 163B's airframe design was derived from glider design concepts, it had excellent gliding qualities, and the tendency to continue flying above the ground due to ground effect. On the other hand, making a too close turn from base onto final, the sink rate would increase, and one could quickly lose altitude and come in short. Another main difference from a propeller-driven aircraft is that there was no slipstream over the rudder. On takeoff, one had to attain the speed at which the aerodynamic controls become effective—about 129 km/h (80 mph)—and that was always a critical factor. Pilots accustomed to flying propeller-driven aircraft had to be careful that the control stick was not somewhere in the corner when the control surfaces began working. These, like many other specific Me 163 problems, would be resolved by specific training.

The performance of the Me 163 far exceeded that of contemporary piston engine fighters. At a speed of over 320 km/h (200 mph) the aircraft would take off, in a so-called "scharfer Start" ("hot start") from the ground, from its two-wheeled dolly. The aircraft would be kept at level flight at low altitude until the best climbing speed of around 676 km/h (420 mph) was reached, at which point it would jettison the dolly, retract its extendable skid using a knob-topped release lever just forward of the throttle (as both levers were located atop the cockpit's portside 120-litre T-Stoff oxidizer tank) that engaged the aforementioned pneumatic cylinder, and then pull up into a 70° angle of climb, to a bomber's altitude. It could go higher if required, reaching 12,000 m (39,000 ft) in an unheard-of three minutes. Once there, it would level off and quickly accelerate to around 880 km/h (550 mph) or faster, which no Allied fighter could match. The usable Mach number was similar to that of the Me 262, but because of the high thrust-to-drag ratio, it was much easier for the pilot to lose track of the onset of severe compressibility and risk loss of control. A Mach warning system was installed as a result. The aircraft was remarkably agile and docile to fly at high speed. According to Rudolf Opitz, chief test pilot of the Me 163, it could "fly circles around any other fighter of its time".

By this point, Messerschmitt was completely overloaded with production of the Messerschmitt Bf 109 and attempts to bring the Me 210 into service. Production in a dispersed network was handed over to Klemm, but quality control problems were such that the work was later given to Junkers, who were, at that time, underworked. As with many German designs of World War II's later years, parts of the airframe (especially the wings) were made of wood by furniture manufacturers. The older Me 163A and first Me 163B prototypes were used for training. It was planned to introduce the Me 163S, which removed the rocket engine and tank capacity and placed a second seat for the instructor above and behind the pilot, with his own canopy. The Me 163S would be used for glider landing training, which as explained above, was essential to operate the Me 163. It appears that the Me 163S was produced via the conversion of the earlier Me 163B series prototypes.

In service, the Me 163 turned out to be difficult to use against enemy aircraft. Its tremendous speed and climb rate meant a target was reached and passed in a matter of seconds. Although the Me 163 was a stable gun platform, it required excellent marksmanship to bring down an enemy bomber. The Komet was equipped with two 30 mm (1.18 inch) MK 108 cannons that had a relatively low muzzle velocity of 540 meters per second (1,772 feet/sec), and were accurate only at short range, making it almost impossible to hit a slow moving bomber. Four or five hits were typically needed to take down a B-17.

Innovative methods were employed to help pilots achieve kills. The most promising was a weapon called the Sondergerät 500 Jägerfaust. This included 10 single-shot, short-barreled 50 mm (2-inch) guns pointing upwards, similar to Schräge Musik. Five were mounted in the wing roots on each side of the aircraft. A photocell in the upper surface of the Komet triggered the weapons by detecting the change in brightness when the aircraft flew under a bomber. As each shell shot upwards, the disposable gun barrel that fired it was ejected downwards, thus making the weapon recoilless. It appears that this weapon was used in combat only once, resulting in the destruction of a Lancaster bomber on 10 April 1945.

=== Later versions ===
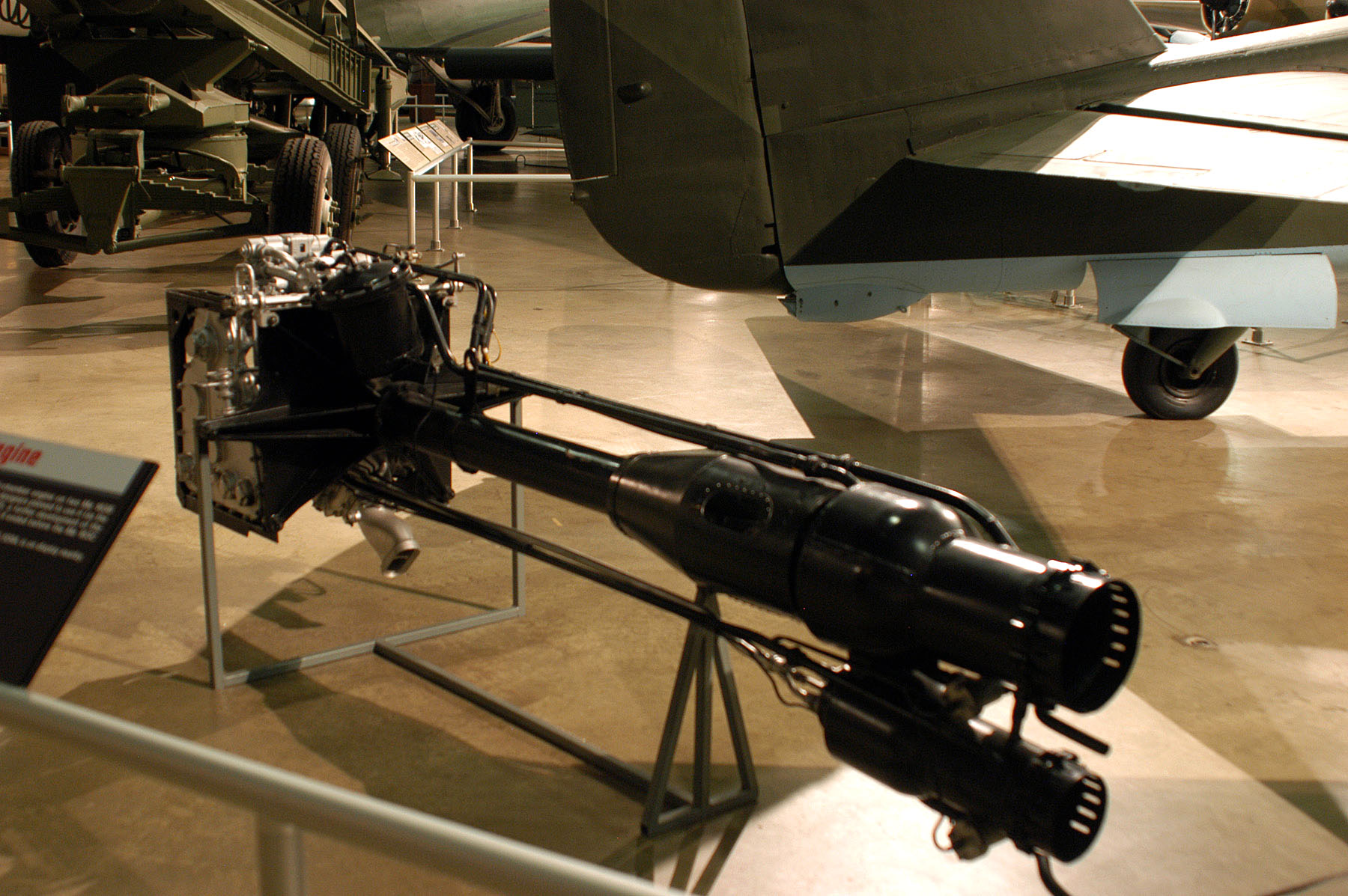
A preserved HWK 109-509B "cruiser" twin-chamber rocket motor (National Museum of the United States Air Force)

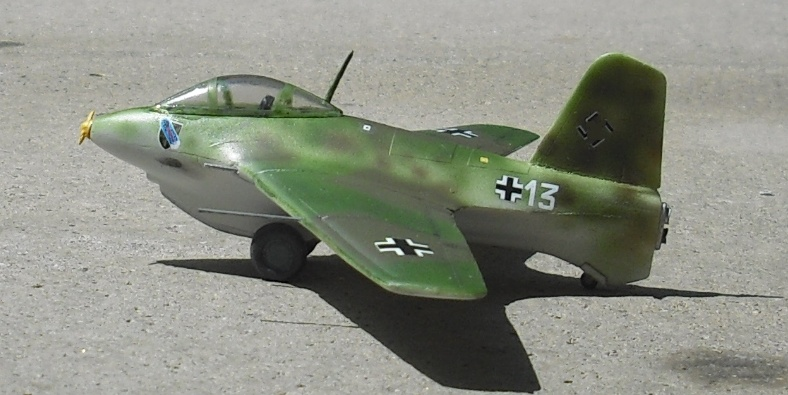
Model of the Me 163C

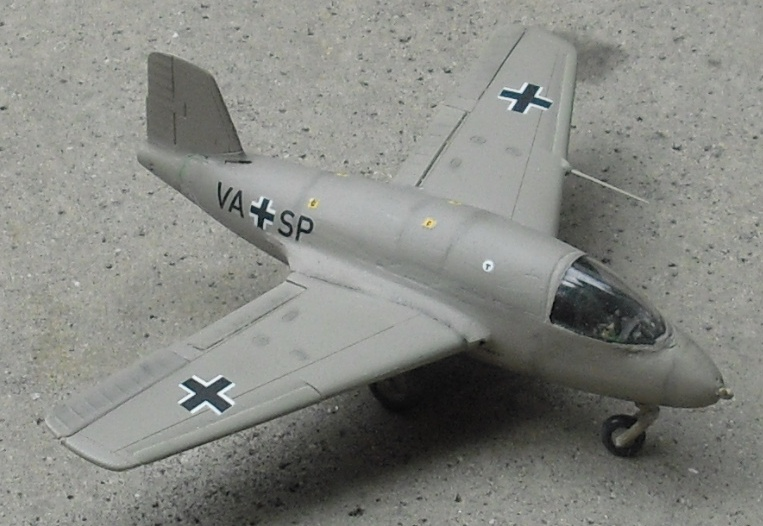
Model of the unbuilt Me 163D, erroneously marked with the Me 163B V18's markings for this airframe design

The biggest concern about the design was the short flight time, which never met the projections made by Walter. Being capable of a maximum of 7.5 minutes of powered flight (which was only roughly 25% of the 30-minute combat time that the "light-class" Heinkel He 162A Spatz single-BMW 003 jet fighter possessed), when the Komet entered combat in April 1945; the solely rocket-powered Me 163B fighter truly was a dedicated point defense interceptor. To improve this, the Walter firm began developing two more advanced versions of the 509A rocket engine, the 509B and C, each with two separate combustion chambers of differing sizes, one above the other, for greater efficiency. The B-version possessed a main combustion chamber—usually termed in German as a Hauptofen on these dual-chamber subtypes—with an exterior shape much like that on the single chamber 509A version, with the C-version having a forward chamber shape of a more cylindrical nature, designed for a higher top thrust level of some 2,000 kg (4,410 lb) of thrust, while simultaneously dropping the use of the cubic-shape frame for the forward engine propellant flow/turbopump mechanisms as used by the earlier -A and -B versions. The 509B and 509C rocket motors' main combustion chambers were supported by the thrust tube exactly as the 509A motor's single chamber had been. They were tuned for high power for takeoff and climb. The added, smaller volume lower chamber on the two later models, nicknamed the Marschofen with approximately 400 kg (880 lb) of thrust at its top performance level, was intended for more efficient, lower power cruise flight. These HWK 109–509B and C motors would improve endurance by as much as 50%. Two 163 Bs, models V6 and V18, were experimentally fitted with the lower-thrust B-version of the new twin-chamber engine (mandating twin combustion chamber pressure gauges on the instrument panel of any Komet equipped with them), a retractable tailwheel, and tested in spring 1944.

The main Hauptofen combustion chamber of the 509B engine used for the B V6 and V18 occupied the same location as the A-series' engine did, with the lower Marschofen cruise chamber housed within the retractable tailwheel's appropriately widened ventral tail fairing. On 6 July 1944, the Me 163B V18 (VA+SP), like the B V6 basically a standard production Me 163B airframe outfitted with the new, twin-chamber "cruiser" rocket motor with the aforementioned airframe modifications beneath the original rocket motor orifice to accept the extra combustion chamber, set a new unofficial world speed record of 1,130 km/h (702 mph), piloted by Heini Dittmar, and landed with almost all of the vertical rudder surface broken away from flutter. This record was not broken in terms of absolute speed until 6 November 1947 by Chuck Yeager in flight number 58 that was part of the Bell X-1 test program, with a 1,434 km/h (891 mph), or Mach 1.35 supersonic speed, recorded at an altitude of nearly 14,820 m (48,620 ft). (Note: List of X-1 flights) However, it is unclear if Dittmar's flight achieved sufficient altitude for its speed to be considered supersonic, as the X-1 did.

The X-1 never exceeded Dittmar's speed from a normal runway "scharfer Start" liftoff. Heini Dittmar had reached the 1,130 km/h (702 mph) performance, after a normal "hot start" ground takeoff, without an air drop from a mother ship. Neville Duke exceeded Heini Dittmar's record mark roughly 5 1/2 years after Yeager's achievement (and some 263 km/h short of it) on 31 August 1953 with the Hawker Hunter F Mk3 at a speed of 1,171 km/h (728 mph), after a normal ground start. (Note: Test Pilot Neville Duke set a world record on 7 September 1953.) Postwar experimental aircraft of the aerodynamic configuration that the Me 163 used, were found to have serious stability problems when entering transonic flight, like the similarly configured, and turbojet powered, Northrop X-4 Bantam and de Havilland DH 108, which made the V18's record with the Walter 509B "cruiser" rocket motor more remarkable.

Waldemar Voigt of Messerschmitt's Oberammergau project and development offices started a redesign of the 163 to incorporate the new twin-chamber Walter rocket engine, as well as fix other problems. The resulting Me 163C design featured a larger wing through the addition of an insert at the wing root, an extended fuselage with extra tank capacity through the addition of a plug insert behind the wing, a ventral fairing whose aft section possessed a retractable tailwheel design closely resembling that pioneered on the Me 163B V6, and a new pressurized cockpit topped with a bubble canopy for improved visibility, on a fuselage that had dispensed with the earlier B-version's dorsal fairing. The additional tank capacity and cockpit pressurization allowed the maximum altitude to increase to 15,850 m (52,000 ft), as well as improving powered time to about 12 minutes, almost doubling combat time (from about five minutes to nine). Three Me 163 C-1a prototypes were planned, but it appears only one was flown, but without its intended engine.

By this time the project was moved to Junkers. There, a new design effort under the direction of Heinrich Hertel at Dessau attempted to improve the Komet. The Hertel team had to compete with the Lippisch team and their Me 163C. Hertel investigated the Me 163 and found it was not well suited for mass production and not optimized as a fighter aircraft, with the most glaring deficiency being the lack of retractable landing gear. To accommodate this, what would eventually become the Me 263 V1 prototype would be fitted with the desired tricycle gear, also accommodating the twin-chamber Walter rocket from the start—later it was assigned to the Ju 248 program.

The resulting Junkers Ju 248 used a three-section fuselage to ease construction. The V1 prototype was completed for testing in August 1944, and was glider-tested behind a Junkers Ju 188. Some sources state that the Walter 109–509C engine was fitted in September, but it was probably never tested under power. At this point the RLM reassigned the project to Messerschmitt, where it became the Messerschmitt Me 263. This appears to have been a formality only, with Junkers continuing the work and planning production. By the time the design was ready to go into production, the plant where it was to be built was overrun by Soviet forces. While it did not reach operational status, the work was briefly continued by the Soviet Mikoyan-Gurevich (MiG) design bureau as the Mikoyan-Gurevich I-270.

== Operational history ==
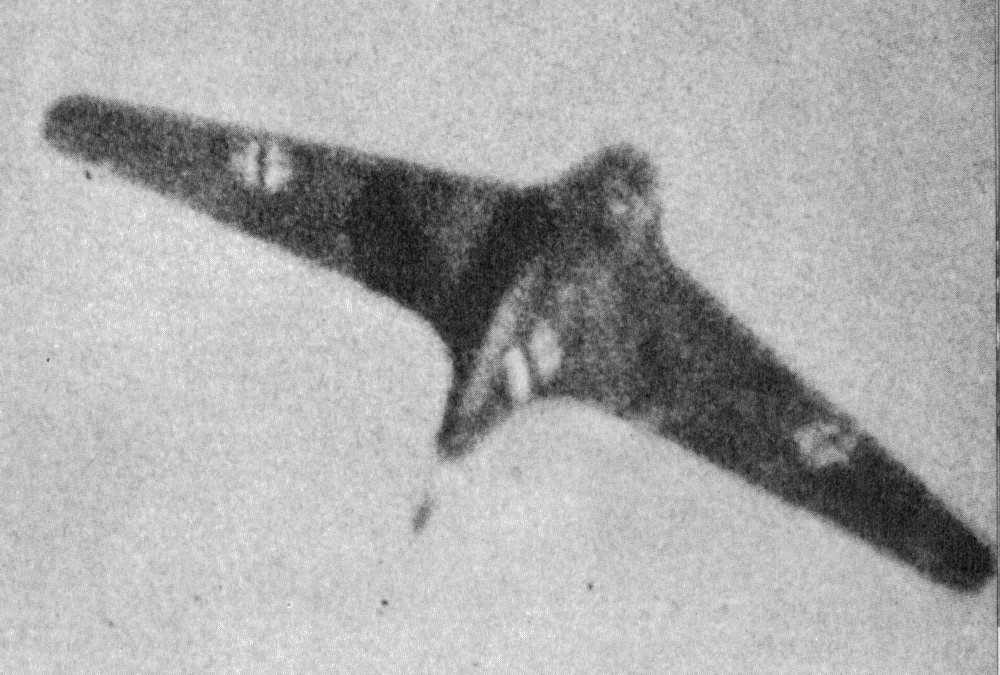
A Me 163 being shot down, as seen from USAAF P-47 gun camera

The initial test deployment of the Me 163A, to acquaint prospective pilots with the world's first rocket-powered fighter, occurred with Erprobungskommando 16 (Service Test Unit 16, EK 16), led by Major Wolfgang Späte and first established in late 1942, receiving their eight A-model service test aircraft by July 1943. Their initial base was as the Erprobungsstelle (test facility) at the Peenemünde-West field. They departed permanently the day after an RAF bombing raid on the area on 17 August 1943, moving southwards, to the base at Anklam, near the Baltic coast. Their stay was brief, as a few weeks later they were placed in northwest Germany, based at the military airfield at Bad Zwischenahn from August 1943 to August 1944. EK 16 received their first B-series armed Komets in January 1944, and was ready for action by May while at Bad Zwischenahn. Major Späte flew the first-ever Me 163B combat sortie on 13 May 1944 from the Bad Zwischenahn base, with the Me 163B armed prototype (V41), bearing the Stammkennzeichen PK+QL.

During early 1944, routine aerial reconnaissance flights over German aerodromes had made the Allies aware of the existence of the Me 163, but as EK 16 commenced small-scale combat operations in May 1944, the Me 163B's unsurpassed velocity was something Allied fighter pilots were at a loss to counter. The Komets attacked singly or in pairs, often even faster than the intercepting fighters could dive. A typical Me 163 tactic was to fly vertically upward through the bombers at 9,000 m (30,000 ft), climb to 10,700–12,000 m (35,100–39,400 ft), then dive through the formation again, firing as they went. This approach afforded the pilot two brief chances to fire a few rounds from his cannons before gliding back to his airfield. The pilots reported it was possible to make four passes on a bomber, but only if it was flying alone. According to the historian Mano Ziegler, German officials were allegedly considering using the Me 163 to directly ram into enemy aircraft in suicide attacks; this desperate tactic was never actually used.

Prospective Me163 pilots received training in Stummelhabicht gliders which, like the Komet, had a short wingspan and high landing speed. Training included gunnery practice with a machine pistol mounted in the glider nose. As the cockpit was unpressurized, the operational ceiling was limited by what the pilot could endure for several minutes while breathing oxygen from a mask, without losing consciousness. Pilots underwent altitude chamber training to harden them against the rigors of operating in the thin air of the troposphere without a pressure suit. Special low fiber diets were prepared for pilots, as gas in the gastrointestinal tract would expand rapidly during ascent.

Following the initial combat trial missions of the Me 163B with EK 16, during the winter and spring of 1944 Major Späte formed the Luftwaffe's first dedicated Me 163 fighter wing, Jagdgeschwader 400 (JG 400), in Brandis, near Leipzig. JG 400's purpose was to provide additional protection for the Leuna synthetic gasoline works which were raided frequently during almost all of 1944. A further group was stationed at Stargard near Stettin to protect the large synthetic fuel plant at Pölitz (today Police, Poland). Further defensive units of rocket fighters were planned for Berlin, the Ruhr, and the German Bight.

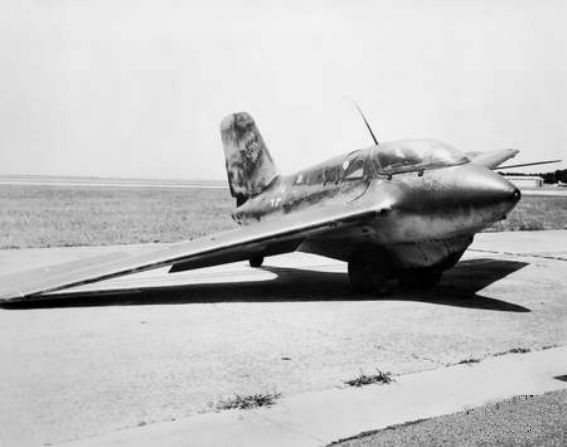
Typical appearance of a Komet after landing, waiting for the airfield's Scheuch-Schlepper tractor and lifting trailer to tow it back for reattachment of its "dolly" maingear

The first actions involving the Me 163B in regular Luftwaffe active service occurred on 28 July 1944, from I./JG 400's base at Brandis, when two USAAF B-17 Flying Fortress were attacked without confirmed kills. Combat operations continued from May 1944 to spring 1945. During this time, there were nine confirmed kills with ten Me 163s lost. Feldwebel Siegfried Schubert was the most successful pilot, with three bombers to his credit. Each engagement would see as many as a dozen Me 163s at a time launched to challenge the B-17s.

Allied fighter pilots quickly observed the short duration of the Me 163's powered flight, and adapted their tactics to take advantage of this. The fighters would delay engaging until after the engine had exhausted its propellant before pouncing on the unpowered Komet. Even with this handicap, the aircraft was extremely manoeuvrable in gliding flight and thus was not a straightforward target to down. Another Allied method of engagement was to attack the airfields from which the Komets operated, performing strafing runs upon them after the Me 163s had landed. Due to the skid-based landing gear system, the Komet was immobile until the Scheuch-Schlepper tractor could back the trailer up to the nose of the aircraft, place its two rear arms under the wing panels, and jack up the trailer's arms to hoist the aircraft off the ground or place it back on its take-off dolly to tow it back to its maintenance area.

At the end of 1944, 91 aircraft had been delivered to JG 400, but a persistent lack of fuel had kept most of them grounded. It was clear that the original plan for a huge network of Me 163 bases would never be realized. Up to that point, JG 400 had lost only six aircraft due to enemy action. Nine Me 163s had been lost to other causes, remarkably few for such a revolutionary and technologically advanced aircraft. Into early 1945, the type continued to be flown to defend high priority targets, such as the Daimler Benz tank factory in Berlin. In the final days of Nazi Germany, the Me 163 was given up in favor of the more successful Me 262. At the beginning of May 1945, Me 163 operations were stopped, the JG 400 disbanded, and many of its pilots sent to fly Me 262s.

In any operational sense, the Komet was a failure. Although it shot down sixteen aircraft, mainly four-engined bombers, it did not warrant the effort put into the project. Due to fuel shortages late in the war, few went into combat, and it took an experienced pilot with excellent shooting skills to achieve kills. The Komet also inspired later rocket planes such as the vertical-launch Bachem Ba 349 Natter. Ultimately, the point defense role that the Me 163 played would be taken over by the surface-to-air missile, Messerschmitt's own example being the Enzian.

=== Postwar flight ===
Captain Eric Brown RN, Chief Naval Test Pilot and commanding officer of the Captured Enemy Aircraft Flight, who tested the Me 163 at the Royal Aircraft Establishment at Farnborough, said, "The Me 163 was an aeroplane that you could not afford to just step into the aircraft and say 'You know, I'm going to fly it to the limit.' You had very much to familiarise yourself with it because it was state-of-the-art and the technology used." Acting unofficially, after a spate of accidents involving Allied personnel flying captured German aircraft resulted in official disapproval of such flights, Brown was determined to fly a powered Komet. On around 17 May 1945, he flew an Me 163B at Husum with the help of a cooperative German ground crew, after initial towed flights in an Me 163A to familiarise himself with the handling.

The day before the flight, Brown and his ground crew had performed an engine run on the chosen Me 163B to ensure that everything was running correctly, the German crew being apprehensive should an accident befall Brown, until being given a disclaimer signed by him to the effect that they were acting under his orders. On the rocket-powered "scharfer-start" takeoff the next day, after dropping the takeoff dolly and retracting the skid, Brown later described the resultant climb as "like being in charge of a runaway train", the aircraft reaching 32,000 feet (9,800 m) altitude in 2 minutes, 45 seconds. During the flight, while practicing attacking passes at an American B-17 bomber, he was surprised at how well the Komet accelerated in the dive with the engine shut down. When the flight was over Brown had no problems on the approach to the airfield; apart from the rather restricted view from the cockpit due to the flat angle of glide, the aircraft touching down at 200 km/h (120 mph). Once down safely, Brown and his much-relieved ground crew celebrated with a drink.

Beyond Brown's unauthorised flight, the British never tested the Me 163 under power themselves; due to the danger of its hypergolic propellants it was only flown unpowered. Brown himself piloted RAE's Komet VF241 on a number of occasions, the rocket motor being replaced with test instrumentation. When interviewed for a 1990s television programme, Brown said he had flown five tailless aircraft in his career (including the British de Havilland DH 108). Referring to the Komet, he said "this is the only one that had good flight characteristics"; he called the other four "killers".

== Surviving aircraft ==
It has been claimed that at least 29 Komets were shipped out of Germany after the war and that of those at least 10 have been known to survive the war to be put on display in museums around the world. Most of the 10 surviving Me 163s were part of JG 400, and were captured by the British at Husum, the squadron's base at the time of Germany's surrender in 1945. According to the RAF museum, 48 aircraft were captured intact and 24 were shipped to the United Kingdom for evaluation, although only one, VF241, was test flown (unpowered).

=== Australia ===
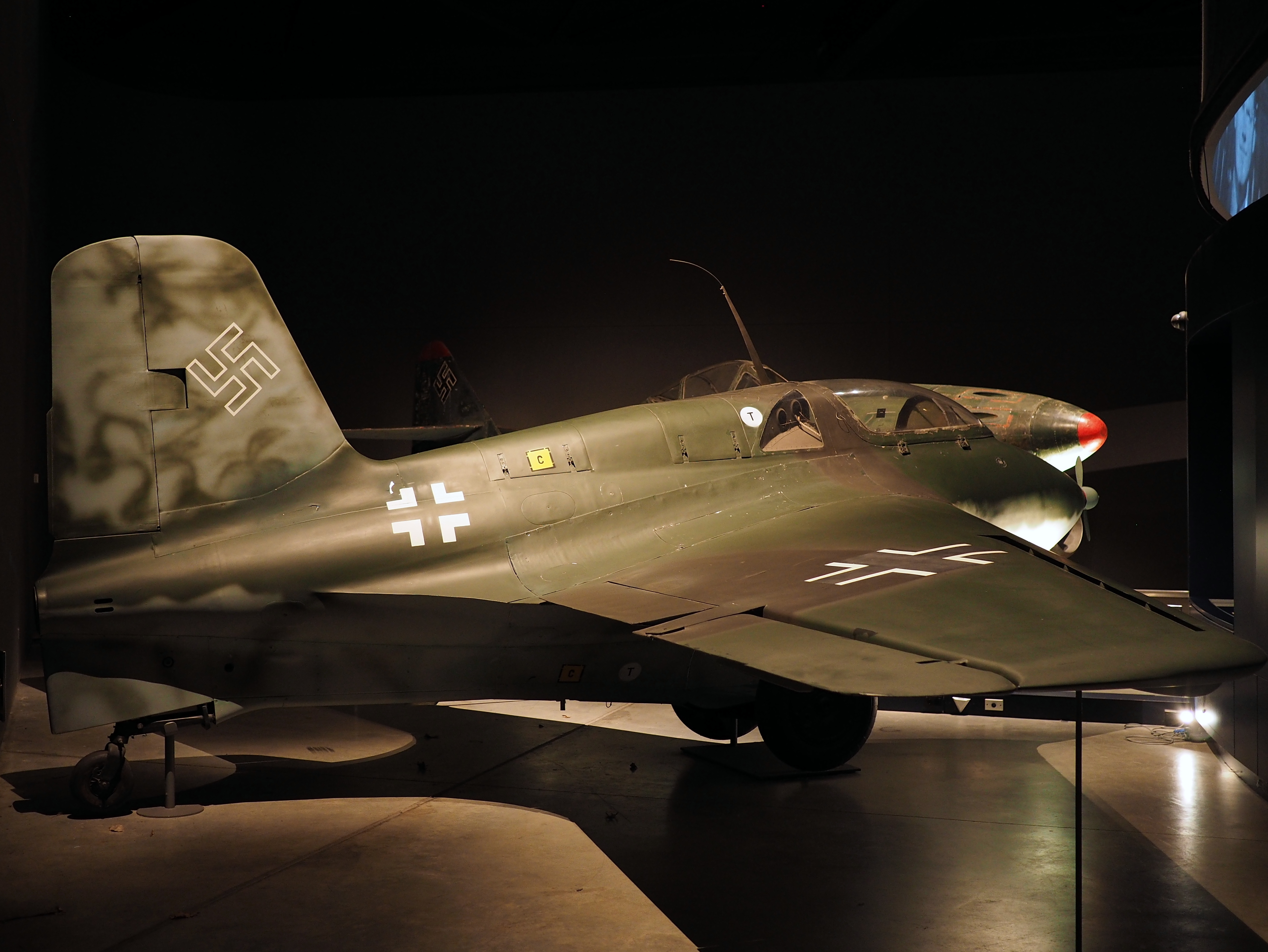
Me 163B, Werknummer 191907, is part of the collection of the Australian War Memorial in Canberra

- Me 163B, Werknummer 191907 was part of JG 400, captured at Husum and was shipped to the RAE. It was allocated the RAF Air Ministry number of AM222 and was dispatched from Farnborough to No. 6 MU, RAF Brize Norton, on 8 August 1945. On 21 March 1946, it was recorded in the Census of No. 6 MU, and allocated to No. 76 MU (Wroughton) on 30 April 1946 for shipment to Australia. For many years this aircraft was displayed at RAAF Williams Point Cook, but in 1986, the Me 163 was transferred to The Australian War Memorial for refurbishment. It was stored at the AWM Treloar Technology Annex Mitchell, refurbished and reassembled, and was later put up for display together with a Messerschmitt Me 262A-2a, Werknummer 500200 (AM81).

=== Canada ===
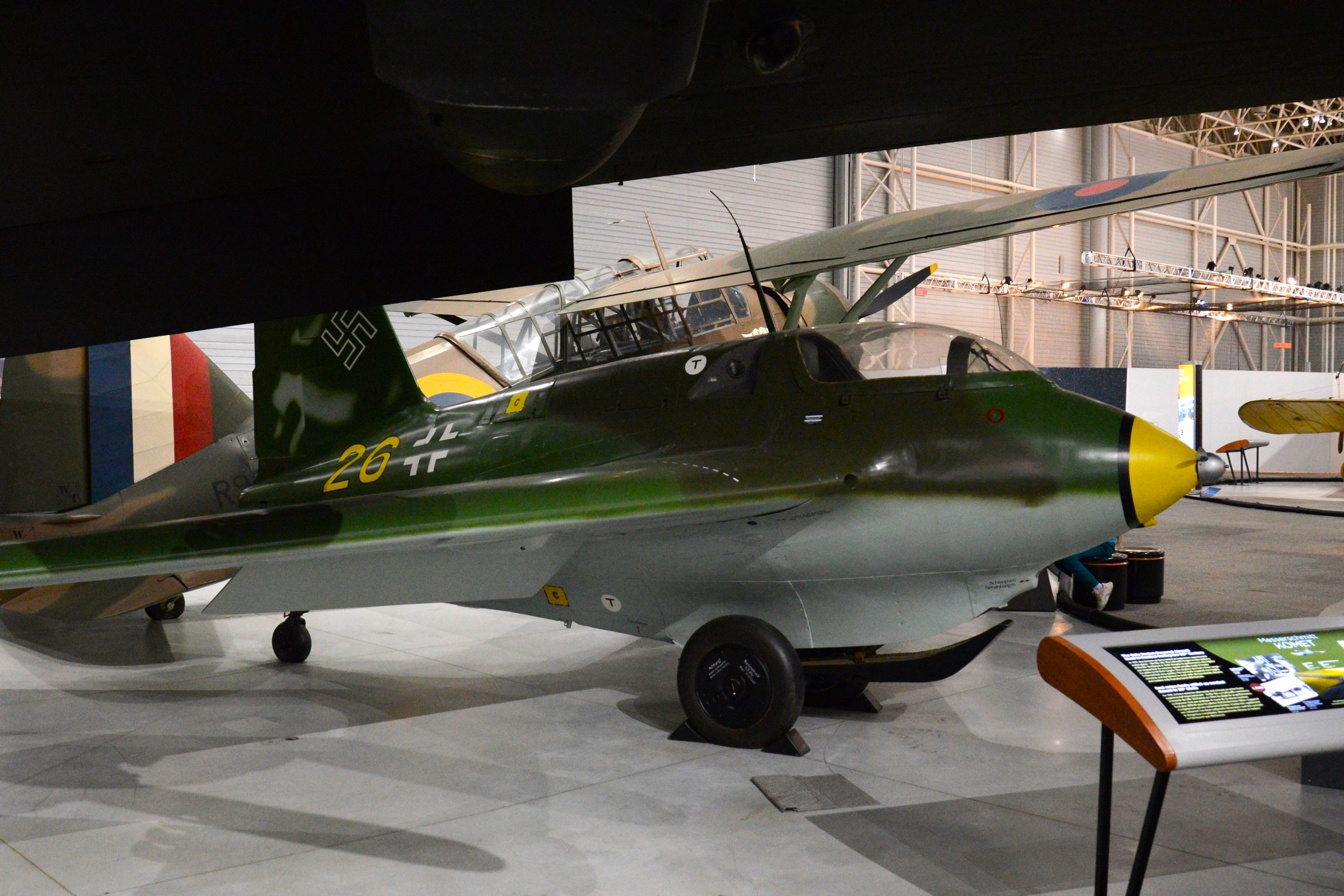
Me 163B, Werknummer 191914, at the Canada Aviation and Space Museum; the tiny propeller operates as a ram air turbine that provides electrical power

- Me 163B, Werknummer 191659 (AM215) or 191914 (AM220), is held at the Canada Aviation and Space Museum, Ottawa. Like two of the British Komets, this aircraft was part of JG 400 and captured at Husum. It was shipped to Canada in 1946.

Werknummer 19116 (but more probable 191916) and 191095 (AM211) also seem to have been held at one time in this museum.

=== Germany ===
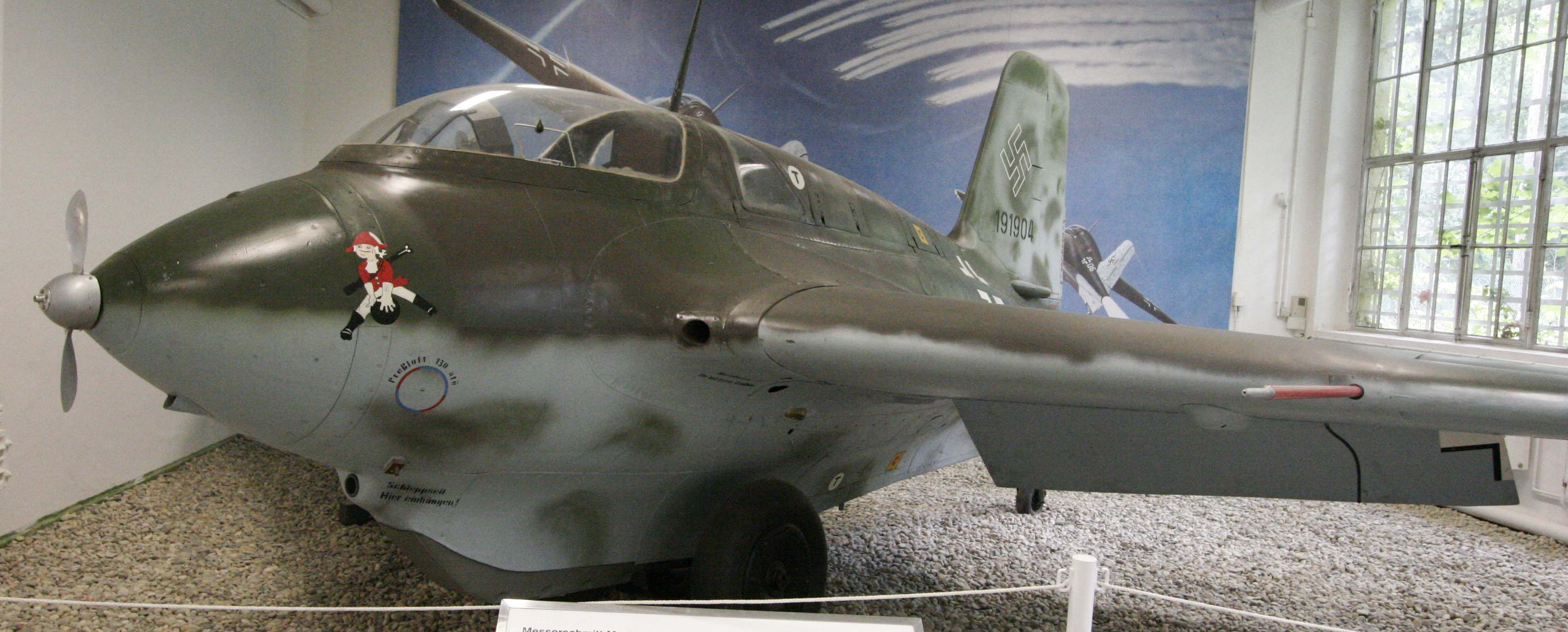
Messerschmitt Me 163 at the Luftwaffenmuseum in Berlin-Gatow

- A Me 163B, Werknummer 191904, "Yellow 25", belonging to JG 400 was captured by the RAF at Husum in 1945. It was sent to England, arriving first at Farnborough, receiving the RAF Air Ministry number AM219 and then transferred to Brize Norton on 8 August 1945, before finally being placed on display at the Station Museum at Colerne. When the museum closed in 1975 the aircraft went to RAF St Athan, receiving the ground maintenance number 8480M. On 5 May 1988 the aircraft was returned to the Bundeswehr's Luftwaffe air arm, and moved to the Luftwaffe Alpha Jet factory at the air base in Oldenburg (JBG 43), not far from the JG 400 unit's wartime base at Bad Zwischenahn, now a golf course. The airframe was in good condition but the cockpit had been stripped and the rocket engine was missing.

Eventually an elderly German woman came forward with Me 163 instruments that her late husband had collected after the war, and the engine was reproduced by a machine shop owned by Me 163 enthusiast Reinhold Opitz. The factory closed in the early 1990s and "Yellow 25" was moved to a small museum created on the site. The museum contained aircraft that had once served as gate guards, monuments and other damaged aircraft previously located on the air base. In 1997 "Yellow 25" was moved to the official Luftwaffe Museum located at the former RAF base at Berlin-Gatow, where it is displayed today alongside a restored Walter HWK 109–509 rocket engine. This particular Me 163B is one of the very few World War II–era German military aircraft, restored and preserved in a German aviation museum, to have a swastika marking, in a "low visibility" white outline form, currently displayed on the tailfin.

- Me 163B, Werknummer 120370, "Yellow 6" of JG 400, is displayed at the Deutsches Museum, Munich. It was originally sent to Britain, where it had received the RAF Air Ministry number AM210. It was given to the Deutsches Museum by RAF Biggin Hill Station. Some claim this is 191316, but that is still at the London Science Museum.

=== United Kingdom ===
Of the 21 aircraft that were captured by the British, at least three have survived. They were assigned the British serial numbers AM200 to AM220.

- Me 163B, Werknummer 191316, "Yellow 6", has been on display at the Science Museum in London, since 1964 with the Walter motor removed for separate display. A second Walter motor and a takeoff dolly are part of the museum's reserve collection and are not generally on display to the public.
- Me 163B, Werknummer 191614, is now displayed at the RAF Museum London, where it was moved from the Royal Air Force Museum Midlands site at RAF Cosford, its former home since 1975. Before then, it was at the Rocket Propulsion Establishment at Westcott, Buckinghamshire.
- Me 163B-1a, Werknummer 191659 and RAF Air Ministry serial number AM215, "Yellow 15", was captured at Husum in 1945 and was sent to the College of Aeronautics at Cranfield, England in 1947. After many years of touring airshows and various outdoor gatherings around the UK it was loaned to the National Museum of Flight at East Fortune Airfield, East Lothian, Scotland in 1976.

=== United States ===
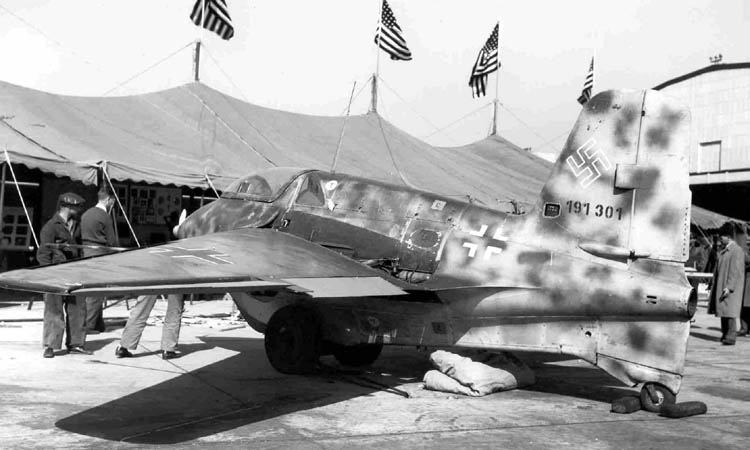
Me 163B 191 301 at Wright Field display in October 1945

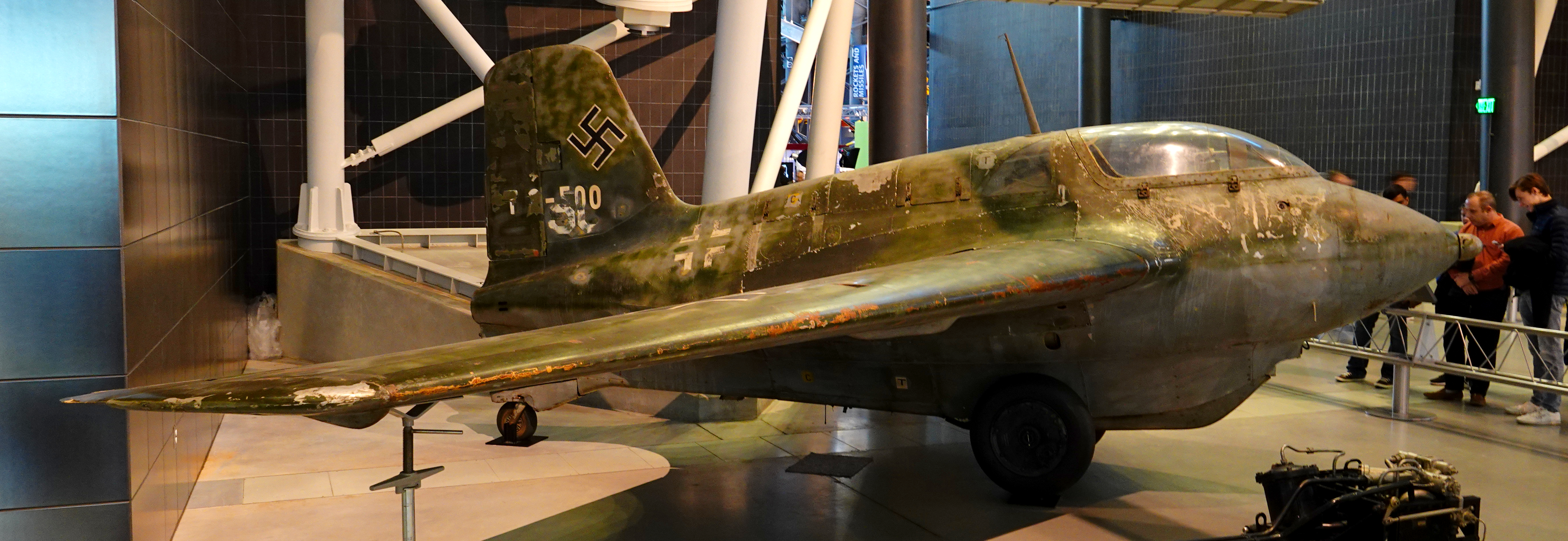
Unrestored Messerschmitt Me 163B Komet at the Udvar-Hazy center

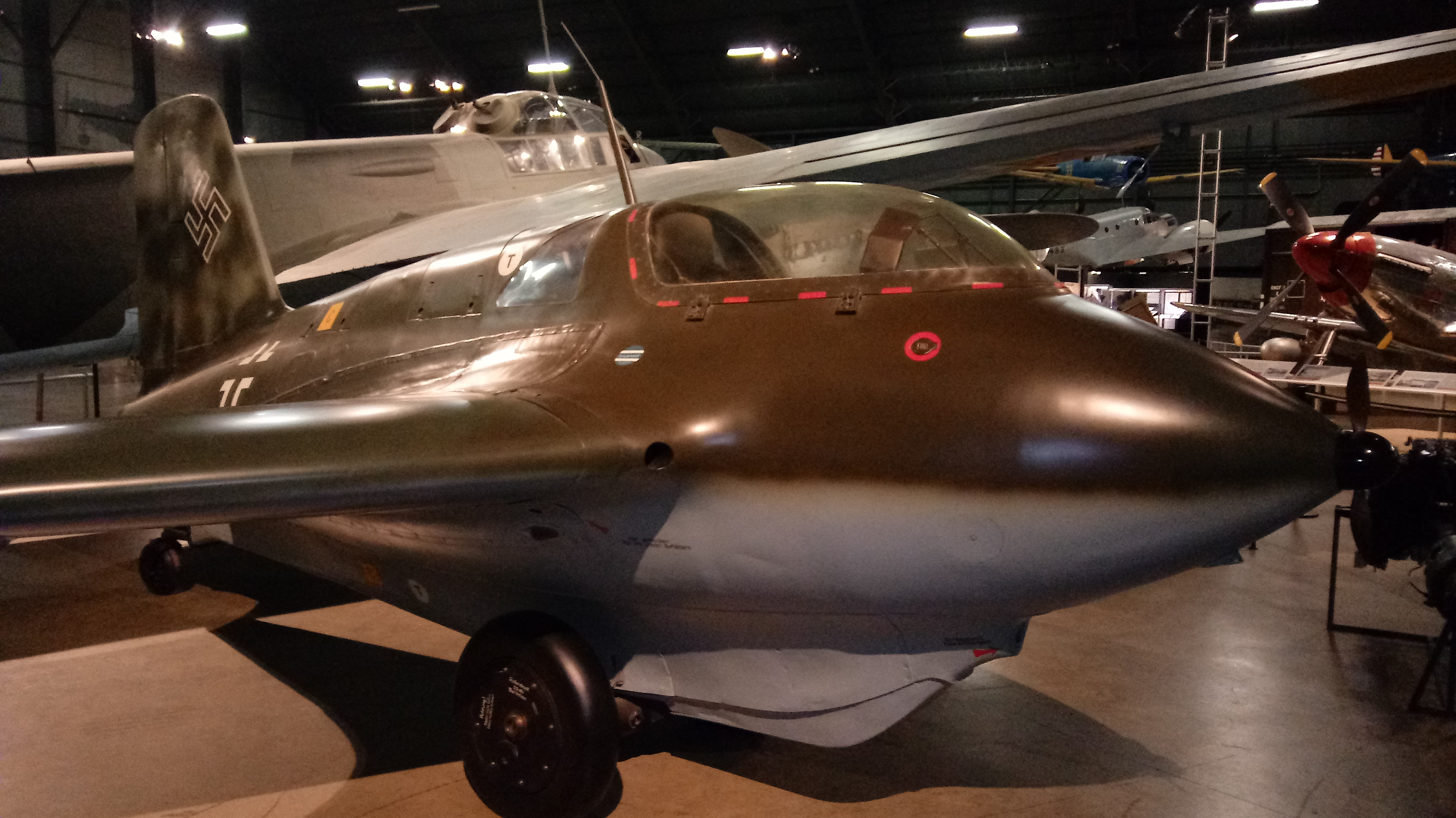
Me 163B at Wright-Patterson National Air Force Museum

- Five Me 163s were originally brought to the United States in 1945, receiving the Foreign Equipment numbers FE-495 and FE-500 to 503. An Me 163 B-1a, Werknummer (serial number) 191301, arrived at Freeman Field, Indiana, during mid-1945, and received the foreign equipment number FE-500. On 12 April 1946, it was flown aboard a cargo aircraft to the U.S. Army Air Forces facility at Muroc dry lake in California for flight testing. Testing began on 3 May 1946 in the presence of Dr. Alexander Lippisch and involved towing the unfueled Komet behind a Boeing B-29 Superfortress to an altitude of 9,000–10,500 m (29,500–34,400 ft) before it was released for a glide back to earth under the control of test pilot Major Gus Lundquist. Powered tests were planned, but not carried out after delamination of the aircraft's wooden wings was discovered. It was then stored at Norton AFB, California until 1954, when it was transferred to the Smithsonian Institution. The aircraft remained on display in an unrestored condition at the museum's Paul E. Garber Preservation, Restoration, and Storage Facility in Suitland, Maryland, until 1996, when it was lent to the Mighty Eighth Air Force Museum in Pooler, Georgia for restoration and display. It has since been returned to the Smithsonian and as of 2011 is on display unrestored at the National Air and Space Museum's Steven F. Udvar-Hazy Center near Washington D.C.
- Me 163B, Werknummer 191 095, is on fully restored display at the National Museum of the United States Air Force at Wright-Patterson AFB near Dayton, Ohio. It was acquired from the Canadian National Aviation Museum (now the Canada Aviation and Space Museum), where it had been restored, and was placed on display 10 December 1999. Komet test pilot Rudolf "Rudi" Opitz was on hand for the dedication of the aircraft and discussed his experiences of flying the rocket-propelled fighter to a standing room only crowd. During the aircraft's restoration in Canada it was discovered that the aircraft had been assembled by French forced laborers who had deliberately sabotaged it by placing stones between the rocket's fuel tanks and its supporting straps. There are also indications that the wing was assembled with contaminated glue. Patriotic French writing was found inside the fuselage. The aircraft is displayed without any unit identification, but has its Werknummer restored to its normal fin location. Fully restored examples of both the Me 163B's single-chamber rocket motor, as well as the only known example in the United States of the experimental twin-chamber Walter 509B rocket motor, are each on display in front, one each to either side, of WkNr. 191 095.

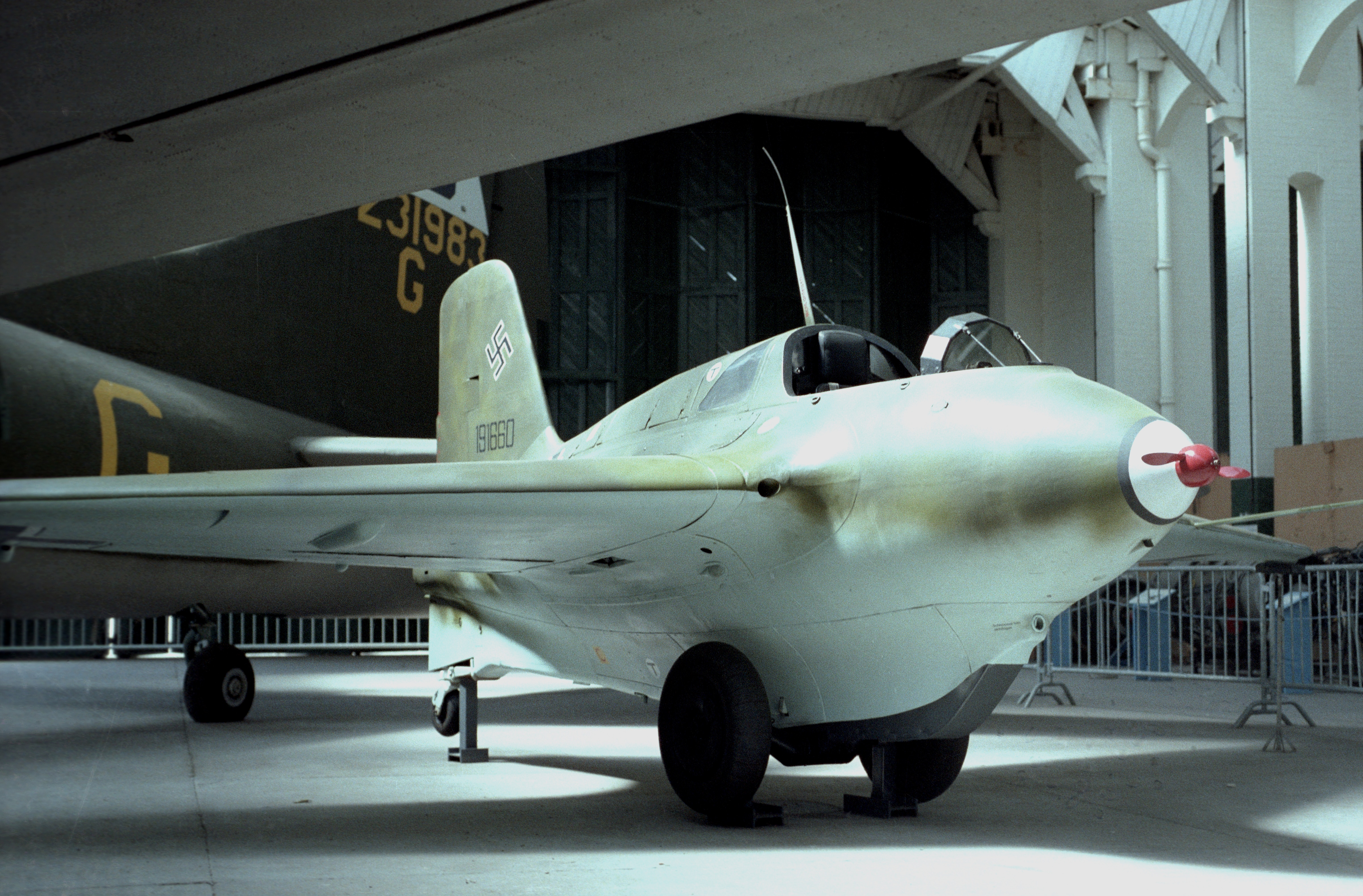
191660 placed alongside a B-17 at Duxford in 1983.

- Me 163B, Werknummer 191660, "Yellow 3", is owned by Paul Allen's Flying Heritage Collection. Between 1961 and 1976, this aircraft was displayed at the Imperial War Museum in London. In 1976, it was moved to the Imperial War Museum Duxford. It underwent a lengthy restoration, beginning in 1997, that was frequently halted as the restorers were diverted to more pressing projects. In May 2005, it was sold, reportedly for £800,000, to raise money for the purchase of a de Havilland/Airco DH.9 as the Duxford museum had no examples of a World War I bomber in its collection. Permission for export was granted by the British government's Department for Culture, Media and Sport as three other Komets were held in British museums.

== Japanese versions ==
As part of their alliance, Germany provided the Japanese Empire with plans and an example of the Me 163. One of the two submarines carrying Me 163 parts did not arrive in Japan, so at the time, the Japanese lacked all of the major parts and construction blueprints, including the turbopump, which they could not make on their own, forcing them to reverse-engineer their own design from information obtained in the Me 163 Erection & Maintenance manual obtained from Germany. The prototype J8M crashed on its first powered flight and was completely destroyed, but several variants were built and flown, including: trainers, fighters, and interceptors, with only minor differences between the versions.

The Navy version, the Mitsubishi J8M1 Shūsui, replaced the Ho 155 cannon with the Navy's 30 mm (1.18 in) Type 5 cannon. Mitsubishi also planned on producing a version of the 163C for the Navy, known as the J8M2 Shūsui Model 21. A version of the 163 D/263 was known as the J8M3 Shusui for the Navy with the Type 5 cannon, and a Ki-202 Shūsui-kai (秋水改; "Autumn Water, modified") with the Ho 155-II for the Army. Trainers were planned, roughly the equivalent of the Me 163 A-0/S; these were known as the Kugisho/Yokosuka MXY8 (Yokoi Ku-13) Akigusa (秋草; "Autumn Grass") — an unpowered glider trainer — and Kugisho/Yokosuka MXY9 Shūka (秋花; "Autumn Flower") — a Tsu-11-powered motorjet trainer)

One complete example of the Japanese aircraft survives at the Planes of Fame Air Museum in the United States. The fuselage of a second aircraft is displayed at the Mitsubishi company's Komaki Plant Museum, at Komaki, Aichi Prefecture, in Japan.

== Replicas ==
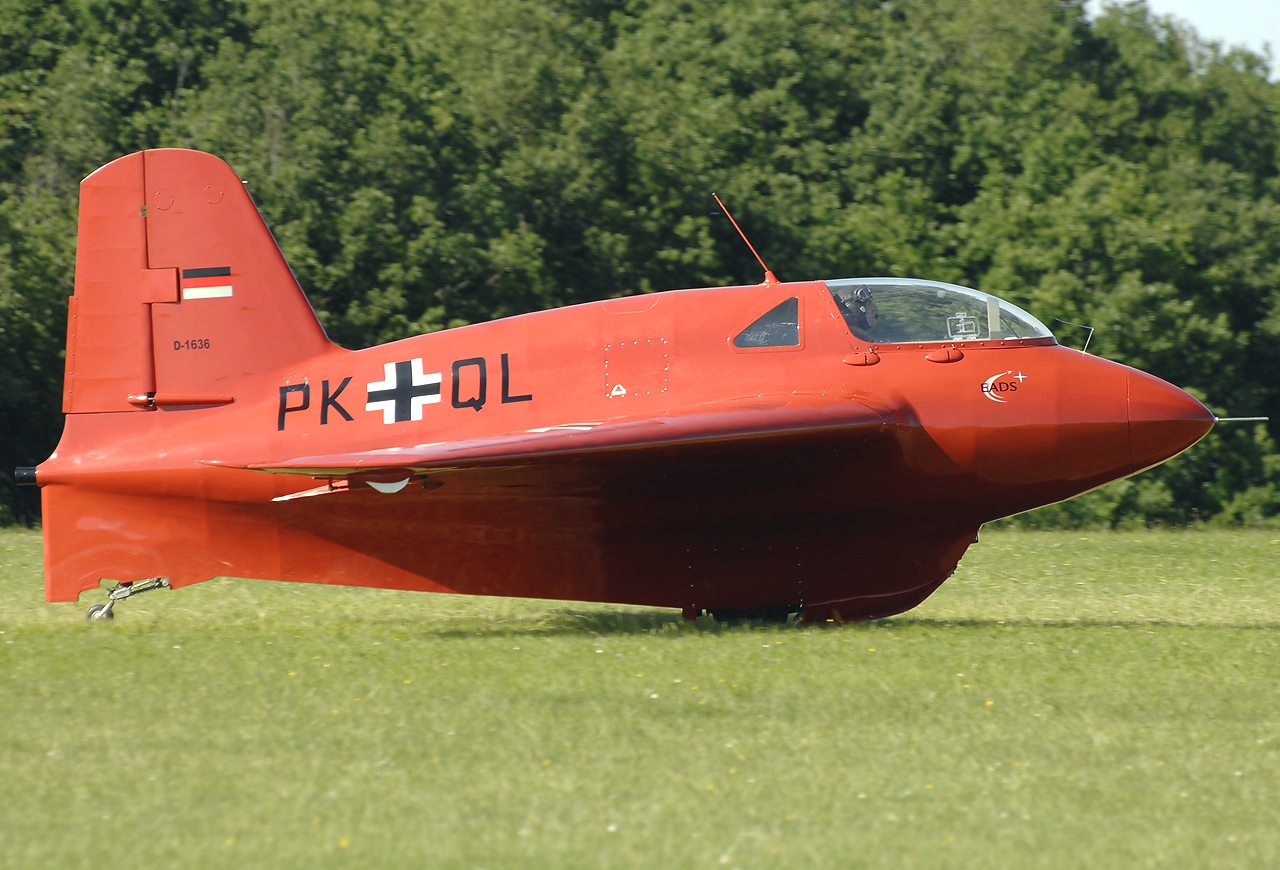
The Me 163 replica glider, D-1636, Aérodrome de La Ferté-Alais, France, 2009

A flying replica Me 163 was constructed between 1994 and 1996 by Joseph Kurtz, a former Luftwaffe pilot who trained to fly Me 163s, but who never flew in combat. He subsequently sold the aircraft to EADS. The replica is an unpowered glider whose shape matches that of an Me 163, although its construction is completely different: the glider is built of wood with an empty weight of 285 kilograms (628 lb), a fraction of the weight of a wartime aircraft. Reportedly, it has excellent flying characteristics. The glider is painted red to represent the Me 163 flown by Wolfgang Späte. It is not currently flown, but is exhibited at the Messerschmitt Museum of Flight.

In the early 2000s, a rocket-powered airworthy replica, the Komet II, was proposed by XCOR Aerospace, a former aerospace company that had previously built the XCOR EZ-Rocket rocket-plane. Although outwardly the same as a wartime aircraft, the Komet II's design would have differed considerably for safety reasons. It would have been partially constructed with composite materials, powered by one of XCOR's own simpler and safer, pressure fed, liquid oxygen/alcohol engines, and retractable undercarriage would have been used instead of a takeoff dolly and landing skid.

Several static replica Me 163s are exhibited in museums.

== Specifications: Me 163B-1a ==
Messerschmitt Me 163B 3-view drawings

Data from The Warplanes of the Third Reich, Profile No225: Messerschmitt Me 163 Komet

General characteristics

- Crew: 1
- Capacity: (Me 163S + 1)
- Length: 5.7 m (18 ft 8 in)
- Wingspan: 9.3 m (30 ft 6 in)
- Height: 2.5 m (8 ft 2 in)
- Wing area: 19.6 m^{2} (211 sq ft)
- Empty weight: 1,905 kg (4,200 lb)
- Max takeoff weight: 4,309 kg (9,500 lb)
- Fuel capacity:
  - C-Stoff (fuel) 468 kg (1,032 lb)
  - T-Stoff (oxidizer) 1,550 kg (3,420 lb)
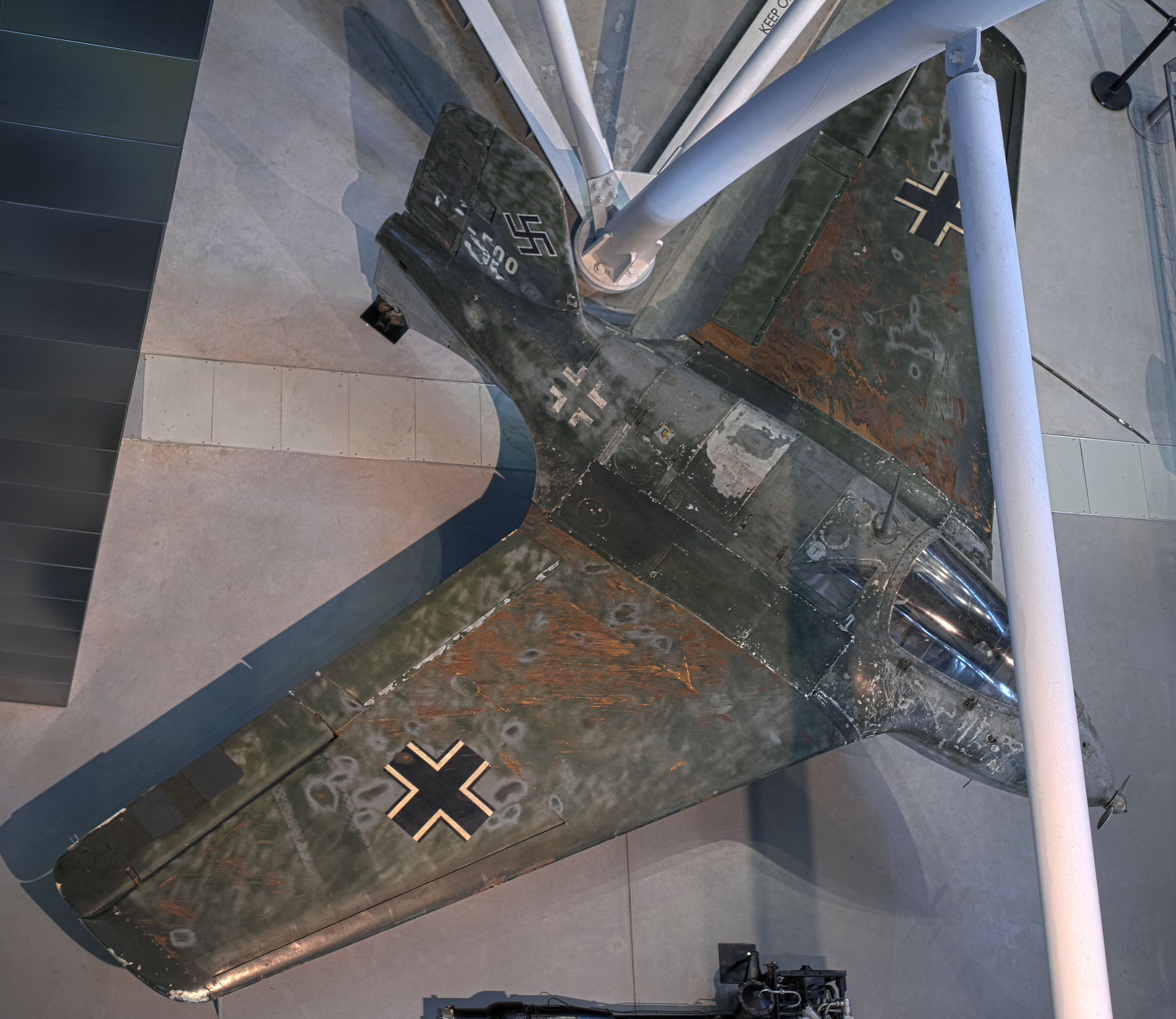
    Plan view of the un-restored Messerschmitt Me 163 Komet at the Smithsonian Institute's Udvar-Hazy Center in Chantilly, Virginia, USA.
- Powerplant: 1 × Hellmuth Walter Kommanditgesellschaft HWK 109-509A-2 bi-propellant liquid-fuelled rocket motor, 14.71 kN (3,307 lbf) thrust maximum; 980 N (220 lbf) minimum, fully variable

Performance

- Never exceed speed: 900 km/h (560 mph, 490 kn) at all altitudes, sea level to 12,000 m (39,000 ft)
- Flap limiting speed: 300 km/h (190 mph; 160 kn)
- Rotate speed at take-off: 280 km/h (170 mph; 150 kn)
- Best climbing speed: 700–720 km/h (430–450 mph; 380–390 kn)
- Endurance: 7.5 mins powered
- Rate of climb: 81 m/s (16,000 ft/min)
- Time to altitude: From standing start
  - 2,000 m (6,600 ft) in 1.48 min
  - 4,000 m (13,000 ft) in 2.02 min
  - 6,000 m (20,000 ft) in 2.27 min
  - 8,000 m (26,000 ft) in 2.54 min
  - 10,000 m (33,000 ft) in 3.19 min
  - 12,000 m (39,000 ft) in 3.45 min
- Wing loading: 209 kg/m^{2} (43 lb/sq ft) at maximum take-off weight
- Thrust/weight: 0.42

Armament

- Guns:
  - 2 × 30 mm (1.181 in) Rheinmetall Borsig MK 108 cannon with 60 rpg

== See also ==
- Hanna Reitsch
- Type XVII submarine

Related development

- DFS-39
- DFS-194
- Messerschmitt Me 263
- Mikoyan-Gurevich I-270
- Mitsubishi J8M

Aircraft of comparable role, configuration, and era

- Bachem Ba 349
- Bereznyak-Isayev BI-1
- Focke-Wulf Volksjäger

Related lists

- List of aircraft of World War II
- List of military aircraft of Germany
- List of fighter aircraft
- List of rocket-powered aircraft
- List of World War II military aircraft of Germany
- Wunderwaffe
