= List of X-1 flights =

The Bell X-1 was the first crewed airplane to exceed the speed of sound in level flight and was the first of the X-planes.

== XS-1 pilots ==
Pilot	Agency	Flights	Aircraft
Joseph Cannon	Bell Aircraft	1	46-064
Chalmers "Slick" Goodlin	Bell Aircraft	26	46-062 (9), 46-063 (17)
Alvin "Tex" Johnston	Bell Aircraft	1	46-063
Jack Woolams	Bell Aircraft	10	46-062
Robert Champine	NACA	13	46-063
Scott Crossfield	NACA	10	46-063
John H. Griffith	NACA	9	46-063
Herb Hoover	NACA	14	46-063
Howard Lilly	NACA	6	46-063
Joseph A. Walker	NACA	2	46-063
Fred Ascani	USAF	1	46-063
Albert Boyd	USAF	1	46-062
Frank Everest	USAF	10	46-062
James Fitzgerald	USAF	7	46-062
Patrick Fleming	USAF	1	46-062
Richard Johnson	USAF	1	46-062
Gustav Lundquist	USAF	6	46-062
Jack Ridley	USAF	5	46-062
Chuck Yeager	USAF	34	46-062 (33), 46-063 (1)

== XS-1 flights ==
Vehicle Flight #	Date	Pilot	Aircraft	Agency	Velocity -Mach-	Altitude: m -	Comments
XS-1 #1	January 19, 1946	Jack Woolams	46-062	Bell 1 #1	?	?	Pinecastle AAF Base, FL. Glide flight.
XS-1 #2	February 5, 1946	Jack Woolams	46-062	Bell 2 #1	?	?	Pinecastle AAF Base, FL. Glide flight.
XS-1 #3	February 5, 1946	Jack Woolams	46-062	Bell 3 #1	?	?	Pinecastle AAF Base, FL. 2nd flight on this date. Glide flight.
XS-1 #4	February 11, 1946	Jack Woolams	46-062	Bell 4 #1	?	?	Pinecastle AAF Base, FL. Gear retracts after landing, left wing damage. Glide flight.
XS-1 #5	February 19, 1946	Jack Woolams	46-062	Bell 5 #1	?	?	Pinecastle AAF Base, FL. Nose Gear retracted on landing. Landing gear door damage. Glide flight.
XS-1 #6	February 25, 1946	Jack Woolams	46-062	Bell 6 #1	?	?	Pinecastle AAF Base, FL; Directional stability tests. Glide flight.
XS-1 #7	February 25, 1946	Jack Woolams	46-062	Bell 7 #1	?	?	Pinecastle AAF Base, FL. Longitudinal stability tests. 2nd flight on this date. Glide flight.
XS-1 #8	February 26, 1946	Jack Woolams	46-062	Bell 8 #1	?	?	Pinecastle AAF Base, FL. Dynamic stability tests. Glide flight.
XS-1 #9	February 26, 1946	Jack Woolams	46-062	Bell 9 #1	?	?	Pinecastle AAF Base, FL. Roll rate tests. 2nd flight on this date. Glide flight.
XS-1 #10	March 6, 1946	Jack Woolams	46-062	Bell 10 #1	?	?	Pinecastle AAF Base, FL. Longitudinal stability tests. Glide flight.
XS-1 #11	October 11, 1946	Chalmers Goodlin	46-063	Bell 1 #2	?	?	All XS-1 flights now from Muroc AAF Base, CA. Glide flight, familiarization.
XS-1 #12	October 14, 1946	Chalmers Goodlin	46-063	Bell 2 #2	?	?	Glide flight.
XS-1 #13	October 17, 1946	Chalmers Goodlin	46-063	Bell 3 #2	?	?	Glide flight.
XS-1 #14	December 2, 1946	Chalmers Goodlin	46-063	Bell 4 #2	?	?	Glide flight. Check fuel jettison system.
XS-1 #15	December 9, 1946	Chalmers Goodlin	46-063	Bell 5 #2	0.79	10,675	First powered flight. Minor engine fire.
XS-1 #16	December 20, 1946	Chalmers Goodlin	46-063	Bell 6 #2	?	?	Familiarization flight. Powered.
XS-1 #17	January 8, 1947	Chalmers Goodlin	46-063	Bell 7 #2	0.80	10,675	Buffet boundary investigation.
XS-1 #18	January 17, 1947	Chalmers Goodlin	46-063	Bell 8 #2	0.80	?	Buffet boundary investigation. Full power climb.
XS-1 #19	January 22, 1947	Chalmers Goodlin	46-063	Bell 9 #2	?	?	Buffet boundary investigation. Full power climb. Telemetry failed.
XS-1 #20	January 23, 1947	Chalmers Goodlin	46-063	Bell 10 #2	?	?	Buffet boundary investigation. Full power climb.
XS-1 #21	January 30, 1947	Chalmers Goodlin	46-063	Bell 11 #2	0.75	?	Accelerated stalls. Partial power.
XS-1 #22	January 31, 1947	Chalmers Goodlin	46-063	Bell 12 #2	0.70	?	Buffet boundary investigation.
XS-1 #23	February 5, 1947	Chalmers Goodlin	46-063	Bell 13 #2	?	?	Machmeter calibration.
XS-1 #24	February 7, 1947	Chalmers Goodlin	46-063	Bell 14 #2	?	?	Buffet boundary investigation.
XS-1 #25	February 19, 1947	Chalmers Goodlin	46-063	Bell 15 #2	?	?	Accelerated stalls.
XS-1 #26	February 21, 1947	Chalmers Goodlin	46-063	Bell 16 #2	?	?	Aborted after launch. Low engine-chamber pressure.
XS-1 #27	April 10, 1947	Chalmers Goodlin	46-062	Bell 11 #1	?	?	Glide flight, stall check.
XS-1 #28	April 11, 1947	Chalmers Goodlin	46-062	Bell 12 #1	?	?	First powered flight of aircraft #1. Nosewheel damaged.
XS-1 #29	April 29, 1947	Chalmers Goodlin	46-062	Bell 13 #1	?	?	Handling qualities check.
XS-1 #30	April 30, 1947	Chalmers Goodlin	46-062	Bell 14 #1	?	?	Handling qualities check.
XS-1 #31	May 5, 1947	Chalmers Goodlin	46-062	Bell 15 #1	?	?	Handling qualities check.
XS-1 #32	May 15, 1947	Chalmers Goodlin	46-062	Bell 16 #1	?	?	Buffet boundary test. Aileron damper malfunction.
XS-1 #33	May 19, 1947	Chalmers Goodlin	46-062	Bell 17 #1	?	?	Buffet boundary test.
XS-1 #34	May 21, 1947	Chalmers Goodlin	46-062	Bell 18 #1	?	?	Buffet boundary test.
XS-1 #35	May 22, 1947	Alvin "Tex" Johnston	46-063	Bell 17 #2	0.72	?	Pilot familiarization. 8 g (78 m/s²) pullout.
XS-1 #36	May 29, 1947	Chalmers Goodlin	46-063	Bell 18 #2	0.72	?	Airspeed calibration. End of Bell contractor program.
XS-1 #37	June 5, 1947	Chalmers Goodlin	46-062	Bell 19 #1	?	?	Demonstration for Aviation Writers Association.
XS-1 #38	August 6, 1947	Chuck Yeager	46-062	USAF glide 1	?	?	Pilot familiarization.
XS-1 #39	August 7, 1947	Chuck Yeager	46-062	USAF glide 2	?	?	Glide flight.
XS-1 #40	August 8, 1947	Chuck Yeager	46-062	USAF glide 3	?	?	Glide flight.
XS-1 #41	August 29, 1947	Chuck Yeager	46-062	USAF powered 1	0.85	?	First USAF powered flight.
XS-1 #42	September 4, 1947	Chuck Yeager	46-062	USAF 2	0.89	?	Telemetry failure. Flight had to be repeated.
XS-1 #43	September 8, 1947	Chuck Yeager	46-062	USAF 3	?	?	-
XS-1 #44	September 10, 1947	Chuck Yeager	46-062	USAF 4	0.91	?	Stability and control test.
XS-1 #45	September 12, 1947	Chuck Yeager	46-062	USAF 5	0.92	?	Check elevator, stabilizer and buffet.
XS-1 #46	September 25, 1947	Chuck Yeager	46-063	NACA acceptance	?	?	Number 4 engine tube burned out.
XS-1 #47	October 3, 1947	Chuck Yeager	46-062	USAF 6	?	?	Check elevator, stabilizer and buffet.
XS-1 #48	October 8, 1947	Chuck Yeager	46-062	USAF 7	0.925	?	Airspeed calibration flight.
XS-1 #49	October 10, 1947	Chuck Yeager	46-062	USAF 8	0.997	?	Stability and control test.
XS-1 #50	October 14, 1947	Chuck Yeager	46-062	USAF 9	1.06	13,115	First supersonic flight. 1,126 km/h.
XS-1 #51	October 21, 1947	Herb Hoover	46-063	NACA glide 1	?	?	Familiarization flight. Stall check. Nose wheel collapsed at landing.
XS-1 #52	October 27, 1947	Chuck Yeager	46-062	USAF 10	?	?	Power failure. Rocket didn't fire.
XS-1 #53	October 28, 1947	Chuck Yeager	46-062	USAF 11	?	?	Telemetry failure.
XS-1 #54	October 29, 1947	Chuck Yeager	46-062	USAF 12	?	?	Telemetry failure.
XS-1 #55	October 31, 1947	Chuck Yeager	46-062	USAF 13	?	?	-
XS-1 #56	November 3, 1947	Chuck Yeager	46-062	USAF 14	?	?	-
XS-1 #57	November 4, 1947	Chuck Yeager	46-062	USAF 15	?	?	-
XS-1 #58	November 6, 1947	Chuck Yeager	46-062	USAF 16	1.35	14,823	First-ever aircraft flight to exceed July 6, 1944, flight speed record (702 mph/1,130 km/h) of Heinz Dittmar in Me 163B V18 prototype
XS-1 #59	December 16, 1947	Herb Hoover	46-063	NACA powered 1	0.84	?	No record of telemetry.
XS-1 #60	December 17, 1947	Herb Hoover	46-063	NACA 2	0.80	?	Familiarization.
XS-1 #61	January 6, 1948	Herb Hoover	46-063	NACA 3	0.74	?	Turns, pull-ups to buffet.
XS-1 #62	January 8, 1948	Herb Hoover	46-063	NACA 4	0.83	?	Turns, pull-ups to buffet.
XS-1 #63	January 9, 1948	Howard Lilly	46-063	NACA 5	?	?	Pilot familiarization.
XS-1 #64	January 15, 1948	Howard Lilly	46-063	NACA 6	0.76	?	Turns, pull-ups to buffet. Sideslips.
XS-1 #65	January 16, 1948	Chuck Yeager	46-062	USAF 17	0.9	?	Airspeed calibration.
XS-1 #66	January 21, 1948	Herb Hoover	46-063	NACA 7	0.82	8,845	Stabilizer effectiveness test.
XS-1 #67	January 22, 1948	Chuck Yeager	46-062	USAF 18	1.2	?	Pressure distribution survey.
XS-1 #68	January 23, 1948	Herb Hoover	46-063	NACA 8	0.83	?	Attempted high speed flight. Aborted due to drop in chamber pressure.
XS-1 #69	January 27, 1948	Herb Hoover	46-063	NACA 9	0.925	11,590	High speed flight. Cylinders 2 and 3 didn't fire.
XS-1 #70	January 30, 1948	Chuck Yeager	46-062	USAF 19	1.1	?	Pressure distribution survey.
XS-1 #71	February 28, 1948	James Fitzgerald	46-062	USAF 20	?	?	Engine fire at launch. Propellants jettisoned. Glide flight.
XS-1 #72	March 4, 1948	Herb Hoover	46-063	NACA 10	0.943	12,200	High speed flight.
XS-1 #73	March 10, 1948	Herb Hoover	46-063	NACA 11	1.065	?	First NACA supersonic flight. Nose wheel didn't extend at landing. Minor damage.
XS-1 #74	March 11, 1948	Chuck Yeager	46-062	USAF 21	1.25	?	Reached Mach 1.25 in a dive.
XS-1 #75	March 22, 1948	Herb Hoover	46-063	NACA 12	1.12	?	Stability and loads test.
XS-1 #76	March 26, 1948	Chuck Yeager	46-062	USAF 22	1.45	12,239	Reached Mach 1.45 in a dive. Highest speed achieved in original XS-1.
XS-1 #77	March 30, 1948	Herb Hoover	46-063	NACA 13	0.90	?	Stability and loads test.
XS-1 #78	March 31, 1948	Howard Lilly	46-063	NACA 14	1.10	?	Stability and loads test.
XS-1 #79	March 31, 1948	Chuck Yeager	46-062	USAF 23	?	?	Engine shutdown after launch. Propellants jettisoned. Glide flight.
XS-1 #80	April 5, 1948	Howard Lilly	46-063	NACA 15	?	?	Engine didn't ignite. Propellants jettisoned. Glide flight.
XS-1 #81	April 6, 1948	James Fitzgerald	46-062	USAF 24	1.1	12,505	Pilot check flight. All 4 cylinders fired.
XS-1 #82	April 7, 1948	Gustav Lundquist	46-062	USAF 25	?	?	Glide flight.
XS-1 #83	April 8, 1948	James Fitzgerald	46-062	USAF 26	?	?	Familiarization flight.
XS-1 #84	April 9, 1948	Howard Lilly	46-063	NACA 16	0.89	?	Stability and loads test.
XS-1 #85	April 9, 1948	Gustav Lundquist	46-062	USAF 27	?	?	Powered pilot-check flight.
XS-1 #86	April 16, 1948	Howard Lilly	46-063	NACA 17	?	?	Stability and loads test. Nose wheel collapsed on landing causing moderate damage.
XS-1 #87	April 16, 1948	Gustav Lundquist	46-062	USAF 28	?	?	Pressure distribution test. Only cylinders 2 and 4 fired.
XS-1 #88	April 26, 1948	James Fitzgerald	46-062	USAF 29	0.9	?	Aborted due to rocket malfunction.
XS-1 #89	April 29, 1948	Gustav Lundquist	46-062	USAF 30	1.18	?	Pressure distribution test.
XS-1 #90	May 4, 1948	James Fitzgerald	46-062	USAF 31	1.15	?	Pressure distribution test.
XS-1 #91	May 21, 1948	Gustav Lundquist	46-062	USAF 32	0.92	?	Stability, control and buffeting test.
XS-1 #92	May 25, 1948	James Fitzgerald	46-062	USAF 33	1.08	?	Wing, tail loads, buffet test.
XS-1 #93	May 26, 1948	Chuck Yeager	46-062	USAF 34	1.05	?	Wing, tail loads, buffet test.
XS-1 #94	June 3, 1948	Gustav Lundquist	46-062	USAF 35	?	?	Left main landing gear door opened in flight. Nose wheel collapsed on landing.
XS-1 #95	November 1, 1948	Herb Hoover	46-063	NACA 18	0.9	?	Stability and control test. Number 4 cylinder did not fire.
XS-1 #96	November 15, 1948	Herb Hoover	46-063	NACA 19	0.98	?	Stability, control and pressure distribution test.
XS-1 #97	November 23, 1948	Robert Champine	46-063	NACA 20	?	?	Pilot familiarization. Handling qualities and pressure distribution test.
XS-1 #98	November 29, 1948	Robert Champine	46-063	NACA 21	0.88	?	Handling qualities and pressure distribution test.
XS-1 #99	November 30, 1948	Robert Champine	46-063	NACA 22	?	?	Handling qualities and pressure distribution test.
XS-1 #100	December 1, 1948	Chuck Yeager	46-062	USAF 36	1.0	?	Wing, tail loads and handling qualities at mach 1.
XS-1 #101	December 2, 1948	Robert Champine	46-063	NACA 23	1.0	?	Handling qualities and pressure distribution test.
XS-1 #102	December 13, 1948	Chuck Yeager	46-062	USAF 37	1.0	?	Wing, tail loads and handling qualities at mach 1.
XS-1 #103	December 23, 1948	Chuck Yeager	46-062	USAF 38	1.09	?	Wing, tail loads during supersonic flight at high altitude.
XS-1 #104	January 5, 1949	Chuck Yeager	46-062	USAF 39	1.03	23,000	Ground takeoff with 50% fuel load.
XS-1 #105	March 11, 1949	Jack Ridley	46-062	USAF 40	1.23	10,675	Familiarization flight. Minor engine fire caused by loose igniter.
XS-1 #106	March 16, 1949	Albert Boyd	46-062	USAF 41	?	?	Familiarization flight. Inflight engine fire and shutdown.
XS-1 #107	March 21, 1949	Frank Everest	46-062	USAF 42	1.22	12,200	Familiarization flight.
XS-1 #108	March 25, 1949	Frank Everest	46-062	USAF 43	1.24	14,640	Pressure suit altitude test. Engine fire and automatic shutdown.
XS-1 #109	April 14, 1949	Jack Ridley	46-062	USAF 44	1.1	12,200	Accelerated stall check at transonic speeds.
XS-1 #110	April 19, 1949	Frank Everest	46-062	USAF 45	?	?	High altitude flight attempt. Only 2 cylinders fired.
XS-1 #111	May 2, 1949	Chuck Yeager	46-062	USAF 46	?	?	Engine malfunction, faulty ignition plug.
XS-1 #112	May 5, 1949	Frank Everest	46-062	USAF 47	?	?	Engine chamber exploded. Rudder jammed. Safe landing.
XS-1 #113	May 6, 1949	Robert Champine	46-063	NACA 24	0.88	12,200	Instrumentation check.
XS-1 #114	May 13, 1949	Robert Champine	46-063	NACA 25	0.91	?	Spanwise pressure distribution. Stability and control.
XS-1 #115	May 27, 1949	Robert Champine	46-063	NACA 26	0.91	?	Spanwise pressure distribution. Stability and control. Stabilizer more effective than elevator in mach 0.91 pull-ups.
XS-1 #116	June 16, 1949	Robert Champine	46-063	NACA 27	0.91	?	Spanwise pressure distribution. Stability and control. Rolls, pull-ups at mach 0.91
XS-1 #117	June 23, 1949	Robert Champine	46-063	NACA 28	?	?	Spanwise pressure distribution. Stability and control. Rolls, pull-ups, stabilizer effectiveness.
XS-1 #118	July 11, 1949	Robert Champine	46-063	NACA 29	0.91	?	Spanwise pressure distribution. Stability and control. Cylinder 2 didn't fire.
XS-1 #119	July 19, 1949	Robert Champine	46-063	NACA 30	0.91	?	Spanwise pressure distribution. Stability and control. Cylinder 2 didn't fire.
XS-1 #120	July 25, 1949	Frank Everest	46-062	USAF 48	?	20,388	High altitude flight.
XS-1 #121	July 27, 1949	Robert Champine	46-063	NACA 31	?	?	Spanwise pressure distribution. Stability and control. Rolls, pull-ups, stabilizer effectiveness.
XS-1 #122	August 4, 1949	Robert Champine	46-063	NACA 32	?	?	Spanwise pressure distribution. Stability and control. Rolls, pull-ups, stabilizer effectiveness.
XS-1 #123	August 8, 1949	Frank Everest	46-062	USAF 49	?	21,930	High altitude flight.
XS-1 #124	August 25, 1949	Frank Everest	46-062	USAF 50	?	21,000	First use of partial pressure suit. Cabin lost pressure at 21,000 m. Pilot made safe emergency descent.
XS-1 #125	September 23, 1949	John Griffith	46-063	NACA 33	0.9	?	Pilot familiarization.
XS-1 #126	October 6, 1949	Patrick Fleming	46-062	USAF 51	?	?	Pilot familiarization.
XS-1 #127	October 26, 1949	Richard Johnson	46-062	USAF 52	?	?	Pilot familiarization.
XS-1 #128	November 29, 1949	Frank Everest	46-062	USAF 53	?	?	High-altitude wing, tail loads test.
XS-1 #129	November 30, 1949	John Griffith	46-063	NACA 34	0.91	?	-
XS-1 #130	December 2, 1949	Frank Everest	46-062	USAF 54	?	?	High-altitude wing, tail loads test.
XS-1 #131	February 21, 1950	Frank Everest	46-062	USAF 55	?	?	Wing, tail loads test.
XS-1 #132	April 26, 1950	Chuck Yeager	46-062	USAF 56	?	?	Lateral stability, control test.
XS-1 #133	May 5, 1950	Jack Ridley	46-062	USAF 57	?	?	Buffeting, wing, tail loads test.
XS-1 #134	May 8, 1950	Jack Ridley	46-062	USAF 58	?	?	Buffeting, wing, tail loads test.
XS-1 #135	May 12, 1950	John Griffith	46-063	NACA 35	?	?	Spanwise pressure distribution. Stability and control. Rolls, pull-ups.
XS-1 #136	May 12, 1950	Chuck Yeager	46-062	USAF 59	?	?	Last XS-1 #1 flight. Flown for movie, "Test Pilot".
XS-1 #137	May 17, 1950	John Griffith	46-063	NACA 36	1.13	12,810	Spanwise pressure distribution. Stability and control. Rolls, pull-ups.
XS-1 #138	May 26, 1950	John Griffith	46-063	NACA 37	1.2	?	Spanwise pressure distribution. Stability and control. Rolls, pull-ups. Nose wheel collapsed on landing.
XS-1 #139	August 9, 1950	John Griffith	46-063	NACA 38	0.98	?	Pressure distribution. Stability and control. Stabilizer check.
XS-1 #140	August 11, 1950	John Griffith	46-063	NACA 39	?	?	Pressure distribution. Stability and control. Stabilizer check.
XS-1 #141	September 21, 1950	John Griffith	46-063	NACA 40	0.90	?	Pressure distribution, stability, control, stabilizer check. Drag test. Pull-ups.
XS-1 #142	October 4, 1950	John Griffith	46-063	NACA 41	?	?	Pressure distribution, stability, control, stabilizer check. Drag test. Pull-ups.
XS-1 #143	April 6, 1951	Chuck Yeager	46-063	NACA 42	?	?	Flown for movie, "Jet Pilot". Minor engine fire. No damage.
XS-1 #144	April 20, 1951	Scott Crossfield	46-063	NACA 43	1.07	?	Pilot familiarization.
XS-1 #145	April 27, 1951	Scott Crossfield	46-063	NACA 44	?	?	Plane and instrument check.
XS-1 #146	May 15, 1951	Scott Crossfield	46-063	NACA 45	0.90	?	Wing loads, aileron effectiveness. Aileron rolls at mach .9.
XS-1 #147	July 12, 1951	Scott Crossfield	46-063	NACA 46	1.07	?	Wing loads, aileron effectiveness. Aileron rolls at mach 1.07.
XS-1 #148	July 20, 1951	Scott Crossfield	46-063	NACA 47	0.88	?	Wing loads, aileron effectiveness. Rudder fixed aileron rolls left and right, from mach 0.70 to mach 0.88.
XS-1 #149	July 20, 1951	Joseph Cannon	46-064	Bell 1 #3	?	?	Glide flight. First and only free flight for XS-1 #3. Known as "Queenie".
XS-1 #150	July 31, 1951	Scott Crossfield	46-063	NACA 48	?	?	Wing loads, aileron effectiveness.
XS-1 #151	August 3, 1951	Scott Crossfield	46-063	NACA 49	?	?	Wing loads, aileron effectiveness.
XS-1 #152	August 8, 1951	Scott Crossfield	46-063	NACA 50	?	?	Wing loads, aileron effectiveness. Elevator and stabilizer pull-ups.
XS-1 #153	August 10, 1951	Scott Crossfield	46-063	NACA 51	?	?	Wing loads, aileron effectiveness. Elevator and stabilizer pull-ups, clean stall.
XS-1 #154	August 27, 1951	Joseph Walker	46-063	NACA 52	1.16	13,420	Pilot familiarization.
XS-1 #155	September 5, 1951	Scott Crossfield	46-063	NACA 53	1.07	?	Fuselage pressure survey. Stabilizer pull-ups. Cylinder 1 didn't fire.
XS-1 #156	May 10, 1950	Fred Ascani	46-063	NACA/USAF	?	?	Pilot familiarization. Gen. Ascani says he flew the X-1 in the "Fall of 1951". Most sources do not have a record of this flight. General Ascani's Form 5 was located a few years prior to his passing and the entry for his flight in the X-1 was 10 May 1950.
XS-1 #157	October 23, 1951	Joseph Walker	46-063	NACA 54	?	?	Two ignition attempts. Engine cutout. Propellants jettisoned. Glide flight. Aircraft grounded due to possible nitrogen sphere fatigue.

== See also ==
- Bell X-1
- Chuck Yeager
