= ECAPS =

Swedish spacecraft propulsion company

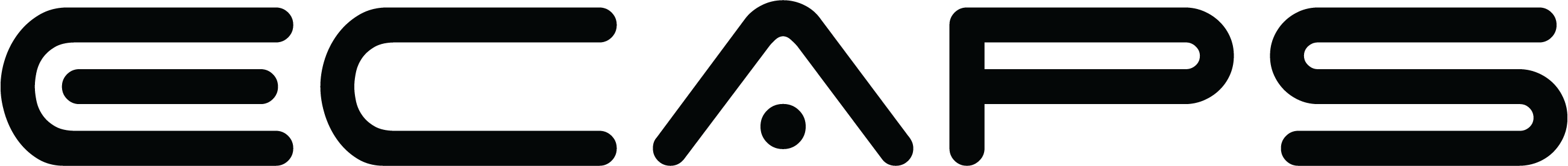
- Type: Private
- Industry: Aerospace, Defense, Energy Systems
- Founded: 2000
- Headquarters: Solna, Stockholm, Sweden
- Products: LMP-103S; HPGP Thrusters; HPGP Propulsion Systems; Gas Generators; Auxiliary and Emergency Power Systems
- Owner: Oak Universe AB
- Website: https://www.ecaps.se/

ECAPS AB is a Swedish aerospace and defense propulsion company recognized as a global pioneer in high-performance, low-toxicity monopropellant propulsion systems.

Founded in 2000, ECAPS introduced the High-Performance Green Propulsion (HPGP) concept and developed the LMP-103S propellant based on the Swedish-invented oxidizer Ammonium Dinitramide (ADN).

LMP-103S is recognized for its high performance and the hydrazine-level energy that it delivers, while offering lower operational costs thanks to its low toxicity. The propellant enables advanced space mobility capabilities, such as spacecraft maneuvering and orbital transfers, as well as dual-use power applications. Although ECAPS helped coin and popularize the term “green propulsion”, the focus of its innovation has always been enabling high-performance mobility and operational readiness.

Since its first in-orbit demonstration on the PRISMA mission (2010), ECAPS propulsion systems have flown on NASA, ESA, and commercial spacecraft, with expanding heritage across multiple mission classes.

In 2023, ECAPS was acquired by Oak Universe AB, a Swedish firm specializing in aerospace and defense technologies.

== History ==
=== Origins and Joint Venture (1997–2005) ===
The origins of ECAPS trace back to the late 1990s, when Swedish scientists initiated research into ADN as a high-energy yet environmentally safer oxidizer.

In 2000, ECAPS AB (Ecological Advanced Propulsion Systems) was established to continue the research around ADN. This reinforced experts' understanding on propellant chemistry and aerospace engineering, accelerating the industrialization of ADN technology.

In 2005, ECAPS started focusing on maturing the LMP-103S propellant and developing thruster families optimized for satellite applications.

=== First Demonstration and Flight Heritage ===
The company achieved a major milestone in 2010, when the PRISMA mission, operated by the Swedish National Space Agency (SNSA), successfully demonstrated ECAPS’s 1 N HPGP thruster in orbit - the first operational flight of an ADN-based propulsion system worldwide.

PRISMA validated both the performance and long-term stability of LMP-103S, establishing Sweden as the origin of the world’s first non-toxic spacecraft propulsion technology.

=== Commercial Expansion and Global Adoption (2013–2020) ===
Following PRISMA, ECAPS entered the commercial market with Skybox Imaging (later Planet Labs), supplying full propulsion systems for the SkySat Earth-observation constellation.

Between 2013 and 2020, ECAPS delivered 19 flight-qualified systems, demonstrating scalability, manufacturing repeatability, and operational reliability.

During this period, ECAPS propulsion modules also flew on NASA, ESA, and commercial demonstration programs, marking LMP-103S as one of the few green propellants with extensive on-orbit heritage.

=== Bradford Space Acquisition (2017–2023) ===
In 2017, ECAPS was acquired by Bradford Space Inc., under which serial production was exclusively scaled only for the 1 N thruster. During this time, ECAPS's support for missions was confined to small satellites.

=== Oak Universe Leadership (2023–present) ===
On 21 August 2023, ECAPS was acquired by Oak Universe AB, a Swedish investment firm focused on propulsion and manufacturing technologies. Following the acquisition, ECAPS expanded its development to include auxiliary power units (APUs), gas generators, and energy systems for the aerospace and defense sectors. This transition included an increased focus on dual-use technologies and domestic propulsion capabilities.

== Technology ==
=== High Performance Green Propulsion (HPGP) and LMP-103S ===
The LMP-103S propellant consists of approximately 63% ADN, 18% methanol, 14% water, and 5% ammonia.

With a density of 1.24 g/cm³, it delivers a specific impulse (Isp) of ~253 s, ~6 % higher than hydrazine.

Traditionally, hydrazine has been the leading propellant for spacecraft propulsion. Nevertheless, hydrazine is listed by the European Chemicals Agency (ECHA) as a Substance of Very High Concern (SVHC) under the European Union's REACH regulation due to its extreme environmental and health hazards.

Because of that, although temporary authorizations and exemptions exist, the European space sector is transitioning toward ADN-based alternatives such as LMP-103S to ensure regulatory compliance and reduce environmental and health risks. Its UN 1.4S classification allows safe transport under commercial air-cargo conditions, a major operational advantage.

This shift has been supported by ESA, SNSA, and European industry groups under the RHEFORM and HYPROGEO projects.

==== Handling and Range Demonstration ====
In 2015, ECAPS and NASA conducted the Green Propellant Loading Demonstration (GPLD) at U.S. launch ranges. The demonstration confirmed the safe handling and compatibility of LMP-103S with U.S. range standards.

==== Characteristics and Comparative Performance ====
LMP-103S delivers higher volumetric impulse and comparable I_{sp} to hydrazine with far reduced toxicity. AF-M315E (ASCENT) is another propellant that has demonstrated similar attributes, but has not been as tested and operationally proven. ECAPS’s 2024–2025 Fast-Start advance gives LMP-103S systems parity in responsiveness with traditional hydrazine thrusters.

Comparative Overview of Key Propellants
Propellant	Typical Vacuum I_{sp} (s)	Density (g/cm^{3})	Toxicity/Handling	Maturity/Heritage	Notes
LMP-103S (ADN-based)	~253 s	~1.24	Low-to-moderate toxicity, markedly less toxic than hydrazine. UN 1.4S transport classification (secure for transportation in commercial flights).	Flight-proven (PRISMA, SkySat, etc.). Tested through commercial and agency programs.	Strong volumetric impulse and growing heritage. Requires catalyst/ignition system (pre-heat historically needed). ECAPS Fast-Start catalyst technology reduces this).
Hydrazine	~228 - 236 s	~1.00	Carcinogenic and highly toxic (fatal in contact with skin or if inhaled). Stringent handling and personal protective equipment (SCAPE suits). Classified as a Substance of Very High Concern” (SVCH) under the EU’s REACH.	Longstanding flight heritage (widely used historically).	High maturity and many legacy systems, but growing regulatory and safety constraints.
AF-M315E / ASCENT	~230 - 260s (system dependent)	~1.14 - 1.70 Density advantage over hydrazine; density-Isp “improvement” widely reported.	Lower toxicity than hydrazine (designed as low-toxicity replacement).	Flight-tested in NASA GPIM. Active development (infusion efforts).	Offers large volumetric and performance gains in some system analyses; GPIM demonstrated flight operation of AF-M315E.
HTP (High Test Peroxide, H₂O₂)	~144s	~1.10 - 1.36 (depends on concentration; 90%+ HTP high density)	Low toxicity relative to hydrazine. Oxidizer hazard (concentrated).	Historic use in early rockets. Niche modern use; limited adoption compared to hydrazine.	Lower Isp vs hydrazine & ADN propellants but high density; useful where volumetric density and benign handling are priorities.
Nitrous-oxide (N₂O) monopropellant / NOMP (research)	Experimental; reported ranges ~120, 200s (varies by design)	~1.15 (gaseous at STP; in liquid/gaseous combinations density varies)	Moderate toxicity; non-toxic gas at low concentrations. Decomposition hazards. High combustion temperatures.	Currently in research / demonstrator stage (university/RAO, Stanford/JANNAF tests).	Attractive for low-complexity systems and gas-generation, but still largely experimental as a monopropellant.

=== Thruster Development and Product Range ===
ECAPS has developed a comprehensive range of ADN-based HPGP thrusters, covering thrust levels from one newton class attitude-control engines to several hundred newton main thrusters.

The company’s technology is based on its proprietary LMP-103S monopropellant, and all engines share a modular design philosophy, allowing common injector and catalyst configurations across multiple platforms.

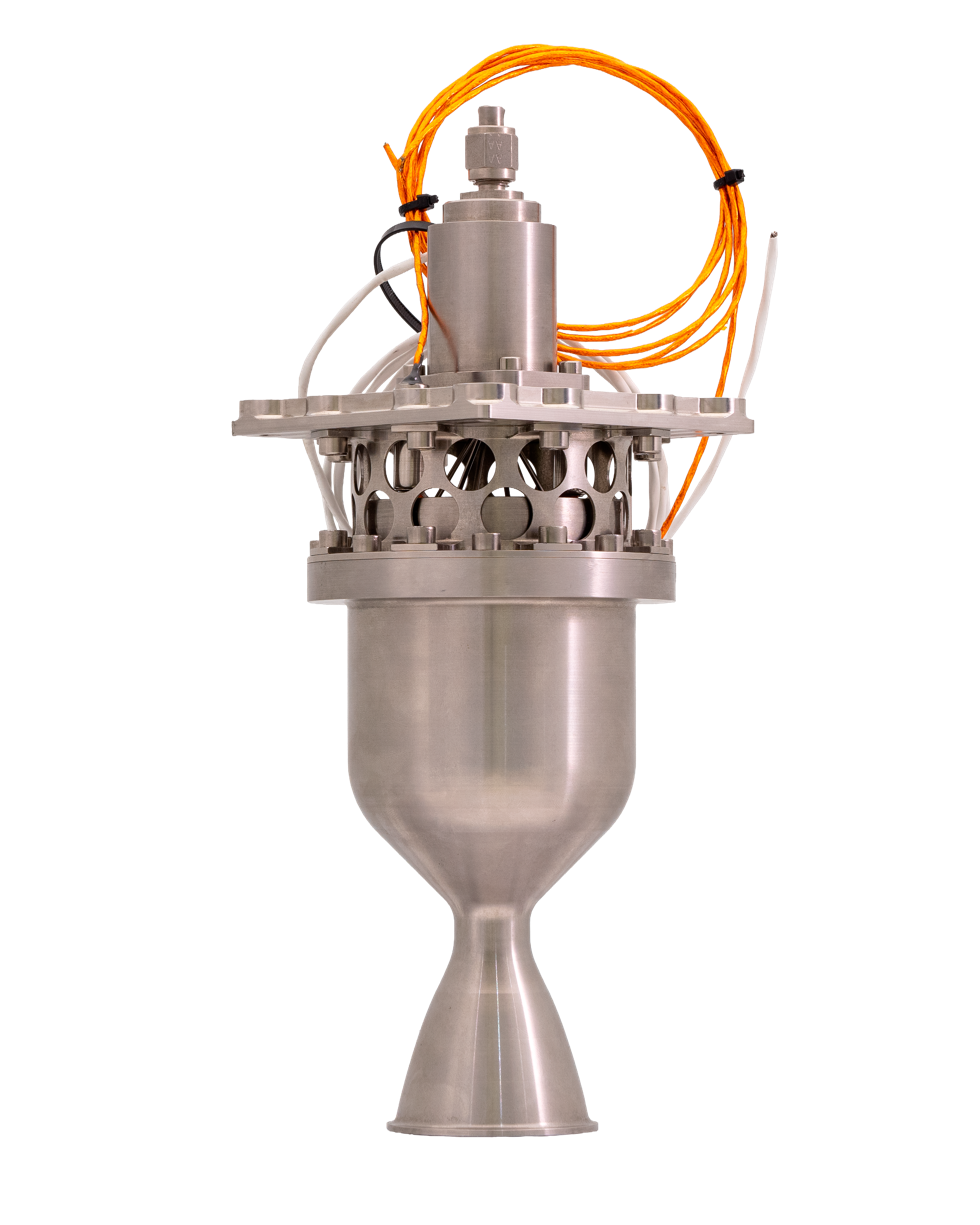
ECAPS's 200 N HPGP thruster.

The first generation of ECAPS thrusters was qualified through the PRISMA mission in 2010, which validated the 1 N HPGP design and established flight heritage for the technology.

Subsequent production models have been employed on commercial constellations such as SkySat and Astroscale’s ELSA-d spacecraft, as well as in ESA and NASA demonstration programs.

In the early 2010s, ECAPS also developed a 200 N ADN-based engine as part of the Ariane 5 rocket program in cooperation with ESA and CNES. That initiative demonstrated the scalability of ADN propulsion to high-thrust applications and remains a key milestone in Europe’s transition away from hydrazine.

The company has since expanded its product line to include 5 N and 22 N thrusters, with the latter serving as the basis for the FAST rapid-start demonstrations that took place in 2025.

Development efforts now extend toward 450 N and multi-kilonewton-class engines for orbital transfer vehicles and responsive-launch architectures, combining high performance with the operational benefits of low-toxicity monopropellants.

=== Gas Generators and Auxiliary Power Units (APUs) ===
Since the success of the PRISMA mission, ECAPS has been expanding the applications of LMP-103S to power HPGP propulsion for defense applications.

In 2012, NASA Marshall Space Flight Center collaborated with ECAPS to evaluate the application of ADN propellants for legacy aircraft Emergency Power Units (EPU) and gas generators. Tests using retired F-16 EPU hardware measured ignition reliability and turbine-drive performance on LMP-103S fuel, demonstrating feasibility as a low-toxicity replacement for hydrazine. Comparative analyses included the U-2 reconnaissance aircraft’s Emergency Start System (ESS), assessing energy-density and restart requirements for high-altitude use.

These studies highlighted LMP-103S’s potential for defense gas generator and APU integration.

Building on this research and innovation, ECAPS announced in July 2025 that it was developing an LMP-103S-powered APU. demonstrator in collaboration with ISE (International Submarine Engineering) to generate electrical and pneumatic power from a compact monopropellant core.

The APU program extends ADN technology from spacecraft propulsion to terrestrial and defense energy applications, leveraging fast start-up for instant activation and continuous operation. These applications include hypersonic, underwater, and aerial vehicles.

=== Catalyst and Fast-Start Ignition Development ===
Historically, ADN propellants have required long catalyst pre-heating times, up to 30 minutes.

Between 2024 and 2025, ECAPS achieved a major advance with its Fast-Start Thruster (FAST) Catalyst Technology, enabling instantaneous ignition and reducing preheating times by over 90%.

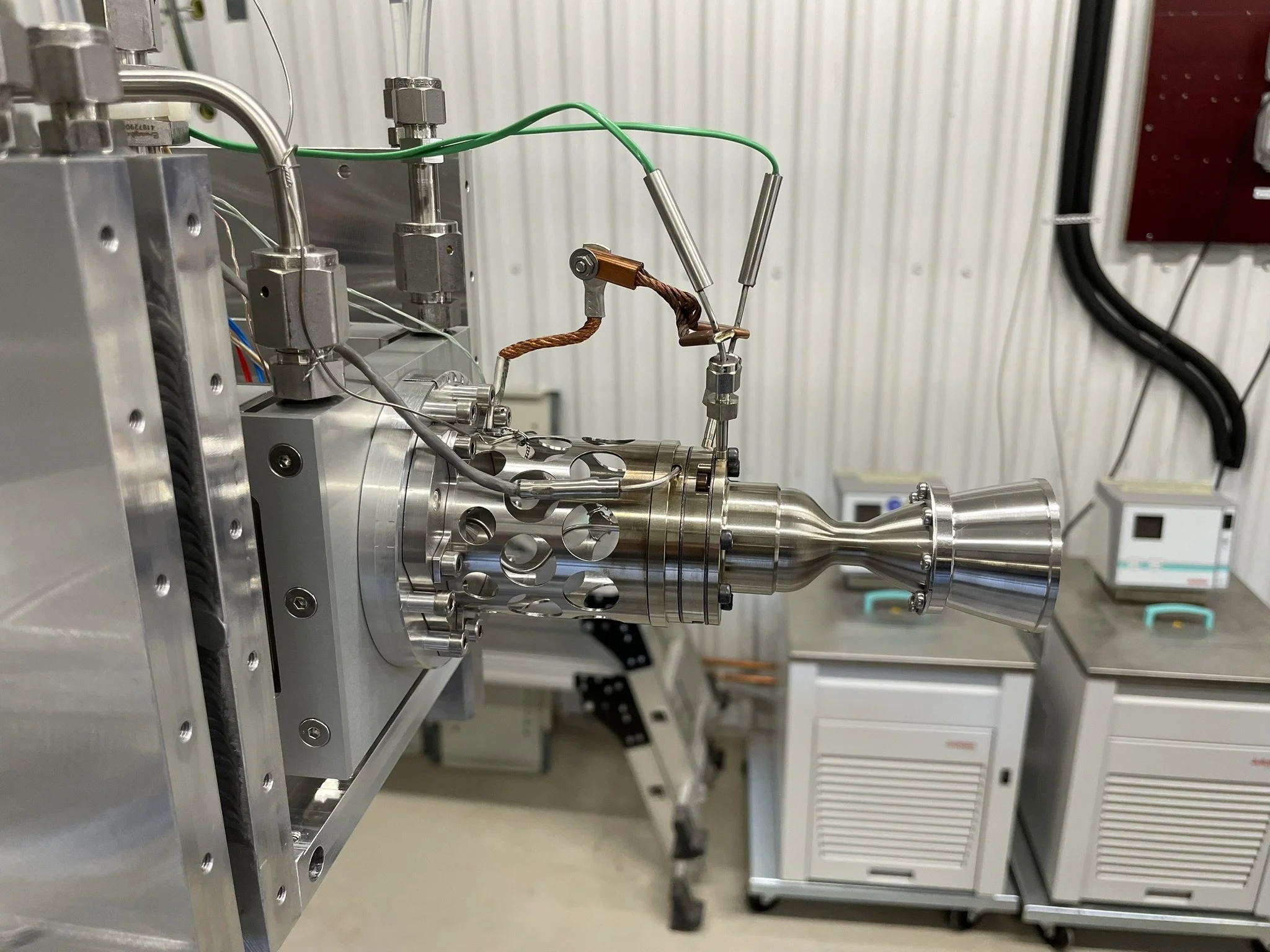
ECAPS's experimental 22 N thruster. In 2025, the thruster achieved stable combustion within 5-15s.

In September 2025, the SNSA awarded ECAPS a contract under Sweden’s Dual-Use Space Technology Program to integrate the Fast-Start capability into flight-class 22 N thrusters and gas-generator systems. The program demonstrated ignition in ~48 s with a roadmap toward achieving operational readiness in ~10s.

In parallel, ECAPS successfully demonstrated a 22 N FAST experimental thruster, achieving stable combustion within 5-15s of activation - a breakthrough validating the technology for higher-thrust applications and confirming repeatability through multiple restarts and thermal cycles.

These developments establish ECAPS’s Fast-Start technology as a core differentiator for rapid-response propulsion and energy systems.

Most Fast-Start development and testing occurred at ECAPS’s Solna facilities, which host catalyst-fabrication labs, high-temperature test benches, environmental chambers, and data-acquisition systems for ignition-cycle and durability testing.

== Heritage ==
Since its inaugural PRISMA flight, ECAPS’ HPGP technology has supported commercial and sovereign missions across Eurasia, Oceania, North America, and Southeast Asia. The following list indicates the non-classified missions that ECAPS technology has flown in.

Mission	Operators	Date, Time, Location	Launcher	Payloads with ECAPS technology	Applications
PRISMA	Swedish National Space Board; DLR (German Space Agency); CNES (French Space Agency)	15 June 2010, 14:42:16 UTC, Dombarovsky	Dnepr 15	Mango	Earth observation
SkySat C1	Planet Labs	22 June 2016, 03:56 UTC, Satish Dhawan Space Centre	PSLV-XL	SkySat 3	Earth observation
SkySat C2-C5	Planet Labs	16 September 2016, 01:43:35 UTC, Guiana Space Center	Vega	SkySat 4; SkySat 5; SkySat 6; SkySat 7	Earth observation
SkySat C6-C11	Planet Labs	31 October 2017, 21:37 UTC, Vandenberg Space Force Base	Minotaur-C	SkySat 8; SkySat 9; SkySat 10; SkySat 11; SkySat 12; SkySat 13	Earth observation
SkySat C12-C13 Space Test Program (STP)	Planet Labs Sierra Nevada Corporation	3 December 2018, 17:30:05 UTC, Vandenberg Space Force Base	Falcon 9	SkySat 14; SkySat 15; STPSat 5	Earth observation Defense applications
SkySat C14-C16	Planet Labs	13 June 2020, 09:21 UTC, Kennedy Space Center	Falcon 9	SkySat 16; SkySat 17; SkySat 18	Earth observation
SkySat C17-C19	Planet Labs	18 August 2020, 14:31:16 UTC, Kennedy Space Center	Falcon 9	SkySat 19; SkySat 20; SkySat 21	Earth observation
ELSA-d	Astroscale	22 March 2021, 6:08 UTC, Baikonur Cosmodrome	Soyuz	Servicer spacecraft	Debris removal
NROL-111	National Reconnaissance Office (NRO)	15 June 2021, 13:35 UTC, NASA Wallops Flight Facility	Minotaur 1	USA 316; USA 317; USA 318	Defense applications
Artemis I	NASA ASI (Italian Space Agency)	16 November 2022, 06:47:44 UTC, Kennedy Space Center	SLS	Argomoon	Imaging
ADRAS-J	Astroscale	18 February 2024, 14:52 UTC, Rocket Lab Launch Complex 1, Māhia, New Zealand	Electron KS	ADRAS-J	Debris removal
