= HPGP =

Rocket propellant

High Performance Green Propulsion (HPGP) is a rocket monopropellant developed as a safer alternative to hydrazine. HPGP is based on ammonium dinitramide mixed with ammonia and methanol. It can achieve a specific impulse of up to 255 seconds. The Prisma mission served as a demonstrator mission for HPGP. To date, a dozen spacecraft equipment with HPGP thrusters have been launched to space, including the Planet (formerly Skybox Imaging) SkySat spacecraft.

HPGP is also planned to be used on the Lunar Flashlight and ArgoMoon missions to the Moon, on Astroscale space debris removal spacecraft, on the U.S. Air Force's STPSat-5 technology demonstrator spacecraft and on the Astranis microGEO bus.
