= Monopropellant rocket =

Rocket that uses a single propellant with a catalyst

A monopropellant rocket (or "monochemical rocket") is a rocket that uses a single chemical as its propellant. Monopropellant rockets are commonly used as small attitude and trajectory control rockets in satellites, rocket upper stages, crewed spacecraft, and spaceplanes.

== Chemical-reaction based ==
The simplest monopropellant rockets depend on the chemical decomposition of a storable propellant after passing it over a catalyst bed. The power for the thruster comes from the high pressure gas created during the decomposition reaction that allows a rocket nozzle to speed up the gas to create thrust.

=== Hydrazine ===
The most commonly used monopropellant is hydrazine (N_{2}H_{4}, or H_{2}N−NH_{2}), a compound unstable in the presence of a catalyst and which is also a strong reducing agent. The decomposition is highly exothermic and produces a 1,000 °C (1,830 °F) gas that is a mixture of nitrogen, hydrogen and ammonia according to the three following reactions:

Reaction 1: N_{2}H_{4} → N_{2} + 2 H_{2}
Reaction 2: 3 N_{2}H_{4} → 4 NH_{3} + N_{2}
Reaction 3: 4 NH_{3} + N_{2}H_{4} → 3 N_{2} + 8 H_{2}

The most common catalyst is granular alumina (aluminum oxide, Al_{2}O_{3}) coated with iridium. These coated granules are usually under the commercial labels Aerojet S-405 (previously made by Shell) or W.C. Heraeus H-KC 12 GA (previously made by Kali Chemie). There is no igniter with hydrazine. Aerojet S-405 is a spontaneous catalyst, that is, hydrazine decomposes on contact with the catalyst.

The main limiting factor of the monopropellant rocket is its life, which mainly depends on the life of the catalyst. The catalyst may be subject to catalytic poisoning and catalytic attrition which results in the catalyst failure.

=== Hydrogen peroxide ===
Another monopropellant is hydrogen peroxide, which, when purified to 90% or higher concentration, is self-decomposing at high temperatures or when a catalyst is present.

=== In general ===
Most chemical-reaction monopropellant rocket systems consist of a fuel tank, usually a titanium or aluminium sphere, with an ethylene-propylene rubber container or a surface tension propellant management device filled with the fuel. The tank is then pressurized with helium or nitrogen, which pushes the fuel out to the motors. A pipe leads from the tank to a poppet valve, and then to the decomposition chamber of the rocket motor. Typically, a satellite will have not just one motor, but two to twelve, each with its own valve.

The attitude control rocket motors for satellites and space probes are often very small, 25 mm (0.98 in) or so in diameter, and mounted in groups that point in four directions (within a plane).

The rocket is fired when the computer sends direct current through a small electromagnet that opens the poppet valve. The firing is often very brief, a few milliseconds, and — if operated in air — would sound like a pebble thrown against a metal trash can; if on for long, it would make a piercing hiss.

Chemical-reaction monopropellants are not as efficient as some other propulsion technologies. Engineers choose monopropellant systems when the need for simplicity and reliability outweigh the need for high delivered impulse. If the propulsion system must produce large amounts of thrust, or have a high specific impulse, as on the main motor of an interplanetary spacecraft, other technologies are used.

== Solar-thermal based ==
A concept to provide low Earth orbit (LEO) propellant depots that could be used as way-stations for other spacecraft to stop and refuel on the way to beyond-LEO missions has proposed that waste gaseous hydrogen—an inevitable byproduct of long-term liquid hydrogen storage in the radiative heat environment of space—would be usable as a monopropellant in a solar-thermal propulsion system. The waste hydrogen would be productively utilized for both orbital station-keeping and attitude control, as well as providing limited propellant and thrust to use for orbital maneuvers to better rendezvous with other spacecraft that would be inbound to receive fuel from the depot.

Solar-thermal monopropellant thrusters are also integral to the design of a next-generation cryogenic upper stage rocket proposed by U.S. company United Launch Alliance (ULA). The Advanced Common Evolved Stage (ACES) is intended as a lower-cost, more-capable and more-flexible upper stage that would supplement, and perhaps replace, the existing ULA Centaur and ULA Delta Cryogenic Second Stage (DCSS) upper stage vehicles. The ACES Integrated Vehicle Fluids option eliminates all hydrazine and helium from the space vehicle—normally used for attitude control and station keeping—and depends instead on solar-thermal monopropellant thrusters using waste hydrogen.

== History ==
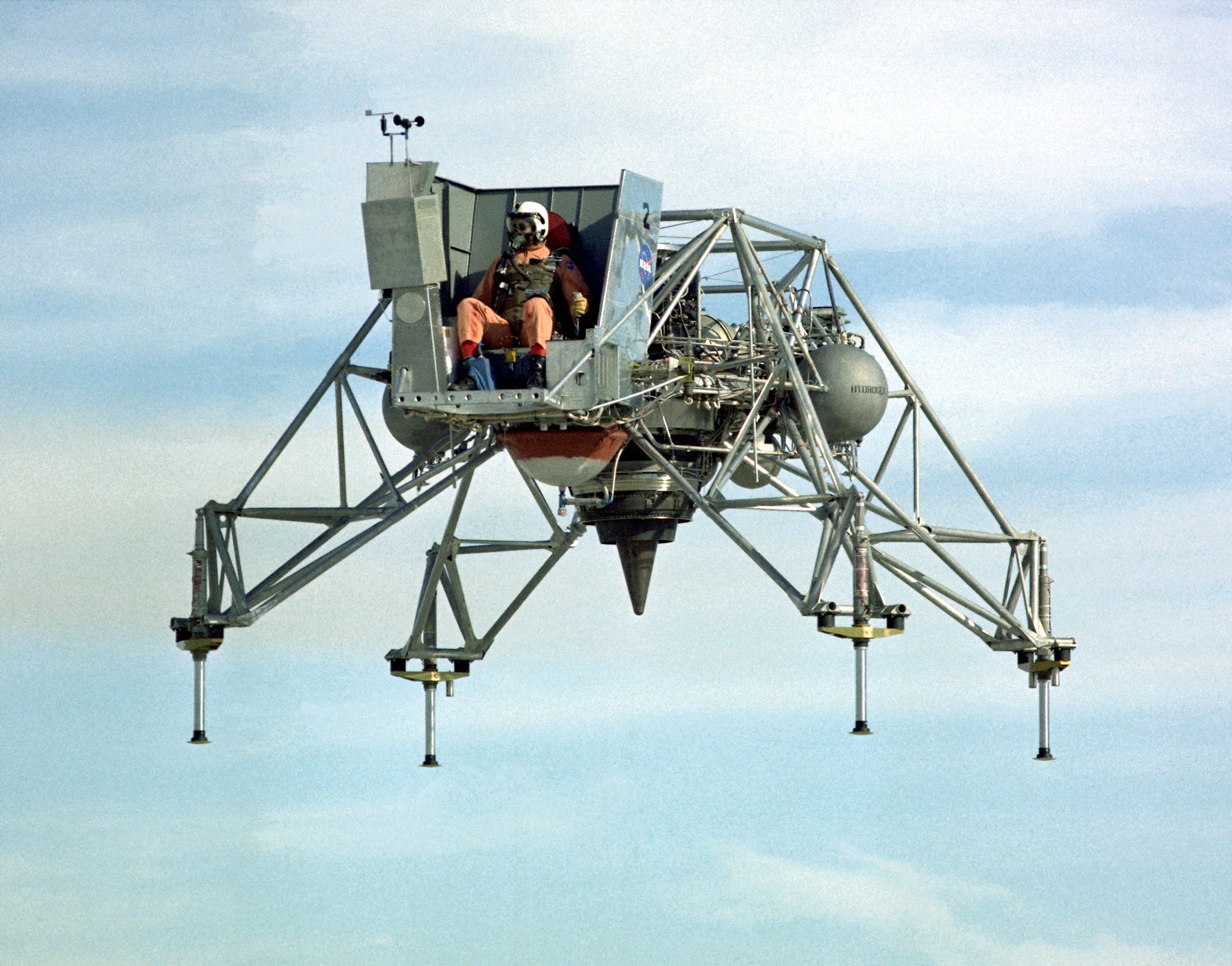
Lunar Landing Research Vehicle with 18 Hydrogen Peroxide Monopropellant Thrusters

Soviet designers had begun experimenting with monopropellant rockets as early as 1933. They believed their monopropellant mixes of nitrogen tetroxide with gasoline, or toluene, and kerosene would lead to an overall simpler system; however, they ran into problems with violent explosions with pre-mixed fuel and oxidizer serving as a monopropellant that led the designers to abandon this approach.

German engineer Helmuth Walter was an early pioneer of monopropellant rockets using hydrogen peroxide as fuel. Initially developing a peroxide gas turbine for use in submarines, monopropellant motors of his design were used to power the Heinkel He 176 (the first aircraft solely powered by a liquid rocket motor) and early Messerschmitt Me 163 Komet prototypes (the only operational rocket-powered fighter).

After World War II the British continued to experiment with hydrogen peroxide monopropellants. They developed the de Havilland Sprite, a motor that could produce 5000lbf (22.2 kN) of thrust over 16 seconds. This rocket was tested on 30 flights on the de Havilland Comet 1 (the first commercial jet airliner) in an effort to boost hot and high takeoff performance, but was never used operationally.

In the United States, when NASA began studying monopropellants at the Jet Propulsion Laboratory (JPL) the properties of the existing propellants demanded that the thrusters be impractically large. The addition of a catalyst and pre-heating propellant made them more efficient, but raised concerns over safety and handling of hazardous propellants like anhydrous hydrazine. However the simplicity of the thrusters designed around early monopropellants offered many simplicities and were first tested in 1959 on the Able-4 mission. This test allowed for the Ranger and Mariner missions to use a similar thruster for correction maneuvers and in the orbital insertion of Telstar, considered by the National Air and Space Museum to be the most significant communications satellite in the beginning of the space race.

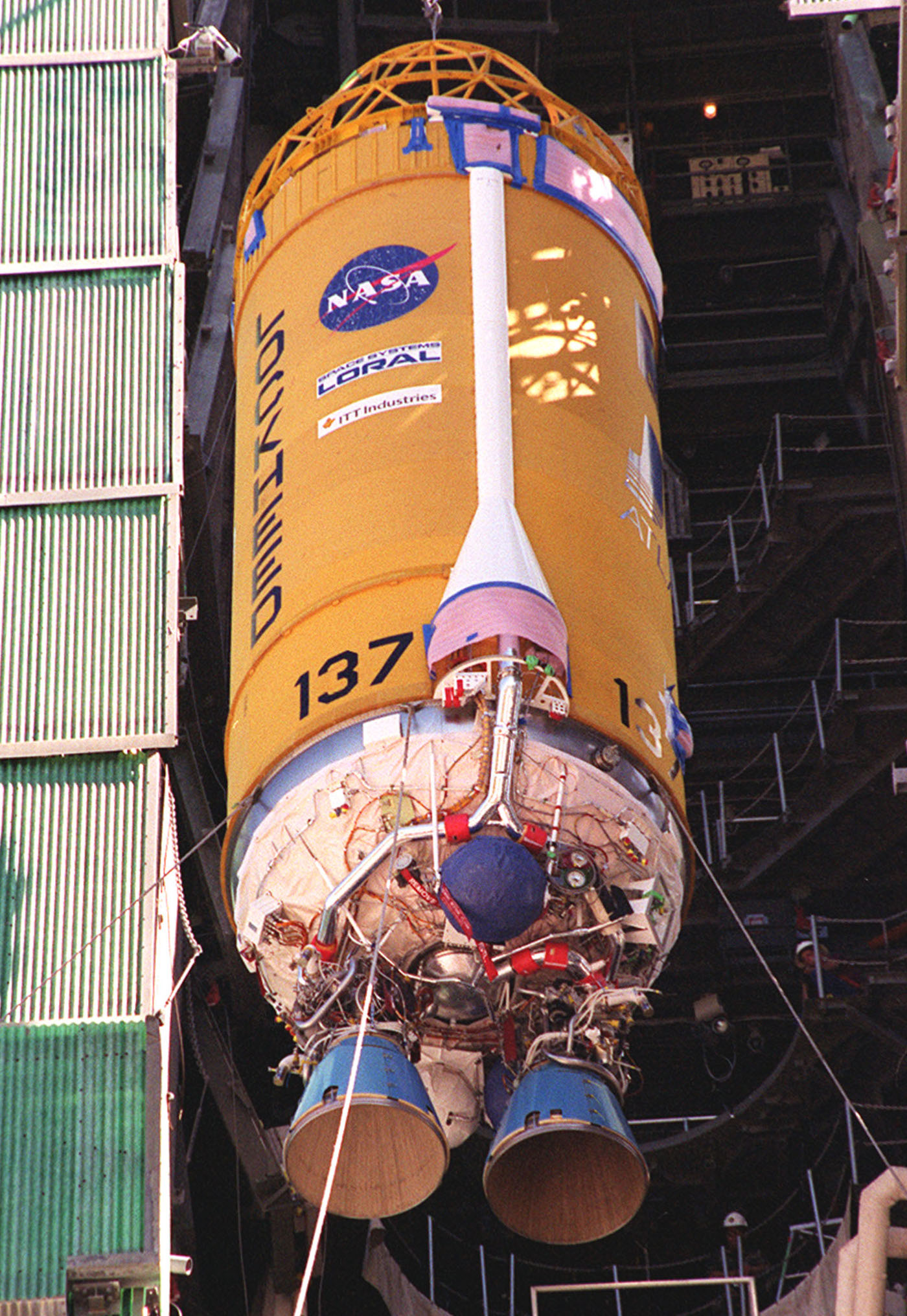
Centaur III Upper Stage with 12 Hydrazine Monopropellant Thrusters

In 1964, NASA began use of the Lunar Landing Research Vehicle to train Apollo astronauts in piloting the Lunar Excursion Module (LEM) using an attitude control system consisting of 16 hydrogen peroxide monopropellant thrusters to steer the LEM to the lunar surface.

Upper stage vehicles began using monopropellant thrusters as a convenient control device in the early 1960s when General Dynamics proposed the Centaur upper stage to the United States Airforce of which versions are still in use in United Launch Alliance's Atlas and Vulcan rockets.

== New developments ==
NASA is developing a new monopropellant propulsion system for small, cost-driven spacecraft with delta-v requirements in the range of 10–150 m/s. This system is based on a hydroxylammonium nitrate (HAN)/water/fuel monopropellant blend which is extremely dense, environmentally benign, and promises good performance and simplicity.

The EURENCO Bofors company produced LMP-103S as a 1-to-1 substitute for hydrazine by dissolving 65% ammonium dinitramide, NH_{4}N(NO_{2})_{2}, in 35% water solution of methanol and ammonia. LMP-103S has 6% higher specific impulse and 30% higher impulse density than hydrazine monopropellant. Additionally, hydrazine is highly toxic and carcinogenic, while LMP-103S is only moderately toxic. LMP-103S is UN Class 1.4S allowing for transport on commercial aircraft, and was demonstrated on the Prisma satellite in 2010. Special handling is not required. LMP-103S could replace hydrazine as the most commonly used monopropellant.

== See also ==
- Monopropellant
- Hypergolic propellant
- Liquid-propellant rocket
- Mars Reconnaissance Orbiter
- Reaction wheel
- Nitrous oxide fuel blend
- Rocket propulsion technologies (disambiguation)
