= Otto fuel II =

Torpedo fuel

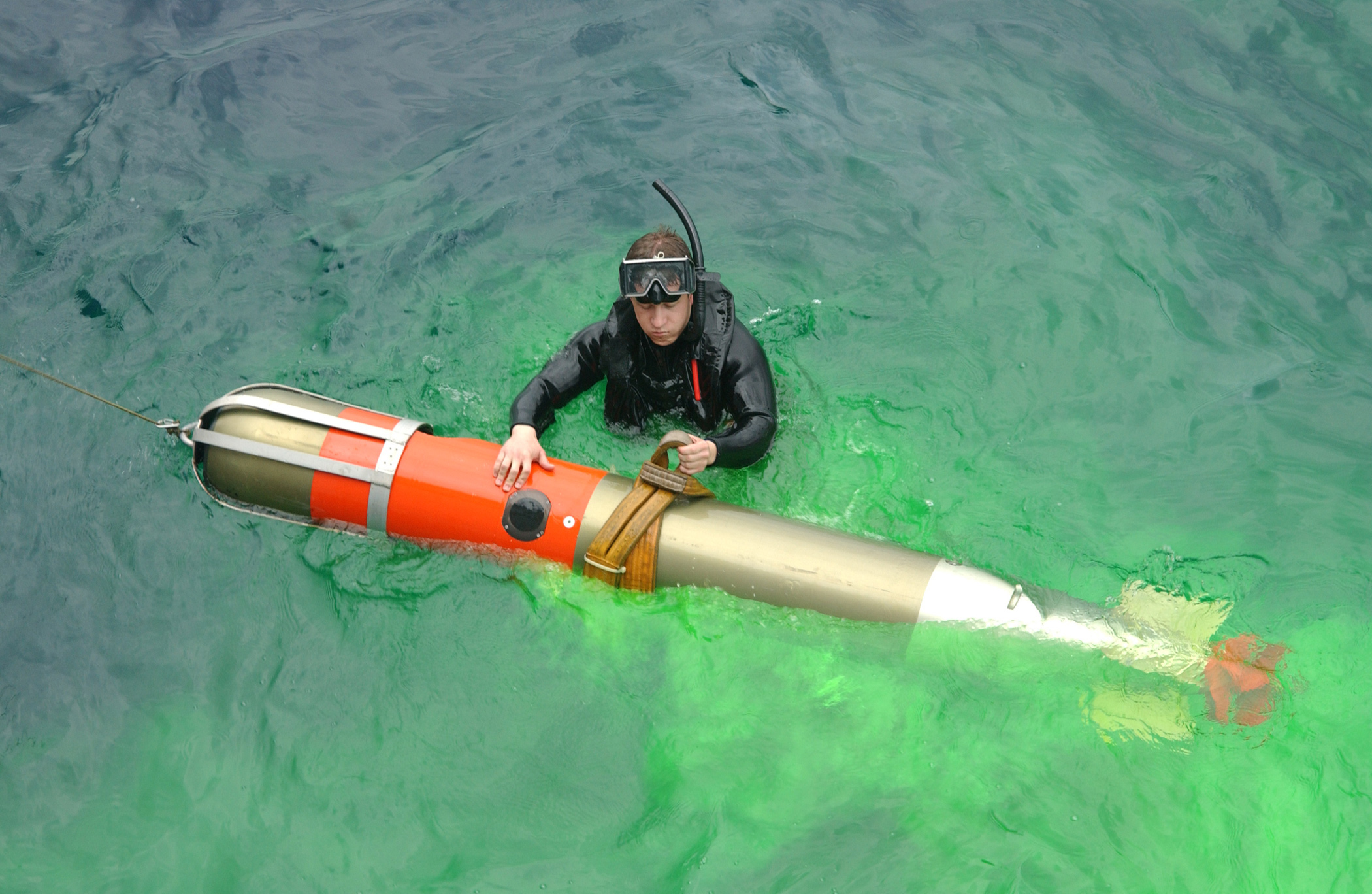
Mk 46 torpedo, which uses Otto fuel II

Otto fuel II is a monopropellant mixture of chiefly propylene glycol dinitrate (an ester of nitric acid and propylene glycol, and structurally similar to nitroglycerin) that is used to drive torpedoes and other weapon systems. It was invented by Otto Reitlinger in 1963 (although tests with the substance had taken place before, for example in 1960). Otto fuel II, sometimes known simply as Otto fuel, is not related to the Otto cycle; it is named after Reitlinger and for being the second iteration of the fuel.

== Properties ==
Otto fuel II is a distinct-smelling (described by submariners as being similar in smell to wintergreen oil; i.e. sweet, fruity and minty), reddish-orange, oily liquid that is a mixture of three synthetic substances: propylene glycol dinitrate (the major component), 2-nitrodiphenylamine, and dibutyl sebacate. It does not need exposure to any oxidant to ignite and release energy, as its three components will react among themselves whenever vaporised and heated. Needing no oxidants and being a stable substance makes Otto fuel II ideal for use in the constrained environment of a submarine. Although the fuel can be made to explode, this requires such extreme conditions that it can be regarded as practically stable. The vapour pressure of the fuel is low (i.e., it is not volatile), minimizing toxic hazards. Finally, the fuel's energy density far surpasses the capacity of the electric battery used in other torpedoes, maximizing range.

== Major ingredients ==
Named after its inventor, Otto Reitlinger, Otto fuel II consists of the nitrated ester explosive propellant propylene glycol dinitrate (PGDN), to which a desensitizer (dibutyl sebacate) and a stabilizer (2-nitrodiphenylamine) have been added. The chief component, propylene glycol dinitrate, accounts for approximately 76% of the mixture, while dibutyl sebacate and 2-nitrodiphenylamine account for approximately 22.5% and 1.5% (by weight), respectively.

The principal current use of propylene glycol dinitrate is as a propellant in Otto fuel II. Nitrates of polyhydric alcohols such as this have been used in medicine for the treatment of angina pectoris, and as explosives since the mid-nineteenth century.

In addition to its use by the United States Navy as a stabilizer in the manufacture of Otto fuel II, 2-nitrodiphenylamine is employed for similar purposes by the United States Army in the manufacture of double base solid propellants. It also has civilian applications as a solvent dye.

== Toxicity ==
Otto fuel II is a toxic substance found in EPA National Priorities List. Ingestion of contaminated food or direct exposure at worksites can cause headaches, poor eye–hand coordination, eye irritation, congested noses, nausea, dizziness, and difficulty breathing. An MSA Demand Mask is mandatory for cleanup/mitigation efforts.

== Used in ==
- Mark 37 torpedo (With speed-up kit)
- Mark 48 torpedo
- Mark 46 torpedo
- Mark 54 torpedo
- Spearfish torpedo (with oxidizer)
- Yu-6 torpedo
- Futlyar
