= Nitrous oxide (disambiguation) =

Nitrous oxide is a colorless, non-flammable gas, commonly known as laughing gas.

Nitrous oxide may also refer to:

- Nitrous oxide (medication)
- Nitrous oxide fuel blend, a class of liquid rocket propellants
- N2O: Nitrous Oxide, a video game

== See also ==
- Nitros Oxide, character in Crash Bandicoot
- Nitrous oxide engine, an internal combustion engine
