= C17H20N2O =

The molecular formula C_{17}H_{20}N_{2}O (molar mass: 268.35 g/mol, exact mass: 268.1576 u) may refer to:

- Centralite, or ethyl centralite
- Michler's ketone
- Remacemide
