= Propylene glycol dinitrate =

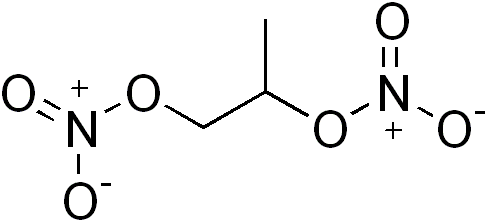

Names
- IUPAC name Propylene dinitrate
- Other names Propane-1,2-diyl dinitrate; 1,2-Bis(nitrooxy)propane

Identifiers
CAS Number	6423-43-4
3D model (JSmol)	Interactive image
ChEMBL	ChEMBL206527
ChemSpider	21472
ECHA InfoCard	100.026.527
PubChem CID	22933
UNII	4BY6T6Y8D1
CompTox Dashboard (EPA)	DTXSID7027627
- InChI: InChI=1S/C3H6N2O6/c1-3(11-5(8)9)2-10-4(6)7/h3H,2H2,1H3 Key: PSXCGTLGGVDWFU-UHFFFAOYSA-N; InChI=1/C3H6N2O6/c1-3(11-5(8)9)2-10-4(6)7/h3H,2H2,1H3 Key: PSXCGTLGGVDWFU-UHFFFAOYAG
- SMILES: O=[N+]([O-])OC(C)CO[N+](=O)[O-]

Properties
Chemical formula	C_{3}H_{6}N_{2}O_{6}
Molar mass	166.089 g·mol^{−1}
Appearance	colorless liquid
Odor	disagreeable
Density	1.232 g/cm^{3} (at 20 °C)
Melting point	−27.7 °C (−17.9 °F; 245.5 K)
Boiling point	121 °C (250 °F; 394 K) (decomposes below boiling point)
Solubility in water	0.1% (20°C)
Vapor pressure	0.07 mmHg (22°C)

Hazards
- Lethal dose or concentration (LD, LC)
LD_{50} (median dose)	930 mg kg^{−1} (IP, rat)
- NIOSH (US health exposure limits)
PEL (Permissible)	none
REL (Recommended)	TWA 0.05 ppm (0.3 mg/m^{3}) [skin]
IDLH (Immediate danger)	N.D.
- Except where otherwise noted, data are given for materials in their standard state (at 25 °C [77 °F], 100 kPa). verify (what is ?) Infobox references

Propylene glycol dinitrate (PGDN, 1,2-propylene glycol dinitrate, or 1,2-propanediol dinitrate) is an organic chemical, an ester of nitric acid and propylene glycol. It is structurally similar to nitroglycerin, except that it has one fewer nitrate group. It is a characteristically and unpleasantly smelling colorless liquid, which decomposes at 121 °C, below its boiling point. It is flammable and explosive. It is shock-sensitive and burns with a clean flame producing water vapor, carbon monoxide, and nitrogen gas.

C_{3}H_{6}(ONO_{2})_{2} → 3 CO + 3 H_{2}O + N_{2}

The principal current use of propylene glycol dinitrate is as a propellant in Otto Fuel II, together with 2-nitrodiphenylamine and dibutyl sebacate. Otto Fuel II is used in some torpedoes as a propellant.

Nitrates of polyhydric alcohols, of which propylene glycol dinitrate is an example, have been used in medicine for the treatment of angina pectoris, and as explosives since the mid-nineteenth century.

PGDN affects blood pressure, causes respiratory toxicity, damages liver and kidneys, distorts vision, causes methoglobinuria, and can cause headache and lack of coordination. It may be absorbed through skin. Its primary toxicity mechanism is methemoglobinemia. It may cause permanent nerve damage.

For occupational exposures, the National Institute for Occupational Safety and Health has set a recommended exposure limit at 0.05 ppm (0.3 mg/m^{3}) over an eight-hour workday, for dermal exposures.
