= Diethyl sebacate =

Names
- IUPAC name Diethyl decanedioate
- Other names: 1,10-diethyl decanedioate; Decanedioic acid diethyl ester; Diethyl 1,8-octanedicarboxylate; Diethyl 1,10-decanedioate; Ethyl sebacate

Identifiers
CAS Number	110-40-7
3D model (JSmol)	Interactive image
ChEBI	CHEBI:172099
ChEMBL	ChEMBL1884461
ChemSpider	7758
ECHA InfoCard	100.003.423
EC Number	203-764-5
KEGG	D10682
PubChem CID	8049
UNII	I41B9FJK6V
CompTox Dashboard (EPA)	DTXSID0021915
- InChI: InChI=1S/C14H26O4/c1-3-17-13(15)11-9-7-5-6-8-10-12-14(16)18-4-2/h3-12H2,1-2H3 Key: ONKUXPIBXRRIDU-UHFFFAOYSA-N
- SMILES: CCOC(=O)CCCCCCCCC(=O)OCC

Properties
Chemical formula	C_{14}H_{26}O_{4}
Molar mass	258.358 g·mol^{−1}
Appearance	colorless oil
Density	0.963 g/cm^{3}
Melting point	5 °C (41 °F; 278 K)
Boiling point	312 °C (594 °F; 585 K)
Solubility in water	0.08 mg/mL (20 °C)
Solubility	miscible in alcohol, ether, other organic solvents, most fixed oils
Refractive index (n_{D})	1.434-1.440

Hazards
- GHS labelling
Pictograms	(GHS09: Environmental hazard)
Hazard statements	H411
Precautionary statements	P273, P391, P501
- Except where otherwise noted, data are given for materials in their standard state (at 25 °C [77 °F], 100 kPa). Infobox references

Diethyl sebacate is the organic compound with the formula (CH_{3}CH_{2}O_{2}C(CH_{2})_{4})_{2}. It is the diethyl ester of sebacic acid. A colorless oil, it is a precursor to other oganic compounds, e.g. reduction to 1,10-decanediol.

== Related compounds ==
A variety of longer chain esters of sebacic are used as plasticizers, e.g. dibutyl sebacate.
