= Green Propellant Infusion Mission =

NASA satellite testing a new rocket fuel

Green Propellant Infusion Mission (GPIM)
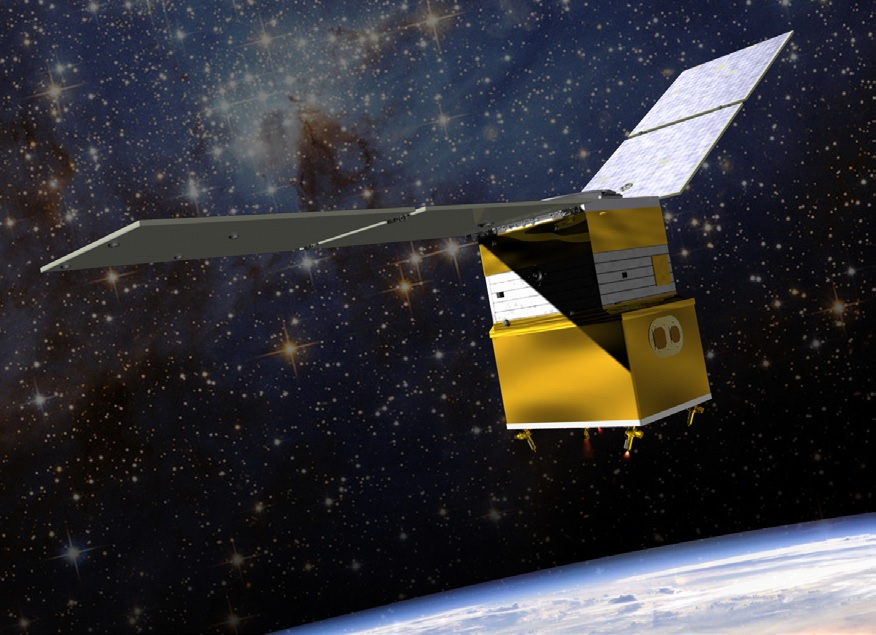
- Artist's rendering of GPIM on Earth orbit
- Mission type: Technology demonstrator
- Operator: NASA
- COSPAR ID: 2019-036D
- SATCAT no.: 44342
- Website: www.ball.com/aerospace/programs/gpim
- Mission duration: Planned: 14 months Final: 1 year, 3 months, 19 days

Spacecraft properties
- Bus: BCP-100
- Manufacturer: Ball Aerospace
- Dry mass: 158 kg (348 lb)

Start of mission
- Launch date: 25 June 2019, 06:30 UTC
- Rocket: Falcon Heavy
- Launch site: Kennedy Space Center, LC-39A
- Contractor: SpaceX

End of mission
- Disposal: Deorbited
- Decay date: 14 October 2020

Orbital parameters
- Reference system: Geocentric orbit
- Regime: Low Earth orbit
- Perigee altitude: 710 km (440 mi)
- Apogee altitude: 724 km (450 mi)
- Inclination: 24.0°

The Green Propellant Infusion Mission (GPIM) was a NASA technology demonstrator project that tested a less toxic and higher performance/efficiency chemical propellant for next-generation launch vehicles and CubeSat spacecraft. When compared to the present high-thrust and high-performance industry standard for orbital maneuvering systems, which for decades, have exclusively been reliant upon toxic hydrazine based propellant formulations, the "greener" hydroxylammonium nitrate (HAN) monopropellant offers many advantages for future satellites, including longer mission durations, additional maneuverability, increased payload space and simplified launch processing. The GPIM was managed by NASA's Marshall Space Flight Center in Huntsville, Alabama, and was part of NASA's Technology Demonstration Mission Program within the Space Technology Mission Directorate.

The Green Propellant Infusion Mission launched aboard a SpaceX Falcon Heavy rocket on 25 June 2019, on a test mission called Space Test Program 2 (STP-2). The cost of the program was projected to be US$45 million.

== Development ==
=== Propellant ===
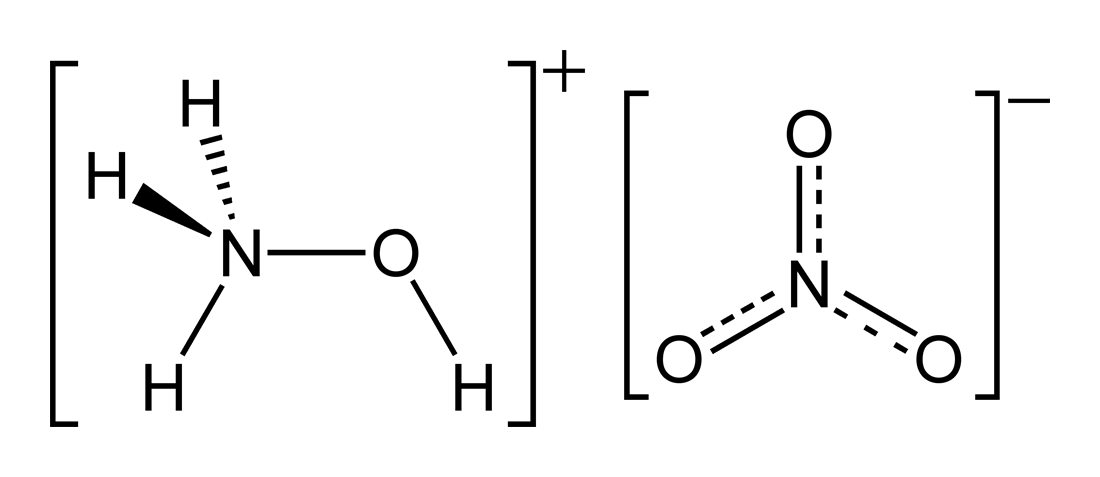
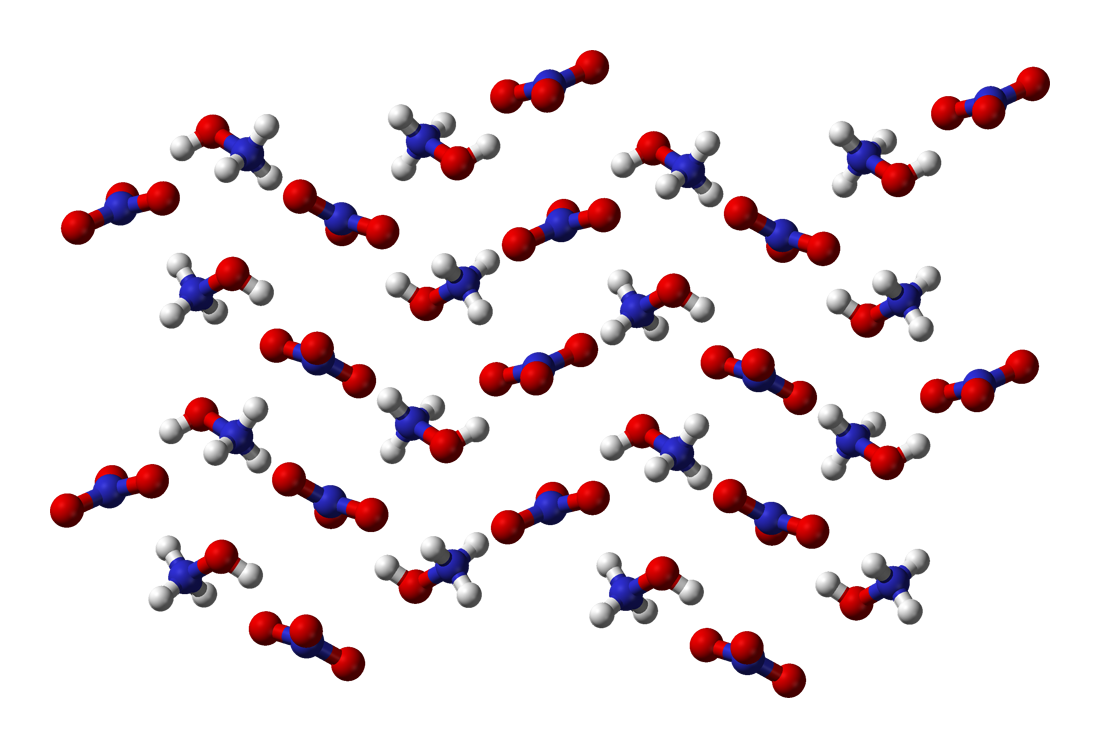
Hydroxylammonium nitrate molecule (NH_{3}OHNO_{3}) is a dense energetic ionic liquid

The propellant for this mission is hydroxylammonium nitrate (NH_{3}OHNO_{3}) fuel/oxidizer blend, also known as AF-M315E. Preliminary data indicates that it offers nearly 50% higher performance for a given propellant tank volume compared to a conventional monopropellant hydrazine system. The Green Propellant Infusion Mission sought to improve overall propellant efficiency while reducing the toxic handling concerns associated with the highly toxic propellant hydrazine. The new propellant is an energetic ionic liquid. Ionic liquids are salt compounds in a liquid form whose molecules have either a positive or negative charge, which bonds them together more tightly and makes the liquid more stable.

This new propellant is also expected to be significantly less harmful to the environment. It is called a "green" fuel because when combusted, AF-M315E transforms into nontoxic gasses. The AF-M315E propellant, nozzles and valves are being developed by the Air Force Research Laboratory (AFRL), Aerojet Rocketdyne, and Glenn Research Center, with additional mission support from the USAF Space and Missile Systems Center and NASA's Kennedy Space Center. The Air Force licensed AF-M315E production to Digital Solid State Propulsion (DSSP) to supply the propellant to government and commercial customers.

Following the success of GPIM, the AF-M315E propellent was renamed ASCENT (Advanced Spacecraft Energetic Non-Toxic) in preparation for commercial use and production.

=== Satellite ===
The GPIM system flew aboard the small Ball Configurable Platform 100 (BCP-100) spacecraft bus. Aerojet Rocketdyne was responsible for the development of the propulsion system payload, and the technology demonstration mission employed an Aerojet-developed advanced monopropellant payload module as the sole means of on-board propulsion.

=== Scientific payload ===
The Defense Department's Space Experiments Review board selected three payloads to be hosted aboard GPIM:

- An Air Force Academy instrument to characterize Earth's ionosphere and thermosphere.
- A Naval Research Laboratory instrument to measure plasma densities and temperatures.
- An Air Force Institute of Technology instrument that will test space collision avoidance measures. Over the course of its mission, GPIM uses these instruments to monitor space weather and continuously track its own position and velocity.

== Applications ==
Once proven in flight, the project presents AF-M315E/ASCENT propellant and compatible tanks, valves and thrusters to NASA and the commercial spaceflight industry as "a viable, effective solution for future green propellant-based mission applications". According to NASA, the new propellant will be an enabling technology for commercial spaceports operating across the United States "permitting safer, faster and much less costly launch vehicle and spacecraft fuel loading operations." The combined benefits of low toxicity and easy open-container handling shorten ground processing time from weeks to days, simplifying the launching of satellites. The new fuel is 50% denser than hydrazine, meaning more of it can be stored in containers of the same volume. It also has a lower freezing point, requiring less spacecraft power to maintain its temperature.

In addition to its use on lighter satellites and rockets, the fuel's exceptional volumetric storage properties is also being assessed for military uses such as missile launches.

== See also ==
- 2-Dimethylaminoethylazide
- ALICE (propellant)
- Crawford burner
- Green Propellant Reaction Control System
- Ion thruster
- List of Stoffs
- Nitrous oxide fuel blend
- Nuclear propulsion
- Project Morpheus
- Timeline of hydrogen technologies
- Trinitramide
