= Dibutyl sebacate =

Names
- Preferred IUPAC name Dibutyl decanedioate
- Other names dibutyl sebacate, Proviplast 1944lkl;

Identifiers
CAS Number	109-43-3
3D model (JSmol)	Interactive image
ChEMBL	ChEMBL2106225
ChemSpider	7697
ECHA InfoCard	100.003.339
EC Number	203-672-5
PubChem CID	7986
RTECS number	VS1150000
UNII	4W5IH7FLNY
CompTox Dashboard (EPA)	DTXSID1041847
- InChI: InChI=1S/C18H34O4/c1-3-5-15-21-17(19)13-11-9-7-8-10-12-14-18(20)22-16-6-4-2/h3-16H2,1-2H3 Key: PYGXAGIECVVIOZ-UHFFFAOYSA-N
- SMILES: CCCCOC(=O)CCCCCCCCC(=O)OCCCC

Properties
Chemical formula	C_{18}H_{34}O_{4}
Molar mass	314.466 g·mol^{−1}
Appearance	colorless liquid
Density	0.9405 g/cm^{3} at 15 °C
Melting point	−10 °C (14 °F; 263 K)
Boiling point	344.5 °C (652.1 °F; 617.6 K)
Solubility in water	0.04 g/L
Solubility	soluble in diethyl ether, carbon tetrachloride

Structure
Dipole moment	2.48 D

Thermochemistry
Heat capacity (C)	1.968 J·g^{−1}·K^{−1}

Hazards
- GHS labelling
Pictograms	(GHS07: Exclamation mark)
Signal word	Warning
Hazard statements	H315, H319, H335
Precautionary statements	P261, P264, P271, P280, P302+P352, P304+P340, P305+P351+P338, P312, P321, P332+P313, P337+P313, P362, P403+P233, P405, P501
Flash point	178 °C (352 °F; 451 K)
Autoignition temperature	365 °C (689 °F; 638 K)
Explosive limits	>0.4%
- Except where otherwise noted, data are given for materials in their standard state (at 25 °C [77 °F], 100 kPa). verify (what is ?) Infobox references

Dibutyl sebacate (DBS) is an organic compound with the formula (CH_{3}CH_{2}CH_{2}CH_{2}O_{2}CCH_{2}CH_{2}CH_{2}CH_{2})_{2}. It is the dibutyl ester of sebacic acid. Its main use is as a plasticizer in production of plastics, namely cellulose acetate butyrate, cellulose acetate propionate, ethyl cellulose, polyvinyl butyral, polyvinyl chloride, polystyrene, and many synthetic rubbers (especially nitrile rubber and neoprene) and other plastics. The related diester from 2-ethylhexyl alcohol is used similarly. It is used to plasticize polylactic acid.It can also be used for plastics in use in the food packaging industry, in plastics used for medical devices, and for pharmaceutical applications, e.g. as a plasticizer for film coating of tablets, beads, and granules. It is also used as a lubricant in shaving lotions, and a flavoring additive in non-alcoholic beverages, ice cream, ices, candy, and baked goods. It provides excellent compatibility with a range of plastic materials, superior properties at low temperatures, and good oil resistivity. Its other names include Morflex, Kodaflex, polycizer, Proviplast 1944 and PX 404. Dibutyl sebacate is also used as a desensitizer in Otto fuel II, a torpedo monopropellant.

== Related compounds ==
- Diethyl sebacate
