= Centralite =

Gunshot residue

Names
- Preferred IUPAC name N,N′-Diethyl-N,N′-diphenylurea
- Other names: Centralite 1; Carbamite; Ethyl centralite; N,N′-Diethylcarbanilide; Bis(N-ethyl-N-phenyl)urea; 1,3-Diethyl-1,3-diphenylurea; sym-Diethyldiphenylurea; USAF EK-1047

Identifiers
CAS Number	85-98-3
3D model (JSmol)	Interactive image
ChemSpider	6567
ECHA InfoCard	100.001.496
PubChem CID	6828
UNII	4169Z9SDJG
CompTox Dashboard (EPA)	DTXSID8025040
- InChI: InChI=1S/C17H20N2O/c1-3-18(15-11-7-5-8-12-15)17(20)19(4-2)16-13-9-6-10-14-16/h5-14H,3-4H2,1-2H3 Key: PZIMIYVOZBTARW-UHFFFAOYSA-N; InChI=1/C17H20N2O/c1-3-18(15-11-7-5-8-12-15)17(20)19(4-2)16-13-9-6-10-14-16/h5-14H,3-4H2,1-2H3 Key: PZIMIYVOZBTARW-UHFFFAOYAC
- SMILES: O=C(N(c1ccccc1)CC)N(c2ccccc2)CC

Properties
Chemical formula	C_{17}H_{20}N_{2}O
Molar mass	268.360 g·mol^{−1}
Appearance	White to light grey crystalline powder
Density	1.14 g/cm^{3}
Melting point	72.4 °C (162.3 °F; 345.5 K) Sublimes above melting point
Boiling point	325–330 °C (617–626 °F; 598–603 K)
Solubility in water	3 mg/100g (0 °C (32 °F; 273 K)); 8 mg/100g (20 °C (68 °F; 293 K)); 12 mg/100g (50 °C (122 °F; 323 K)); 30 mg/100g (85 °C (185 °F; 358 K))
Solubility in Ethanol	72.67 g/100g (20 °C (68 °F; 293 K)); 515.2 g/100g (50 °C (122 °F; 323 K))
Solubility in Acetone	58.4 g/100g
Solubility in Nitroglycerin	Soluble
Solubility in Glycerin	Soluble
Magnetic susceptibility (χ)	−134.05×10^{−6} cm^{3}/mol
- Except where otherwise noted, data are given for materials in their standard state (at 25 °C [77 °F], 100 kPa). verify (what is ?) Infobox references

Ethyl centralite is an organic compound. Its chemical name is N,N′-diethyl-N,N′-diphenylurea. The molecular formula of ethyl centralite is C_{17}H_{20}N_{2}O. This compound has important uses in industry and forensics. The structure of ethyl centralite includes two phenyl groups (aromatic rings) attached to a central urea group. There are also ethyl groups (−C_{2}H_{5}) bound to the nitrogen atoms of the urea. Its primary use is as a stabilizer in double and triple-base smokeless powders.

== History ==
In the 19th century chemists identified that nitrocellulose can destroy itself with the help of nitrogen oxides separating from it at storage, and tried to find bases which might capture those oxides. Urea was used for stabilizing celluloid in the 19th century (and even in early American military powders), but like other water-soluble bases, it also attacks nitrocellulose, so German chemists substituted hydrogen atoms with nonpolar organic radicals to diminish this effect.

== Naming ==
The term "Centralite" was originally applied to dimethyldiphenylurea developed about 1906 at the German private military-industrial laboratory Zentralstelle für wissenschaftlich-technische Untersuchungen (Center for Scientific-Technical Research) in Neubabelsberg as a deterrent coating for smokeless powder in military rifle cartridges. Thereafter, all hydrocarbon-substituted symmetrical diphenyl urea compounds used as smokeless powder deterrents (or moderants) were called centralites after the laboratory. The preferred ethyl centralite became known as Centralite 1 and the original methyl centralite was identified as Centralite 2. Butyl centralite was also used as a celluloid plasticizer.

== Comparison with analogs ==
Centralite-2, also known as sym-dimethyldiphenylurea, is a methyl analog that is moderately utilized in parts of the world. Though they are likewise excellent plasticizers, centralites are thought to be a little less effective stabilizer than 2-Nitrodiphenylamine. To benefit from their plasticizing qualities, they are commonly employed in propellants at higher fractions than diphenylamines.

== Synthesis ==
The first synthesis of ethyl centralite was performed in 1876 by heating ethylphenylcarbamyl chloride with monoethylaniline at 130 °C (266 °F) and by heating diethylaniline with phosgene under pressure.

== Applications ==
=== Smokeless powder ===
Ethyl centralite acts as a stabilizer in double-base smokeless powder. The nitrocellulose and nitroglycerin in double-base smokeless powder decompose over time. This process is faster when exposed to heat, moisture. The decomposition creates acidic nitrogen oxides. This process is auto-catalytic, meaning that the breakdown itself accelerates its rate and it can reach out of control rates over time, leading to fire or explosion. Ethyl centralite inhibits the degradation process as it is progressively nitrated by the released nitrogen oxides. This slows down the overall decomposition of the powder until it is consumed when it is nitrated as extensively as possible. Some of the compounds formed directly from ethyl centralite in stabilized propellants subjected to rapid aging are 4-nitro, 4,4'-dinitro, 2,4,4'-trinitro, and 2-nitroethylcarbanilides. Many others are formed by splitting of the urea structure.

Small quantities of ethyl centralite (1%) only act as a stabilizer, but concentrations from 3%–10% may act as a gelatinizer or flash reducer.

=== Forensic science ===
Ethyl centralite is an important organic compound detected by GunShot Residue (GSR analysis). When a gun is fired, the smokeless powder used as fuel burns. This creates a mixture of gases and particles. It is released along with other residues. Forensic scientists use advanced techniques like gas chromatography-mass spectrometry (GC-MS) to detect ethyl centralite in the residue collected from a suspect or crime scene. Some other compounds may be present in the environment, but ethyl centralite is strongly linked to the firing of a gun. Its presence in GSR can be strong evidence connecting a suspect to the use of a firearm.

=== Other ===
Ethyl centralite is used as a polymerization catalyst and as an intermediate in the synthesis of pharmaceuticals.
