= Monopropellant =

Single-part rocket propellant

Monopropellants are propellants consisting of chemicals that release energy through exothermic chemical decomposition. The molecular bond energy of the monopropellant is released usually through use of a catalyst. This can be contrasted with bipropellants that release energy through the chemical reaction between an oxidizer and a fuel. While stable under defined storage conditions, monopropellants decompose very rapidly under certain other conditions to produce a large volume of its own energetic (hot) gases for the performance of mechanical work. Although solid deflagrants such as nitrocellulose, the most commonly used propellant in firearms, could be thought of as monopropellants, the term is usually reserved for liquids in engineering literature.

== Uses ==
The most common use of monopropellants is in low-impulse monopropellant rocket motors, such as reaction control thrusters, the usual propellant being hydrazine which is generally decomposed by exposure to an iridium catalyst bed (the hydrazine is pre-heated to keep the reactant liquid). This decomposition produces the desired jet of hot gas and thus thrust. Hydrogen peroxide has been used as a power source for propellant tank pumps in rockets like the German WWII V-2 and the American Redstone. The hydrogen peroxide is passed through a platinum catalyst mesh, or comes in contact with manganese dioxide impregnated ceramic beads, or Z-Stoff permanganate solution is co-injected, which causes hydrogen peroxide to decompose into hot steam and oxygen.

Monopropellants are also used in some air-independent propulsion systems (AIP) to "fuel" reciprocating or turbine engines in environments where free oxygen is unavailable. Weapons intended primarily for combat between nuclear-powered submarines generally fall into this category. The most commonly used propellant in this case is stabilized propylene glycol dinitrate (PGDN), often referred to as "Otto fuel". A potential future use for monopropellants not directly related to propulsion is in compact, high-intensity powerplants for aquatic or exoatmospheric environments.

== Research in brief ==
Much work was done in the US in the 1950s and 1960s to attempt to find better and more energetic monopropellants. For the most part, researchers came to the conclusion that any single substance that contained enough energy to compete with bipropellants would be too unstable to handle safely under practical conditions. With new materials, control systems and requirements for high-performance thrusters, engineers are currently re-examining this assumption.

Many partially nitrated alcohol esters are suitable for use as monopropellants. "Trimethylene glycol dinitrate" or 1,3-propanediol dinitrate is isomeric with PGDN, and produced as a fractional byproduct in all but the most exacting laboratory conditions; the marginally lower specific gravity (and thus energy density) of this compound argues against its use, but the minor differences in chemistry may prove useful in the future.

The related "dinitrodiglycol", more properly termed diethylene glycol dinitrate in modern notation, was widely used in World War 2 Germany, both alone as a liquid monopropellant and colloidal with nitrocellulose as a solid propellant. The otherwise desirable characteristics of this compound; it is quite stable, easy to manufacture, and has a very high energy density; are marred by a high freeze point (-11.5 deg. C) and pronounced thermal expansion, both being problematic in spacecraft. "Dinitrochlorohydrin" and "tetranitrodiglycerin" are also likely candidates, though no current use is known. The polynitrates of long chain and aromatic hydrocarbons are invariably room temperature solids, but many are soluble in simple alcohols or ethers in high proportion, and may be useful in this state.

Hydrazine, ethylene oxide, hydrogen peroxide (especially in its German World War II form as T-Stoff), and nitromethane are common rocket monopropellants. As noted the specific impulse of monopropellants is lower than bipropellants and can be found with the Air Force Chemical Equilibrium Specific Impulse Code tool.

One newer monopropellant under development is nitrous oxide, both neat and in the form of nitrous oxide fuel blends. Nitrous oxide offers the advantages of being self-pressurizing and of being relatively non-toxic, with a specific impulse intermediate between hydrogen peroxide and hydrazine. Nitrous oxide generates oxygen upon decomposition, and it is possible to blend it with fuels to form a monopropellant mixture with a specific impulse up to 325 s, comparable to hypergolic bipropellants. In 2018 a new precious metal catalyst was invented for use with nitrous oxide - rhodium oxide on alumina spheres – which is more stable at higher temperatures than pure rhodium or iridium.

Direct comparison of physical properties, performance, cost, storability, toxicity, storage requirements and accidental release measures for hydrogen peroxide, hydroxylammonium nitrate (HAN), hydrazine and various cold gas monopropellants shows that hydrazine is the highest performing in terms of specific impulse. However, hydrazine is also the most expensive and toxic. In addition HAN and hydrogen peroxide have the highest density impulse (total impulse per given unit volume).

== See also ==
- Monopropellant rocket
- Nitrous oxide fuel blend
- Green Propellant Infusion Mission
