= Propellant management device =

Device to expel propellant in low gravity

A propellant management device (PMD) provides a way to expel propellant in a low-gravity environment. Devices can use surface tension as the primary expulsion device with a combination of baffles, fins, and vanes. The main goal of the PMD is to provide gas-free propellant to the rocket engine.

== Concept ==
In the absence of gravity, buoyancy forces do not determine liquid and gas position in a vessel. The positions are primarily driven by surface tension. The liquids tend to adhere to the walls and leave a gaseous bubble in the center of the vessel. Propellant management devices (PMDs) are required to provide gas-free operation of the engine.

PMDs are typically unique and specially designed for each mission.

== Types ==
There are two groups of PMDs, total communication and control-type. A total communication PMD can acquire propellant from anywhere in the tank.

=== Total communication PMD ===
There are three types of total communication PMDs: vane, gallery, and pleated-liner.

==== Vane ====
Vanes are used when the spacecraft experiences low acceleration and requires low propellant flow rates. Due to their simple mechanical design, they are low cost and highly reliable. They are typically used in small monopropellant thrusters or to refill another type of PMD: sponges. Vane length (whether it extends partially up the vessel or to the top) is partially determined by the shape of the tank. Cylindrical tanks require full-length vanes since a portion of the propellant could adhere to the forward tank head. Spherical tanks need full-length vanes in a case by case basis. If the acceleration is lateral, partial-length vanes can work.

A center post can be added to the tank in addition to the side vanes. This provides a direct path for the propellant to the tank outlet.

=== Control-type PMD ===
There are three types of control-type PMDs: sponge, trough, and trap.

Sponge PMDs are primarily used to provide the engine with propellant needed for ignition, providing the engine with propellant during a specific maneuver, and propellant control in microgravity environments.
