= SkySat =

Constellation of small Earth observation satellites

SkySat is a constellation of sub-meter resolution Earth observation satellites owned by Planet Labs, providing imagery, high-definition video and analytics services. Planet acquired the satellites with their purchase of Terra Bella (formerly Skybox Imaging), a Mountain View, California-based company founded in 2009 by Dan Berkenstock, Julian Mann, John Fenwick, and Ching-Yu Hu, from Google in 2017.

== Overview ==
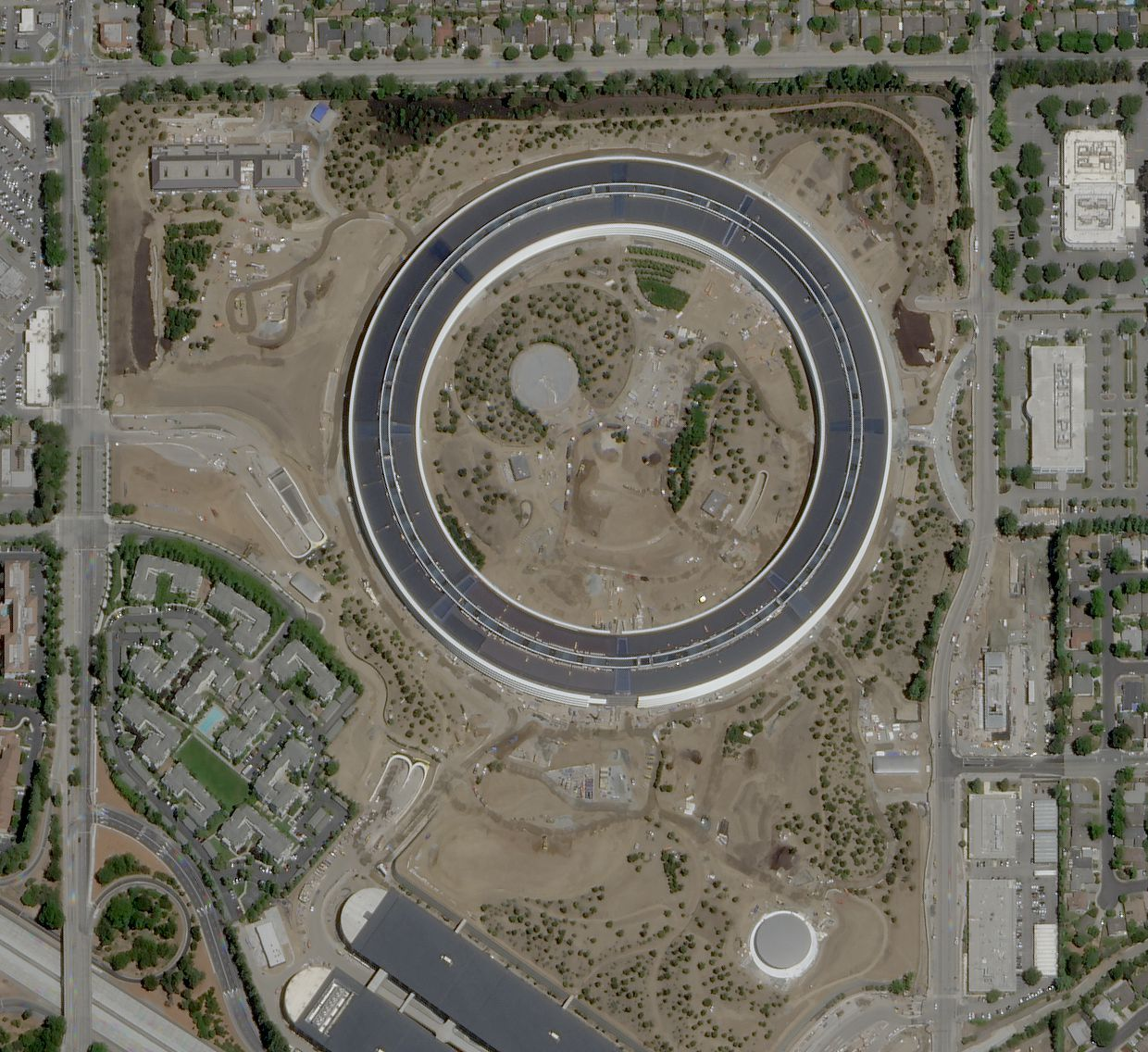
SkySat image of Apple Park taken in May 2017.

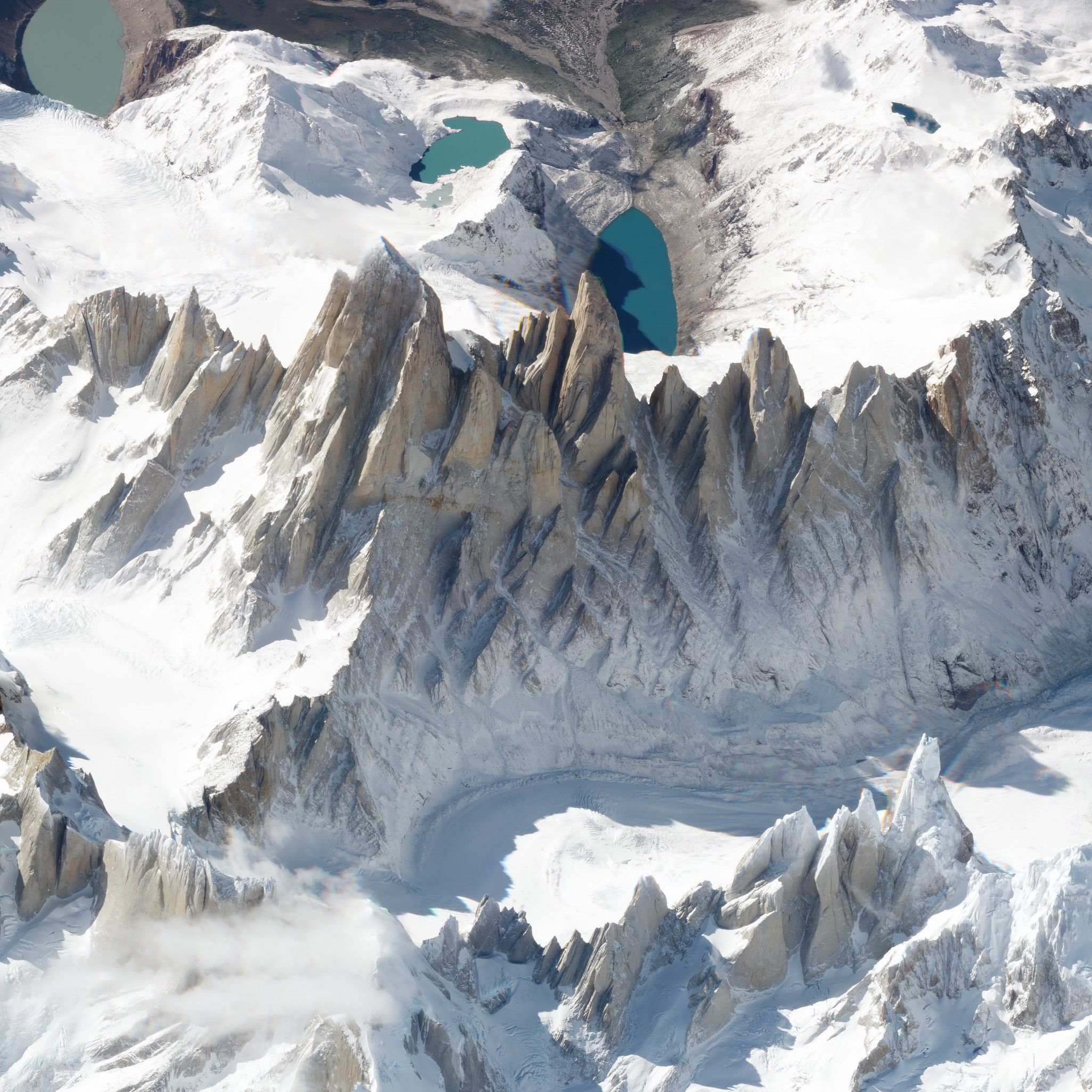
SkySat off-nadir image of Fitz Roy

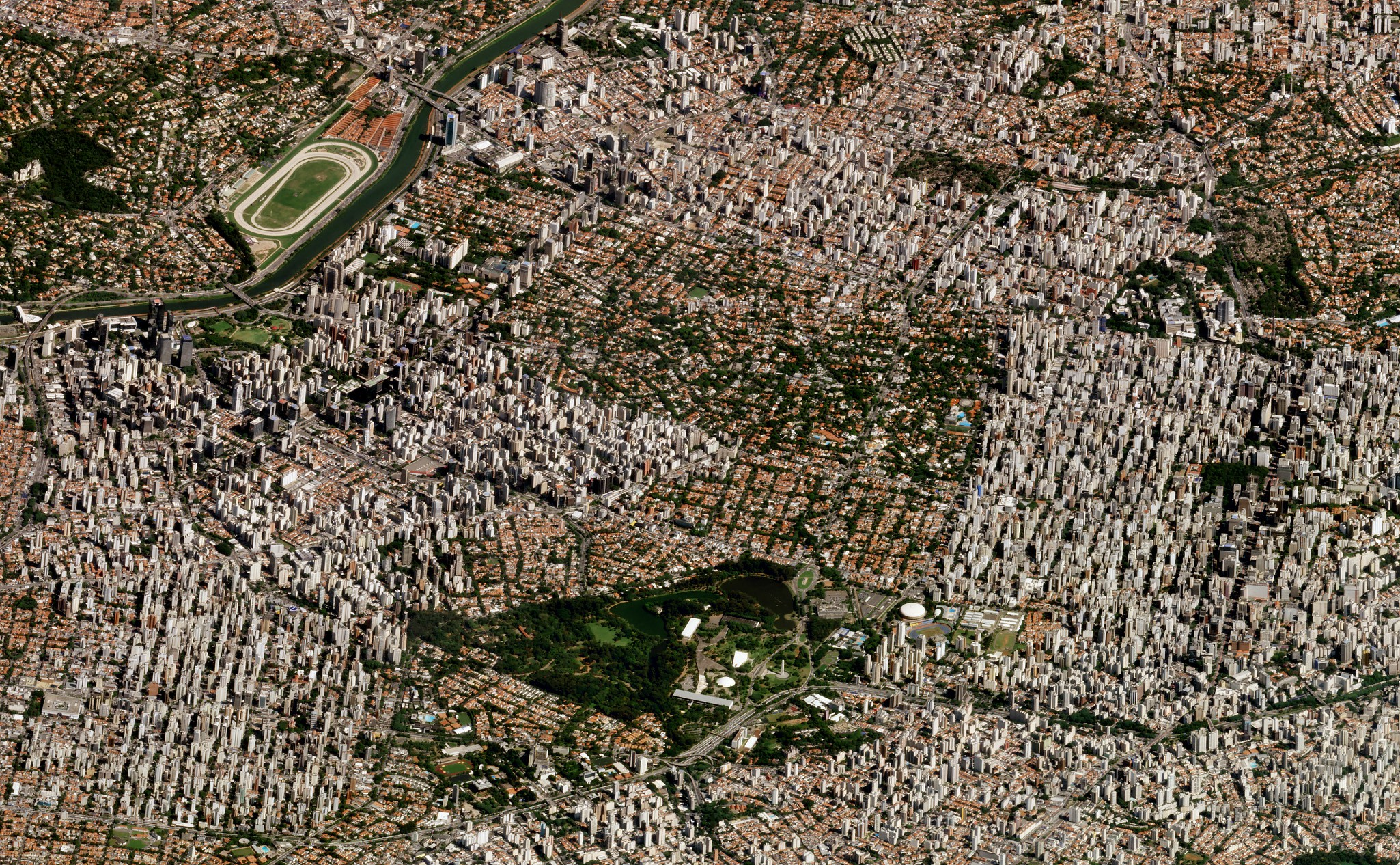
SkySat image of São Paulo, the largest city in Brazil

The resolution of the SkySat satellite imagery and videos is high enough to observe objects that impact the global economy such as terrain, cars and shipping containers. The satellites can capture video clips lasting up to 90 seconds at 30 frames per second. The high-definition satellite video from SkySat satellites "could help us understand our world better by analyzing movement of goods and people, providing visual data about supply chains, shipping, industrial plant activity, and even humanitarian relief efforts".

The constellation's goal is to be able to provide high-resolution satellite imagery of any place on Earth multiple times a day. When Skybox originally developed the satellites, they planned to "change the nature" of the satellite industry by building satellites with "off-the-shelf" electronics that cost under US$50 million.

== History ==
By April 2012, Skybox Imaging had raised a total of $91 million (equivalent to about $128M in 2025) of private capital from Khosla Ventures, Bessemer Venture Partners, Canaan Partners and Norwest Venture Partners to develop the SkySat constellation.

On 21 November 2013, the first satellite, SkySat-1, was launched on a Dnepr rocket from Dombarovsky Air Base, Russia. Less than a month later, on 11 December 2013, the first images captured by the SkySat-1 satellite, of Perth, Abu Dhabi, and the coast of Somalia, were released. The second satellite, SkySat-2, launched on a Soyuz-2/Fregat rocket from Baikonur, Kazakhstan on 8 July 2014. The company plans to eventually launch a fleet of 24 satellites. and released its first images within 48 hours of launch.

On 10 February 2014, SSL announced that Skybox had awarded it a contract to build 13 more satellites based on a revised "SkySat C" design. The first of these, Skysat-3, also referred to as SkySat-C1, was launched on 22 June 2016 by Indian Space Research Organisation (ISRO) on Polar Satellite Launch Vehicle PSLV-C34.

On 10 June 2014, Skybox Imaging announced that it had entered into an agreement to be acquired by Google for $500 million (equivalent to about $680M in 2025). The acquisition was completed on 1 August 2014. Skybox Imaging changed its name to "Terra Bella" on 8 March 2016, to indicate its focus on image analytics. The new name was partially based on the Terra Bella Avenue in Mountain View, California, where the company's headquarters are located. Terra bella is Italian for "beautiful Earth". The name change was also partially due to perceived trademark infringement that came to light in the Google acquisition.

Four more SkySat units were launched on 16 September 2016, by the Vega rocket's seventh flight from Kourou.

In 2017, Google sold Terra Bella and its SkySat satellite constellation to Planet Labs, adding to their existing fleet of around 50 satellites, for an undisclosed price and entered into a multi-year agreement to purchase SkySat imaging data. Planet Labs launched six more SkySat satellites, along with four Dove CubeSats, on a Minotaur-C rocket from Vandenberg Air Force Base on 31 October 2017. An additional two SkySat satellites and three Dove CubeSats were launched on a Falcon 9 rocket from Vandenberg on 3 December 2018.

== Satellite constellation ==
The SkySat satellites are based on the CubeSat concept, using inexpensive automotive grade electronics and fast commercially available processors, but scaled up to approximately the size of a minifridge. The satellites are approximately 80 centimetres (31 in) long, compared to approximately 30 centimetres (12 in) for a 3U CubeSat, and weigh 220 pounds (100 kg).

The first three prototype satellites (SkySat-1, 2 and 3) were produced by Skybox Imaging in-house. SkySats 1 & 2 did not have a propulsion system, SkySat 3 had a propulsion system built by ECAPS in Sweden.

The other 13 satellites are manufactured by SSL, the optical payloads are built by L3 Technologies, and the satellite thrusters are provided by ECAPS. The 13 SkySat-C satellites are slightly larger and heavier (with mass about 120 kg or 264 lbs) than the prototypes. They have a planned operational life of 6 years.

The SkySat-C satellites were put on a 500-kilometre (310 mi) Sun-synchronous orbit.

Three of Planet's commercial SkySat (SkySat-16, -17 and -18) Earth-imaging spacecraft launched on top of a stack of 58 SpaceX Starlink-8 satellites on 13 June 2020 aboard a Falcon 9 rocket, and three more (SkySat-19, -20 and -21) hitched a ride on another SpaceX mission on August 18, 2020. Built by Maxar Technologies, each of the SkySat satellites weighs around 110 kilograms (240 lb) at launch. The SkySats are about the size of a mini-refrigerator, and their optical instruments produce images of Earth with a resolution of 50 cm, according to Planet.

=== List of satellites ===
There have been 21 satellites launched.

Name	Alt name	COSPAR ID	Date of launch	Rocket	Launch site	Refs
SkySat-1		2013-066C	21 November 2013	Dnepr	Dombarovsky Air Base, Russia	
SkySat-2		2014-037D	8 July 2014	Soyuz-2.1b	Baikonur, Kazakhstan	
SkySat-3	SkySat-C1; SkySat Gen2-1	2016-040C	22 June 2016	PSLV-XL C34	SHAR, Sriharikota, India	
SkySat-4	SkySat-C2	2016-058D	16 September 2016	Vega	Centre Spatial Guyanais, Kourou	
SkySat-5	SkySat-C3	2016-058E	16 September 2016	Vega	Centre Spatial Guyanais, Kourou	
SkySat-6	SkySat-C4	2016-058B	16 September 2016	Vega	Centre Spatial Guyanais, Kourou	
SkySat-7	SkySat-C5	2016-058C	16 September 2016	Vega	Centre Spatial Guyanais, Kourou	
SkySat-8	SkySat-C6	2017-068F	31 October 2017	Minotaur-C 3210	Vandenberg Air Force Base	
SkySat-9	SkySat-C7	2017-068E	31 October 2017	Minotaur-C 3210	Vandenberg Air Force Base	
SkySat-10	SkySat-C8	2017-068D	31 October 2017	Minotaur-C 3210	Vandenberg Air Force Base	
SkySat-11	SkySat-C9	2017-068C	31 October 2017	Minotaur-C 3210	Vandenberg Air Force Base	
SkySat-12	SkySat-C10	2017-068B	31 October 2017	Minotaur-C 3210	Vandenberg Air Force Base	
SkySat-13	SkySat-C11	2017-068A	31 October 2017	Minotaur-C 3210	Vandenberg Air Force Base	
SkySat-14	SkySat-C12	2018-099AR	3 December 2018	Falcon 9 Block 5	Vandenberg Air Force Base	
SkySat-15	SkySat-C13	2018-099AW	3 December 2018	Falcon 9 Block 5	Vandenberg Air Force Base	
SkySat-16	SkySat-C14	2020-038BL	13 June 2020	Falcon 9 Block 5	Cape Canaveral Air Force Station, SLC-40	
SkySat-17	SkySat-C15	2020-038BM	13 June 2020	Falcon 9 Block 5	Cape Canaveral Air Force Station, SLC-40	
SkySat-18	SkySat-C16	2020-038BN	13 June 2020	Falcon 9 Block 5	Cape Canaveral Air Force Station, SLC-40	
SkySat-19	SkySat-C17	2020-057BQ	18 August 2020	Falcon 9 Block 5	Cape Canaveral Air Force Station, SLC-40	
SkySat-20	SkySat-C18	2020-057BR	18 August 2020	Falcon 9 Block 5	Cape Canaveral Air Force Station, SLC-40	
SkySat-21	SkySat-C19	2020-057BS	18 August 2020	Falcon 9 Block 5	Cape Canaveral Air Force Station, SLC-40	
