= Astroscale =

Orbital debris removal company

Astroscale Holdings Inc.
- Type: Public
- Industry: On-orbit servicing
- Founded: 4 May 2013
- Founder: Mitsunobu Okada
- Headquarters: Tokyo, Japan
- Number of employees: 130 (2020)
- Website: astroscale.com

Astroscale Holdings Inc. is a public on-orbit servicing company headquartered in Tokyo, Japan. The company is developing life extension, in-situ space situational awareness, end-of-life and active debris removal solutions.

== History ==
Astroscale was founded in 2013 by IT entrepreneur Mitsunobu "Nobu" Okada in Singapore. In April 2013, Okada attended an academic conference in Germany on space development where space junk was a hot topic. Many experts gave presentations on the issue and talked about potential solutions, but Okada was not impressed because no one had a real plan of action. Ten days later, he founded Astroscale to tackle the issue.

On 16 February 2015, the company raised US$7.7 million in venture capital financing. The capital was used to set up an R&D facility and office in Tokyo to accelerate the development of satellites and future space debris removal missions. On 1 March 2016, Astroscale announced a further US$35 million in funding and on 21 March 2017, incorporated Astroscale Ltd. in the United Kingdom. Astroscale announced it had completed a Series C funding round and raised US$25 million on 14 July 2017.

On 21 November 2017, Astroscale and Surrey Satellite Technology (SSTL) signed a memorandum of understanding (MOU) to pursue joint opportunities in areas of innovative on-orbit technologies and missions designed to safeguard the orbital environment for future generations. As a first step, Astroscale contracted SSTL to supply the Client satellite and avionics for its ELSA-d mission.

Astroscale established a ground station in Totsuka-ku, Yokohama on 4 July 2018. The primary purpose of the ground station is to enable the operation of ELSA-d.

On 24 July 2018, Astroscale received a £4 million grant from the Government of the United Kingdom and established the National In-orbit Servicing Control Centre Facility at the Satellite Applications Catapult in Harwell, Oxfordshire. The facility will support advanced robotics activities in the very hostile environment of space, specifically enabling the provision of a commercial service for de-orbiting small satellites. The new facility will initially control Astroscale's ELSA-d mission.

On 31 October 2018, Astroscale obtained additional funding of US$50 million, bringing total amount of capital investment to US$102 million.

Astroscale announced the incorporation of Astroscale U.S. Inc. and the opening of its Denver, Colorado office at the 35th Space Symposium in Colorado Springs, Colorado. With an additional US$30 million secured in an extension of its Series D investment round, Astroscale announced its plans to expand its United States presence, focusing on business development, policy influence and technology growth.

On 23 January 2020, Astroscale announced it had been awarded a grant of up to US$4.5 million from the Tokyo Metropolitan Government's "Innovation Tokyo Project" to build a roadmap for commercializing active debris removal (ADR) services.

On 3 June 2020, Astroscale U.S. Inc. announced it had entered into a definitive agreement to acquire the intellectual property and other assets and to hire certain members of the staff of Effective Space Solutions R&D Ltd., an Israeli satellite life-extension and servicing company. These moves make Astroscale the only company solely dedicated to on-orbit services across low Earth orbit (LEO) and geostationary orbit (GEO) and bring the company closer to realizing its vision of orbital sustainability for future generations.

On 11 January 2022, Astroscale announced it has reached an agreement to prebuy fuel for its Life Extension In-orbit (LEXI™) Servicer.

In 2023, the Japanese government awarded US$80 million to Astroscale through 2028.

In November 2024, Astroscale Japan has announced that its commercial debris inspection demonstration satellite, Active Debris Removal by Astroscale-Japan (ADRAS-J), successfully approached a large piece of space debris — a rocket upper stage — to approximately 15 meters. This is the closest approach ever achieved by a commercial company to space debris through Rendezvous and Proximity Operations (RPO).

In March 2025, Airbus Defence and Space has placed the first large-scale commercial order for Astroscale UK's second-generation docking plates, securing a deal of more than 100 units. These docking plates are designed to facilitate in-orbit servicing and end-of-life satellite removal, integration with various satellite platforms supporting multiple docking methods, including robotic and magnetic capture.

In June 2025, Defence Science and Technology Laboratory (Dstl) announced that it had awarded the £5.15 million Orpheus mission contract to Astroscale UK, which is the successor to the Prometheus-2 and CIRCE missions that were lost aboard the Virgin Orbit launch in 2023. The project will be carried out alongside subcontractor Open Cosmos.

== Missions ==
=== IDEA OSG1 ===
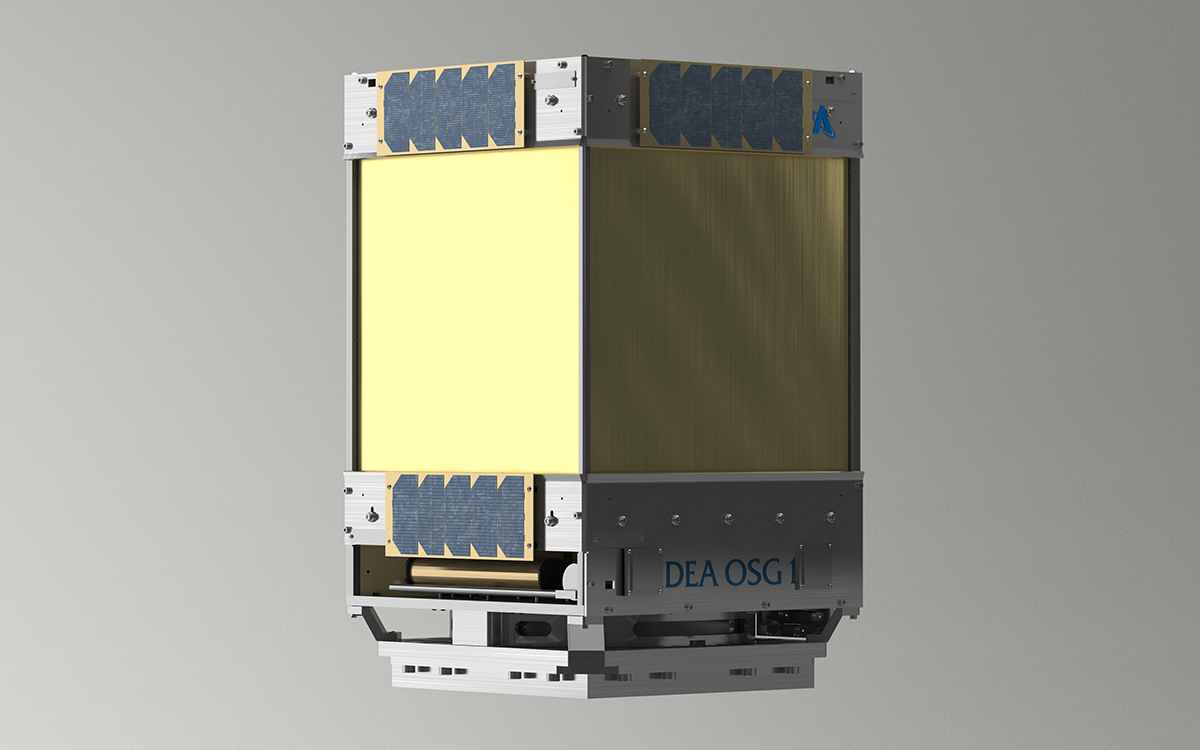
IDEA OSG 1

Between 2015 and 2017 Astroscale designed, built, tested, and launched a 25 kg micro-lite satellite called IDEA OSG 1 (In-situ Debris Environment Analysis OSG1), an In-situ Debris Environment Analysis mission. The mission was designed to measure sub-millimetre size debris in low Earth orbit. IDEA OSG1, Meteor-M No.2-1, and 17 other satellites on the Soyuz-2.1b launch vehicle failed to reach orbit due to human error in the programming of the rocket.

=== ELSA-D ===
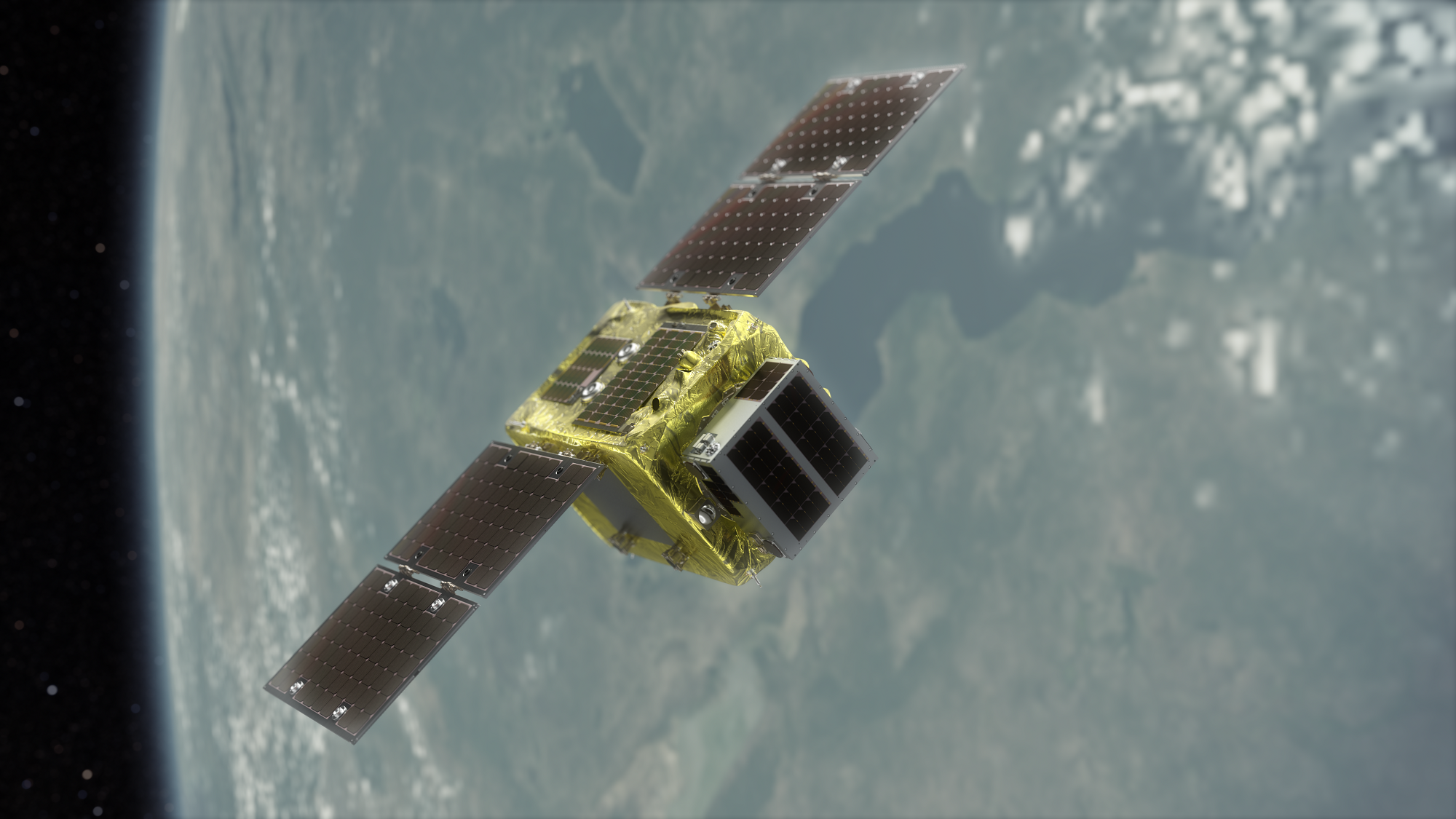
ELSA-d consists of two spacecraft, a Servicer and a Client, launched stacked together on 22 March 2021

The End-of-Life Services by Astroscale (ELSA) program is a spacecraft retrieval service for satellite operators. ELSA-d (demonstration) is the first mission to demonstrate the core technologies necessary for debris docking and removal. It was launched on 22 March 2021.

ELSA-d consists of two spacecraft, a Servicer (~184 kg) and a Client (~16 kg), launched stacked together. The Servicer is equipped with proximity rendezvous technologies and a magnetic docking mechanism, while the Client has a ferromagnetic plate which enables it to be docked with. The Servicer will repeatedly release and dock with the Client in a series of technical demonstrations proving the capability to find and dock with debris. Demonstrations include target search, target inspection, target rendezvous, and both non-tumbling and tumbling docking. The first release and docking test was successfully conducted on 25 August 2021. ELSA-d is operated from the National In-orbit Servicing Control Centre Facility in Harwell, United Kingdom, a facility developed by Astroscale as a key part of the ground segment.

=== ADRAS-J ===
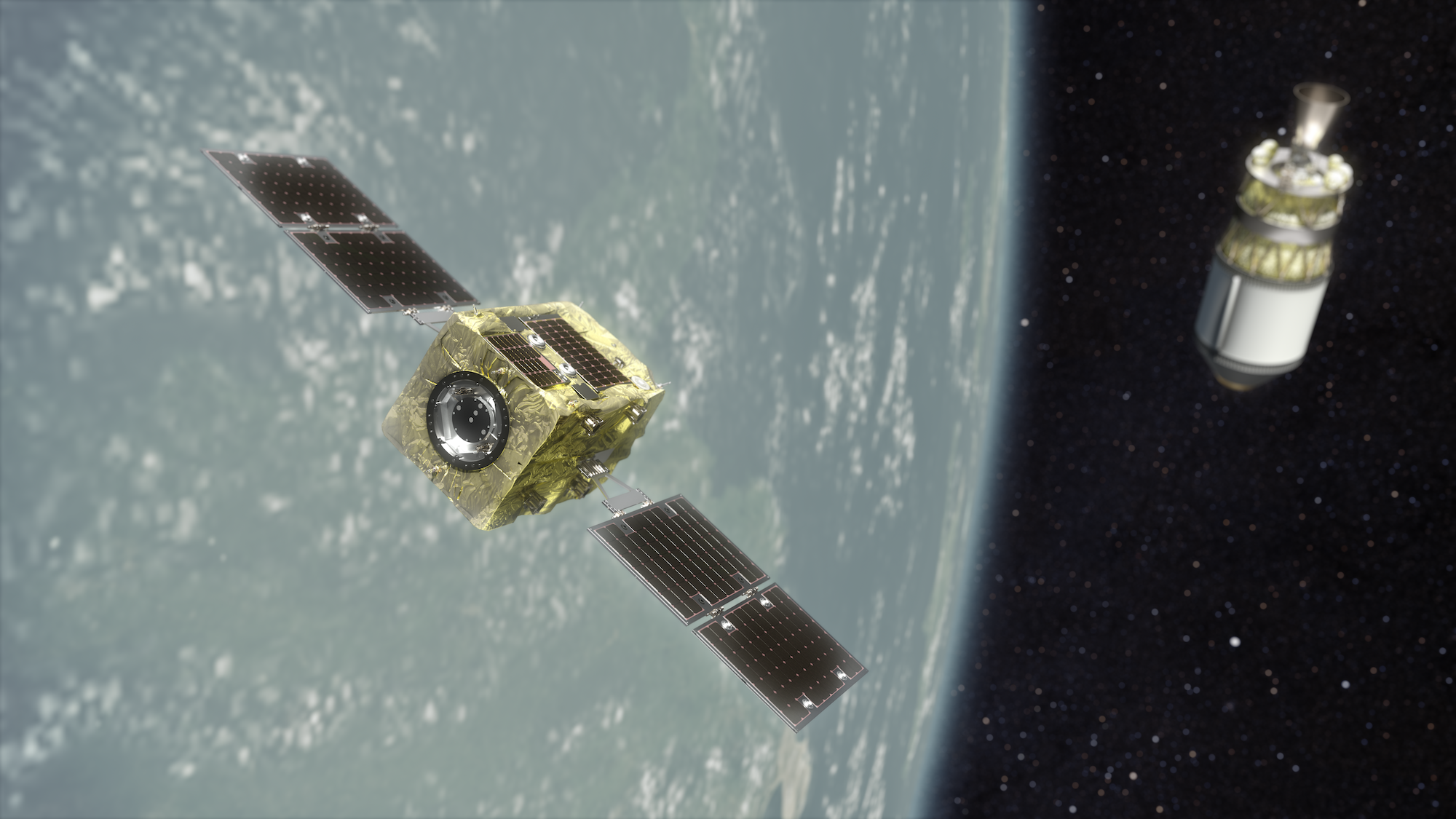
ADRAS-J

In February 2020, Astroscale announced its selection as the commercial partner for Phase I of JAXA's first debris removal project. The JAXA Commercial Removal of Debris Demonstration project (CRD2) consists of two mission phases to achieve one of the world's first debris removal missions of a large object, the first of which has been awarded to Astroscale. This first phase will be demonstrated by the end of the Japan Fiscal Year 2022 and will focus on data acquisition on an upper stage Japanese rocket body. Astroscale will be responsible for the manufacturing, launch and operations of the satellite that will characterize the rocket body, acquiring and delivering movement observational data to better understand the debris environment. In September 2021, Rocket Lab and Astroscale announced that the ADRAS-J (Active Debris Removal by Astroscale-Japan) mission would be launched in February 2024.

The spacecraft launched as scheduled. In 2024, ADRAS-J became the first spacecraft to approach a piece of space debris in low-Earth orbit, an upper stage from a Japanese H-IIA rocket launched in 2009. ADRAS-J approachet the stage at a distance of 15 m and then completed a 360° fly-around, documenting the object.

=== ADRAS-J2 ===
The mission to deorbit a second stage of the H2A rocket will be launched in 2027.

=== ELSA-M ===
ELSA-M is a space debris-removal vehicle developed by Astroscale's UK subsidiary for Eutelsat, ESA, and UKSA. It is expected to launch no earlier than 2028.
