= Prisma (satellite project) =

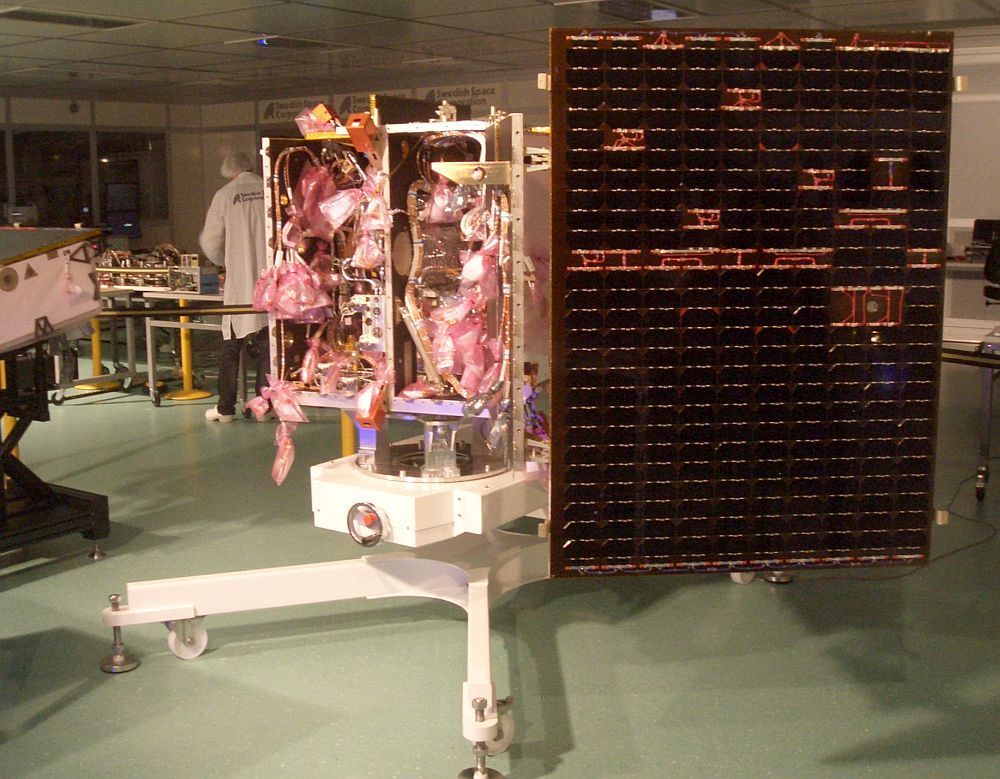
- Prisma satellite during integration
- Mission type: Technology demonstrator
- Operator: Swedish National Space Board, DLR, CNES
- COSPAR ID: Mango: 2010-028B; Tango: 2010-028F
- SATCAT no.: Mango: 36599; Tango: 36827
- Mission duration: 1 year planned 14 years, 9 months and 10 days elapsed

Spacecraft properties
- Manufacturer: Saab Ericsson Space, Omnisys Instruments, ECAPS
- Launch mass: Mango: 145 kg (320 lb); Tango: 50 kg (110 lb)
- Dimensions: Mango: 80 cm × 130 cm (31 in × 51 in); Tango: 80 cm × 31 cm (31 in × 12 in)
- Power: Mango: 300 watts Tango: 90 watts

Start of mission
- Launch date: 15 June 2010, 14:42:16 UTC
- Rocket: Dnepr rocket
- Launch site: Dombarovsky 370/13
- Contractor: ISC Kosmotras

Orbital parameters
- Reference system: Geocentric
- Regime: Sun-synchronous
- Semi-major axis: 7,086 kilometres (4,403 mi)
- Perigee altitude: 668.3 kilometres (415.3 mi)
- Apogee altitude: 749 kilometres (465 mi)
- Inclination: 98.4 degrees
- Period: 99 minutes
- Epoch: 24 March 2015, 11:08:39 UTC

Prisma is a satellite project led by the Swedish Space Corporation (SSC) which consist of two satellites that fly in formation. Prisma is operated in collaboration with CNES, the French space agency, which provides the radiofrequency metrology system that enables the satellites to fly in close formation while autonomously avoiding collisions.

It was launched, along with the PICARD spacecraft, on 15 June 2010 on a Dnepr launcher from Dombarovskiy Cosmodrome, near Yasny, Russia. Its primary objective is to test autonomous formation flying. A secondary objective was to flight test a new monopropellant thruster using ammonium dinitramide (ADN) propellant.

On 12 August 2010, SSC reported that the two satellites, called Mango and Tango, had separated from each other for the first time.
