= 2-Nitrodiphenylamine =

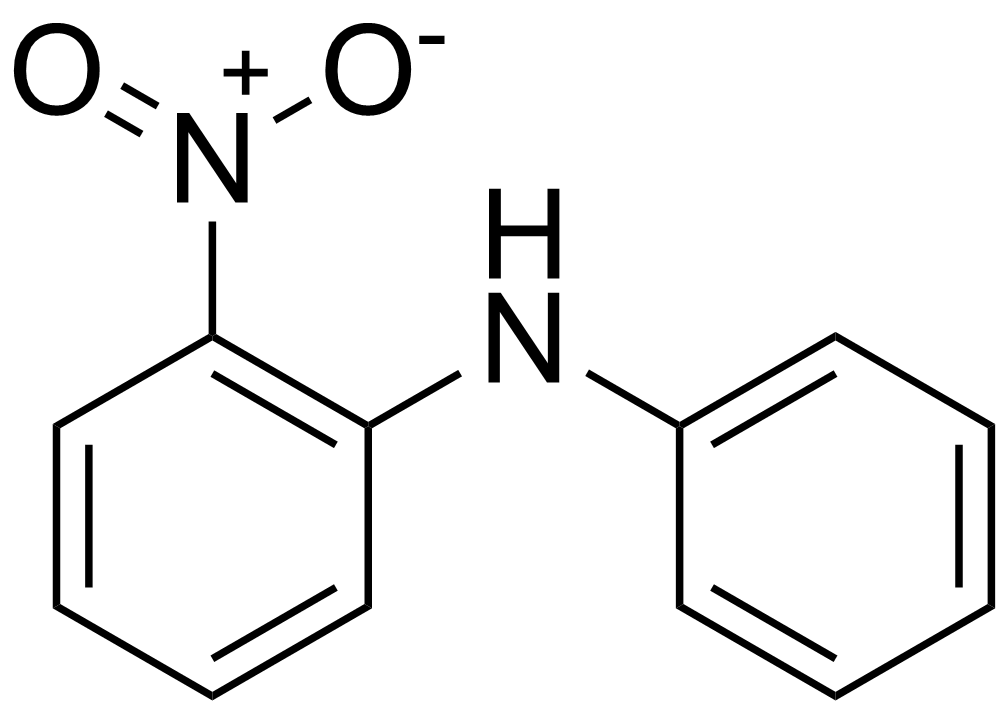

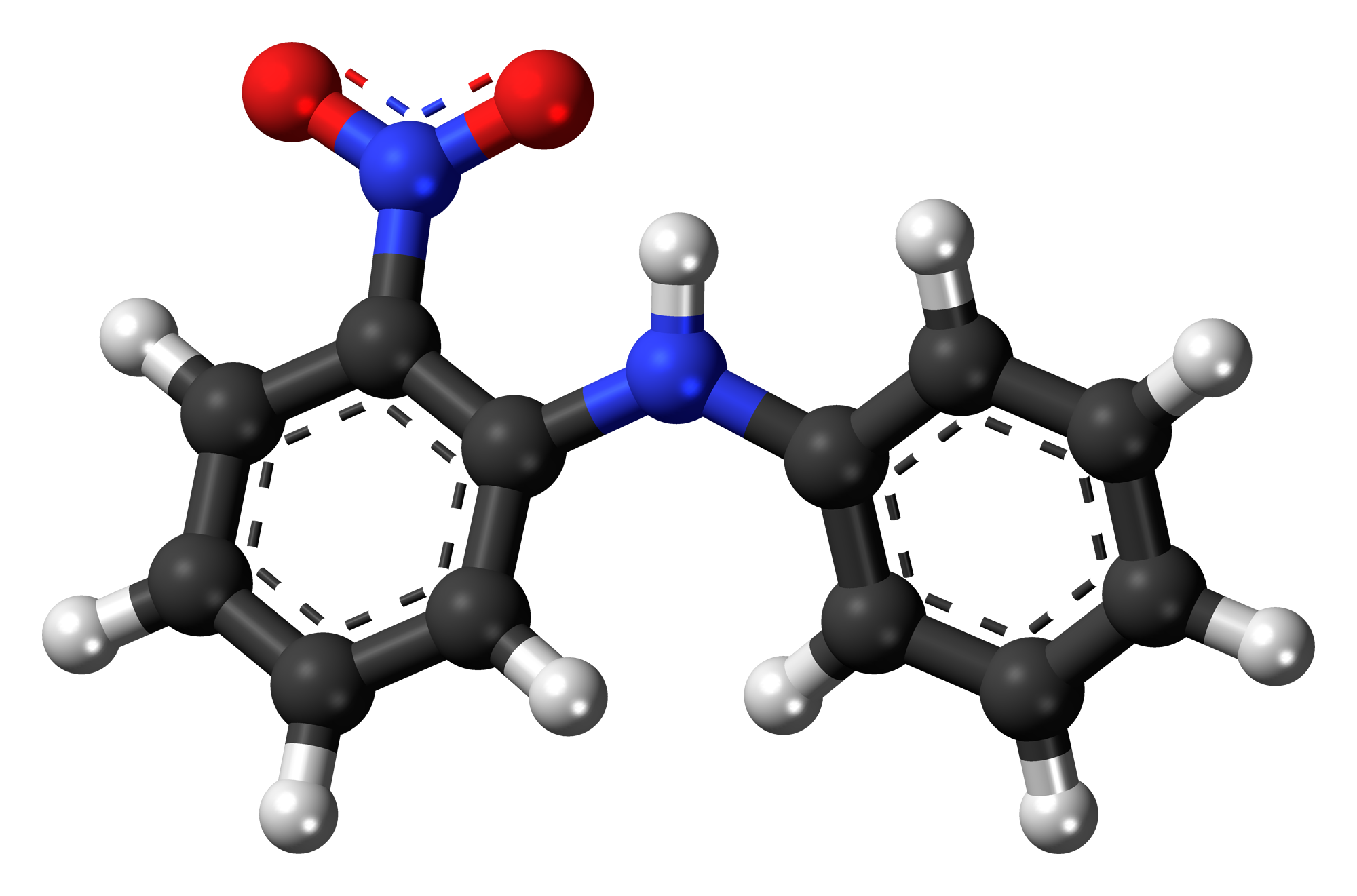

Names
- Preferred IUPAC name 2-Nitro-N-phenylaniline
- Other names NDPA, 2-NDPA, 2NO2DPA, Sudan Yellow 1339, C.I. 10335, CI 10335, phenyl 2-nitrophenylamine, 2-nitro-N-phenylaniline, or N-phenyl-o-nitroaniline

Identifiers
CAS Number	119-75-5
3D model (JSmol)	Interactive image; Interactive image
ChEMBL	ChEMBL1450018
ChemSpider	8100
ECHA InfoCard	100.003.953
EC Number	204-348-6
PubChem CID	8407
UNII	DT9NA7ZDD8
UN number	1661
CompTox Dashboard (EPA)	DTXSID4025749
- InChI: InChI=1S/C12H10N2O2/c15-14(16)12-9-5-4-8-11(12)13-10-6-2-1-3-7-10/h1-9,13H Key: RUKISNQKOIKZGT-UHFFFAOYSA-N; InChI=1/C12H10N2O2/c15-14(16)12-9-5-4-8-11(12)13-10-6-2-1-3-7-10/h1-9,13H Key: RUKISNQKOIKZGT-UHFFFAOYAD
- SMILES: O=[N+]([O-])C1=C(NC2=CC=CC=C2)C=CC=C1; [O-][N+](=O)c2ccccc2Nc1ccccc1

Properties
Chemical formula	C_{12}H_{10}N_{2}O_{2}
Molar mass	214.224 g·mol^{−1}
Density	1.403 g/cm^{3}
Melting point	74 to 75 °C (165 to 167 °F; 347 to 348 K)

Hazards
- GHS labelling
Pictograms	(GHS07: Exclamation mark)
Signal word	Warning
Hazard statements	H315, H319, H335
Precautionary statements	P261, P264, P271, P280, P302+P352, P304+P340, P305+P351+P338, P312, P321, P332+P313, P337+P313, P362, P403+P233, P405, P501
- Except where otherwise noted, data are given for materials in their standard state (at 25 °C [77 °F], 100 kPa). verify (what is ?) Infobox references

2-Nitrodiphenylamine is an organic chemical with the formula C_{6}H_{5}NHC_{6}H_{4}NO_{2}. It is a nitrated derivative of diphenylamine. It is a red solid, usually found in form of flakes or powder. It is polar but hydrophobic.

Diphenylamine is used to extend the shelf-life of explosives containing nitrocellulose or nitroglycerin. Such nitrated materials release nitrogen oxides, which deteriorate the device. The diphenylamine traps NO_{2}, affording the title compound and related species. And the title compound further traps additional nitrogen oxides. One of its major uses is to control the explosion rate of propylene glycol dinitrate.

As a stabilizer, its major role is to eliminate the acidic nitrates and nitrogen oxides produced by gradual decomposition of nitric acid esters, which would otherwise autocatalyze further decomposition. Its amount is usually 1-2% of the mixture; higher amounts than 2% degrade the propellant's ballistic properties. The amount of the stabilizer depletes with time; remaining content of less than 0.5% (with initial 2% content) requires increased surveillance of the munition, with less than 0.2% warranting immediate disposal, as the depletion of the stabilizer may lead to autoignition of the propellant.

Other stabilizers of a similar nature are 4-nitrodiphenylamine, N-nitrosodiphenylamine. While N-methyl-p-nitroaniline (MNA also used in IMX-101), and diphenylamine (DPA) are more commonly employed.
