= Nitrous oxide fuel blend =

Class of liquid rocket propellants

Nitrous oxide fuel blend propellants are a class of liquid rocket propellants that were intended in the early 2010s to be able to replace hydrazine as the standard storable rocket propellent in some applications.

In nitrous-oxide fuel blends, the fuel and oxidizer are blended and stored; this is sometimes referred to as a mixed monopropellant. Upon use, the propellant is heated or passed over a catalyst bed and the nitrous oxide decomposes into oxygen-rich gasses. Combustion then ensues. Special care is needed in the chemical formulation and engine design to prevent detonating the stored fuel.

== Overview ==
The propellant used in a rocket engine plays an important role in both engine design and in design of the launch vehicle and related ground equipment to service the vehicle. Weight, energy density, cost, toxicity, risk of explosions, and other problems make it important for engineers to design rockets with appropriate propellants. The major classes of rocket fuels are:

Fuel types

- Liquid rocket propellants
- Solid propellants
- Hybrid rocket

Designs using one or more fuels

- Monopropellants
- Bipropellants
- Tripropellants

A common fuel in small maneuvering thrusters is hydrazine. It is liquid at room temperature and, having a positive enthalpy of formation, can be used as a monopropellant to greatly simplify system design. But it is also extremely toxic and has a relatively high freezing point of +1C. It is also unstable, an inherent property of any substance with a positive enthalpy of formation.

Nitrous oxide can be used as an oxidizer with various fuels; it is popular mainly in hybrid rockets. It is far less toxic than hydrazine and has a much lower boiling point, though it can be liquified at room temperature under pressure. Like hydrazine it has a positive enthalpy of formation that makes it both potentially unstable and a viable monopropellant. It can be decomposed with a catalyst to produce a hot mixture of nitrogen and oxygen. When mixed with a fuel and stored before use, it becomes a mixed monopropellant.

== History ==
German rocket scientists were experimenting with nitrous oxide fuel blends as early as 1937. Nitrous oxide fuel blends testing continued throughout World War II. The promise of high performance, greater range and lighter feed systems drove experimentation with blends of nitrous oxide and ammonia, which resulted in numerous explosions and demolished motors. The complexities involved in building propulsion systems that can safely handle nitrous oxide fuel blend monopropellants have been a deterrent to serious development.

Subsequent development of nitrous oxide fuel blends picked up again in the 2000s, and in 2011 an in-space flight test mission was planned. In the event, the flight test was cancelled. Innovative Space Propulsion Systems had announced plans to test the NOFBX mono-propellant on the NASA portion of the International Space Station (ISS), with an initial tentative flight date no earlier than 2012. NASA formally approved the mission to the ISS on a 2013 launch slot in May 2012. The mission had been slated to travel to the ISS in the unpressurized cargo compartment of a SpaceX Dragon spacecraft during one of the contracted NASA cargo re-supply missions in mid-2013. The "ISPS NOFBX Green Propellant Demonstration" will utilize a deep-throttling 100 pounds-force (440 N)-thrust-class engine burning NOFBX rocket engine that will be mounted to the outside the European Columbus module on the ISS, and had been expected to remain on-orbit for approximately one year while undergoing a "series of in-space performance tests."

NOFBX was a trademarked name for a proprietary nitrous oxide/fuel/emulsifier blended mono-propellant developed by Firestar Technologies. The NOFBX patent claimed a mixture of nitrous oxide as the oxidizer with ethane, ethene or acetylene as the fuel.^{[8]} NOFBX has a higher specific impulse (I_{sp}) and is less toxic than other monopropellants currently used in space applications, such as hydrazine. Flight testing of NOFBX engines had been planned on the International Space Station, but, in the event, did not go forward.

NOFBX had previously been used to fuel a reciprocating engine to power high-altitude, long-endurance drone aircraft under a DARPA contract. NOFBX was promoted by the company at the time as a "game changing" technology with the several characteristics that underline why safer monopropellants were of interest in the industry:

- constituents are widely available from chemical suppliers, inexpensive and safe to handle
- can be transported and handled without undue precautions or hazards
- its end products (N_{2}, CO, H_{2}O, H_{2} and CO_{2}) are all substantially less toxic than traditional long-duration storable monopropellants and produce no accumulated deposits or contamination; whereas hydrazine emits ammonia
- hydrazine has an I_{sp} of about 230 s; NOFBX was reported to have an I_{sp} of 300 s
- has better energy density, more than three times greater than hydrazine
- is tolerant to a wide thermal range; storable at room temperature on the ground as well as in temperatures found in outer space
- was projected to lower cost compared to existing propulsion systems of comparable performance
- is a monopropellant, which significantly reduces the need for auxiliary hardware, saving cost, volume, and mass for launch systems
- utilizes thrusters that run cooler, reducing thermal design challenges

== Safety concerns ==
A 2008 AIAA paper on the decomposition of nitrous oxide has raised concerns about the safety risks of mixing hydrocarbons with nitrous oxide. By adding hydrocarbons, the energy barrier to an explosive decomposition event is lowered significantly.

== See also ==
- Nitrous oxide
