= 3-aci-nitropropanoate oxidase =

Class of enzymes

Identifiers
- EC no.: 1.7.3.5
- CAS no.: 111940-52-4

Databases
- BRENDA: enzyme data
- ExPASy: NiceZyme view
- KEGG: enzyme entry
- MetaCyc: metabolic pathway
- Rhea: reactions
- PDB structures: RCSB PDB PDBe PDBsum
- Gene Ontology: AmiGO / QuickGO
Search
- PMC: articles
- PubMed: articles
- NCBI: proteins

In enzymology, a 3-aci-nitropropanoate oxidase (EC 1.7.3.5) is an enzyme that catalyzes the chemical reaction

3-aci-nitropropanoate + O_{2} + H_{2}O $\rightleftharpoons$ 3-oxopropanoate + nitrite + H_{2}O_{2}

The 3 substrates of this enzyme are 3-aci-nitropropanoate, O_{2}, and H_{2}O, whereas its 3 products are 3-oxopropanoate, nitrite, and H_{2}O_{2}.

This enzyme belongs to the family of oxidoreductases, specifically those acting on other nitrogenous compounds as donors with oxygen as acceptor. The systematic name of this enzyme class is 3-aci-nitropropanoate:oxygen oxidoreductase. This enzyme is also called propionate-3-nitronate oxidase. It employs one cofactor, FMN.
