= 3-hydroxypropionate dehydrogenase (NADP+) =

Class of enzymes

3-hydroxypropionate dehydrogenase (NADP^{+})

Identifiers
- EC no.: 1.1.1.298

Databases
- IntEnz: IntEnz view
- BRENDA: BRENDA entry
- ExPASy: NiceZyme view
- KEGG: KEGG entry
- MetaCyc: metabolic pathway
- PRIAM: profile
- PDB structures: RCSB PDB PDBe PDBsum
Search
- PMC: articles
- PubMed: articles
- NCBI: proteins

3-hydroxypropionate dehydrogenase (NADP^{+}) (EC 1.1.1.298) is an enzyme with systematic name 3-hydroxypropionate:NADP^{+} oxidoreductase. This enzyme catalyses the following chemical reaction:

3-Hydroxypropionic acid
+ NADP^{+}
H^{+}
H^{+}
3-Oxopropanoic acid
+ NADPH

This enzyme catalyses the reduction of malonate semialdehyde to 3-hydroxypropionate, which is a key step in the 3-hydroxypropionate and the 3-hydroxypropionate/4-hydroxybutyrate cycles, autotrophic CO_{2} fixation pathways found in some green non-sulfur phototrophic bacteria and archaea, respectively. The enzyme from Chloroflexus aurantiacus is bifunctional, and also catalyses the upstream reaction in the pathway, EC 1.2.1.75. Different from EC 1.1.1.59, 3-hydroxypropionate dehydrogenase (NAD^{+}), by cofactor preference.
