= Photodegradation =

Alteration of materials by light

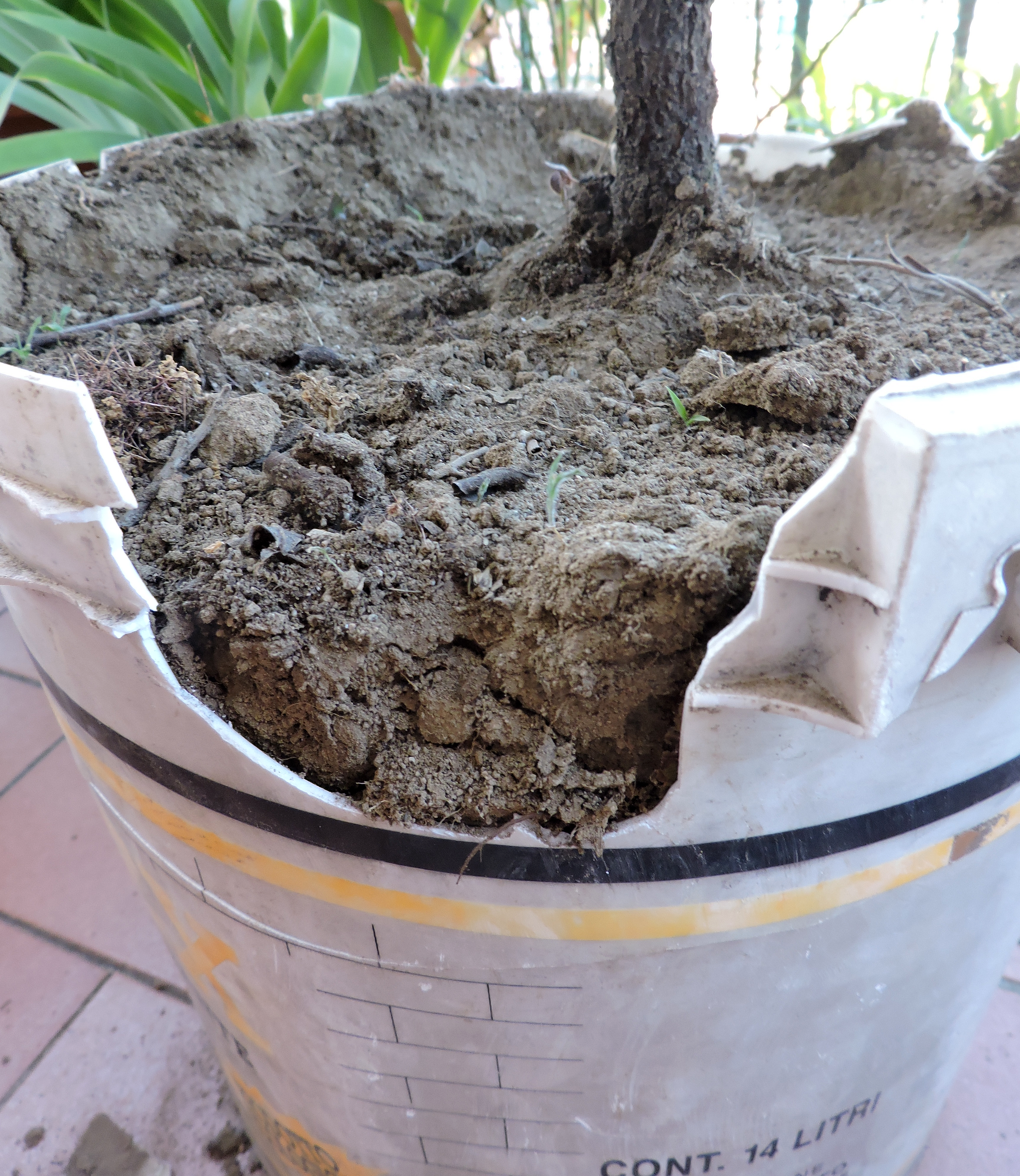
A plastic bucket used as an open-air flowerpot photodegraded after some years.

Photodegradation is the alteration of materials by light. Commonly, the term is used loosely to refer to the combined action of sunlight and air, which cause oxidation and hydrolysis. Often photodegradation is intentionally avoided, since it destroys paintings and other artifacts. It is, however, partly responsible for remineralization of biomass and is used intentionally in some disinfection technologies. Photodegradation does not apply to how materials may be aged or degraded via infrared light or heat, but does include degradation in all of the ultraviolet light wavebands.

== Applications ==
=== Foodstuffs ===
The protection of food from photodegradation is very important. Some nutrients, for example, are affected by degradation when exposed to sunlight. In the case of beer, UV radiation causes a process that entails the degradation of hop bitter compounds to 3-methyl-2-buten-1-thiol and therefore changes the taste. As amber-colored glass has the ability to absorb UV radiation, beer bottles are often made from such glass to prevent this process.

=== Paints, inks, and dyes ===
Paints, inks, and dyes that are organic are more susceptible to photodegradation than those that are not. Ceramics are almost universally colored with non-organic origin materials so as to allow the material to resist photodegradation even under the most relentless conditions, maintaining its color.

=== Pesticides and herbicides ===
The photodegradation of pesticides is of great interest because of the scale of agriculture and the intensive use of chemicals. Pesticides are however selected in part not to photodegrade readily in sunlight in order to allow them to exert their biocidal activity. Thus, more modalities are implemented to enhance their photodegradation, including the use of photosensitizers, photocatalysts (e.g., titanium dioxide), and the addition of reagents such as hydrogen peroxide that would generate hydroxyl radicals that would attack the pesticides.

=== Pharmaceuticals ===
The photodegradation of pharmaceuticals is of interest because they are found in many water supplies. They have deleterious effects on aquatic organisms including toxicity, endocrine disruption, genetic damage. But also in the primary packaging material the photodegradation of pharmaceuticals has to be prevented. For this, amber glasses like Fiolax amber and Corning 51-L are commonly used to protect the pharmaceutical from UV radiations. Iodine (in the form of Lugol's solution) and colloidal silver are universally used in packaging that lets through very little UV light so as to avoid degradation.

=== Polymers ===
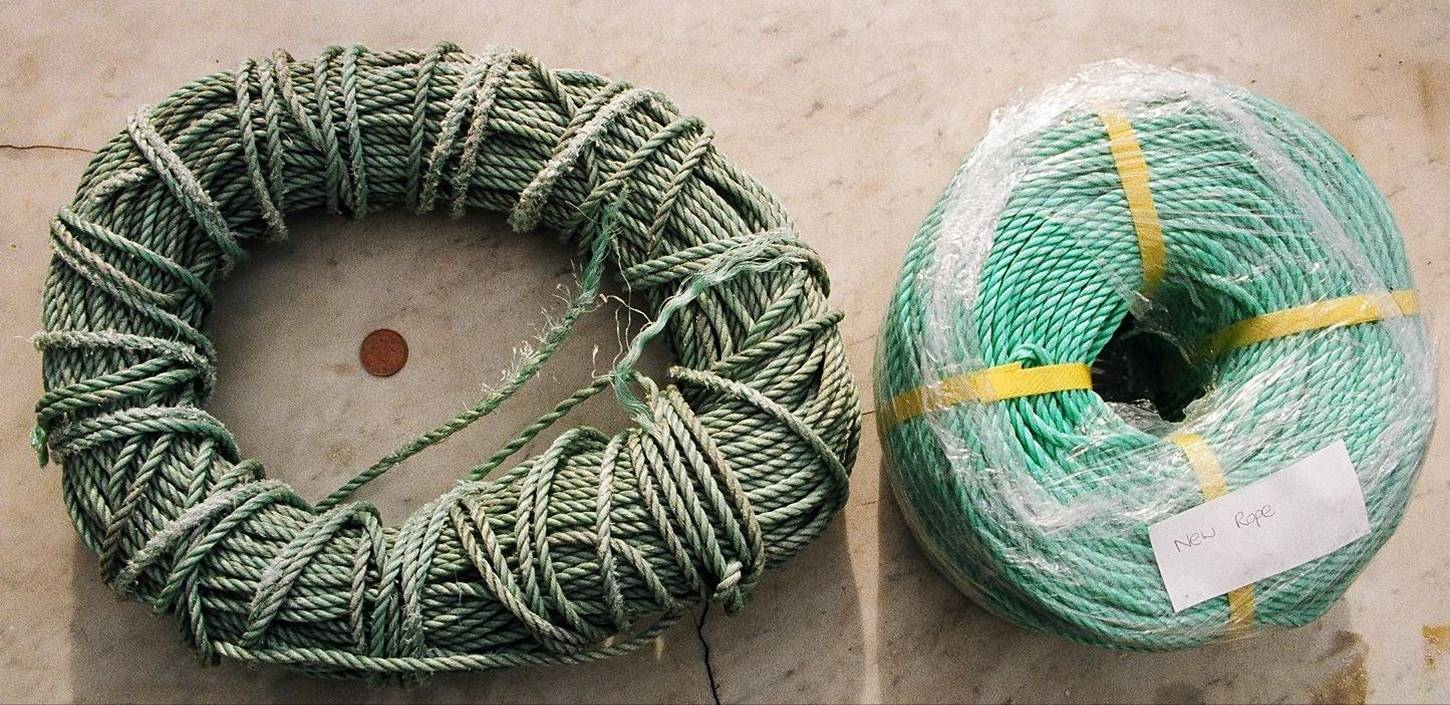
Effect of UV exposure on polypropylene rope

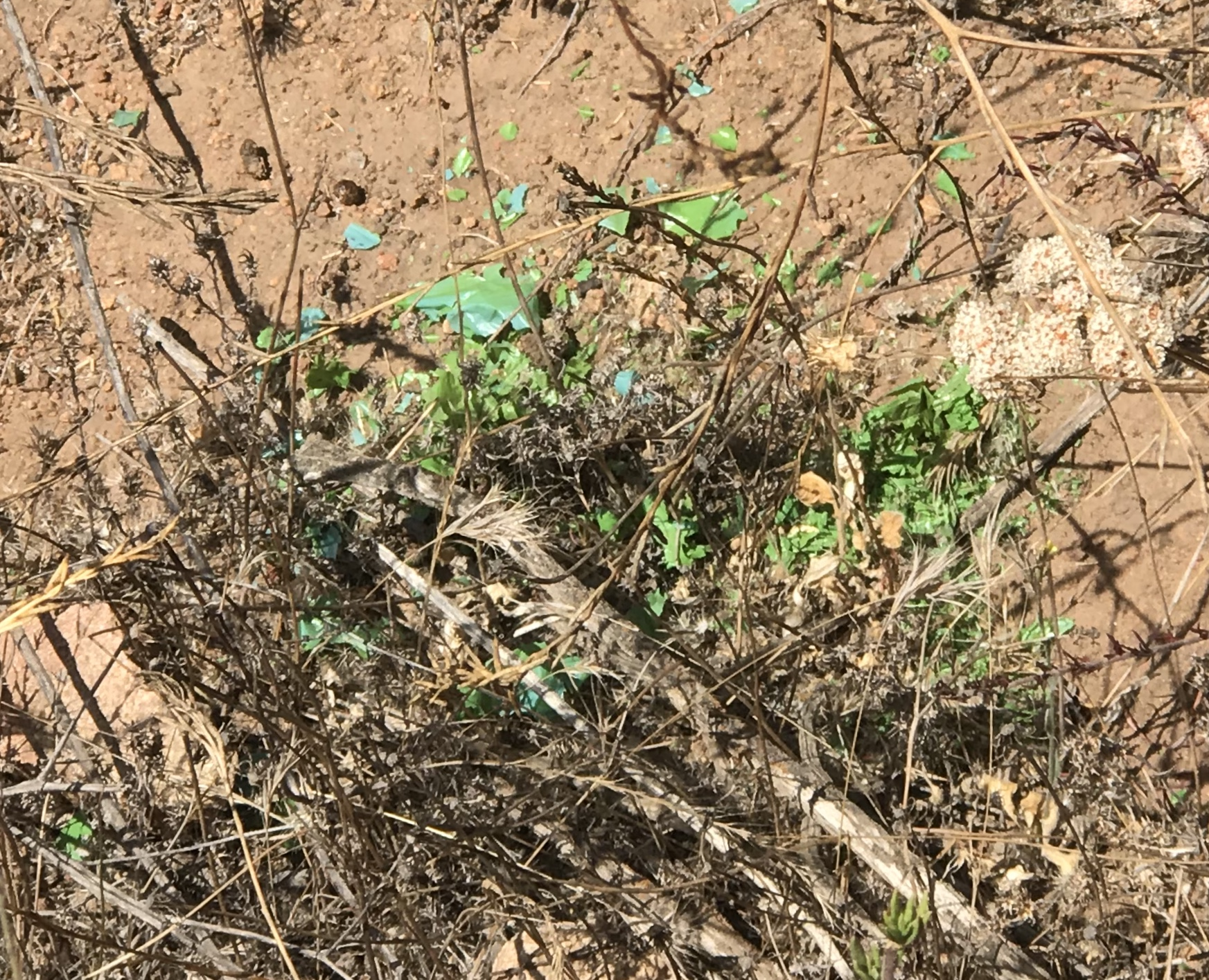
A plastic bag photodegraded into approximately 2,000 pieces, 1 to 25 mm each, after three months' exposure outdoors.

Photodegradation made a plastic straw brittle.

Common synthetic polymers that can be attacked include polypropylene and LDPE, where tertiary carbon bonds in their chain structures are the centres of attack. Ultraviolet rays interact with these bonds to form free radicals, which then react further with oxygen in the atmosphere, producing carbonyl groups in the main chain. The exposed surfaces of products may then discolour and crack, and in extreme cases, complete product disintegration can occur.

In fibre products like rope used in outdoor applications, product life will be low because the outer fibres will be attacked first, and will easily be damaged by abrasion for example. Discolouration of the rope may also occur, thus giving an early warning of the problem.

Polymers which possess UV-absorbing groups such as aromatic rings may also be sensitive to UV degradation. Aramid fibres like Kevlar, for example, are highly UV-sensitive and must be protected from the deleterious effects of sunlight.

== Mechanism ==
Many organic chemicals are thermodynamically unstable in the presence of oxygen; however, their rate of spontaneous oxidation is slow at room temperature. In the language of physical chemistry, such reactions are kinetically limited. This kinetic stability allows the accumulation of complex environmental structures in the environment. Upon the absorption of light, triplet oxygen converts to singlet oxygen, a highly reactive form of the gas, which effects spin-allowed oxidations. In the atmosphere, the organic compounds are degraded by hydroxyl radicals, which are produced from water and ozone.

Photochemical reactions are initiated by the absorption of a photon, typically in the wavelength range 290–700 nm (at the surface of the Earth). The energy of an absorbed photon is transferred to electrons in the molecule and briefly changes their configuration (i.e., promotes the molecule from a ground state to an excited state). The excited state represents what is essentially a new molecule. Often excited state molecules are not kinetically stable in the presence of O_{2} or H_{2}O and can spontaneously decompose (oxidize or hydrolyze). Sometimes molecules decompose to produce high energy, unstable fragments that can react with other molecules around them. The two processes are collectively referred to as direct photolysis or indirect photolysis, and both mechanisms contribute to the removal of pollutants.

The United States federal standard for testing plastic for photodegradation is 40 CFR Ch. I (7–1–03 Edition) PART 238.

== Protection against photodegradation ==
Photodegradation of plastics and other materials can be inhibited with polymer stabilizers, which are widely used. These additives include antioxidants, which interrupt degradation processes. Typical antioxidants are derivatives of aniline. Another type of additive are UV-absorbers. These agents capture the photon and convert it to heat. Typical UV-absorbers are hydroxy-substituted benzophenones, related to the chemicals used in sunscreen. Restoration of yellowed plastic of old toys is nicknamed retrobright.

== See also ==
- Plastic bag
- Polymer degradation
- UV degradation
