= Malonate-semialdehyde dehydrogenase (acetylating) =

malonate-semialdehyde dehydrogenase (acetylating)

Identifiers
- EC no.: 1.2.1.18
- CAS no.: 9028-97-1

Databases
- IntEnz: IntEnz view
- BRENDA: BRENDA entry
- ExPASy: NiceZyme view
- KEGG: KEGG entry
- MetaCyc: metabolic pathway
- PRIAM: profile
- PDB structures: RCSB PDB PDBe PDBsum
- Gene Ontology: AmiGO / QuickGO
Search
- PMC: articles
- PubMed: articles
- NCBI: proteins

In enzymology, malonate-semialdehyde dehydrogenase (acetylating) (EC 1.2.1.18) is an enzyme that catalyzes the chemical reaction

3-Oxopropanoic acid
+ CoA + NAD^{+}
CO_{2} + H^{+}
CO_{2} + H^{+}
Acetyl-CoA
+ NADH

The three substrates of this enzyme are 3-oxopropanoic acid, coenzyme A (CoA), and oxidised nicotinamide adenine dinucleotide (NAD^{+}). Its products are acetyl-CoA, carbon dioxide, reduced NADH, and a proton. This enzyme can use the alternative cofactor, nicotinamide adenine dinucleotide phosphate.

The enzyme belongs to the family of oxidoreductases, specifically those acting on the aldehyde or oxo group of donor with NAD+ or NADP+ as acceptor. The systematic name of this enzyme class is 3-oxopropanoate:NAD(P)+ oxidoreductase (decarboxylating, CoA-acetylating). This enzyme is also called malonic semialdehyde oxidative decarboxylase. This enzyme participates in 4 metabolic pathways: inositol metabolism, alanine and aspartate metabolism, beta-alanine metabolism, and propanoate metabolism.
