= Beta-alanine—pyruvate transaminase =

Enzyme

Beta-alanine-pyruvate transaminase
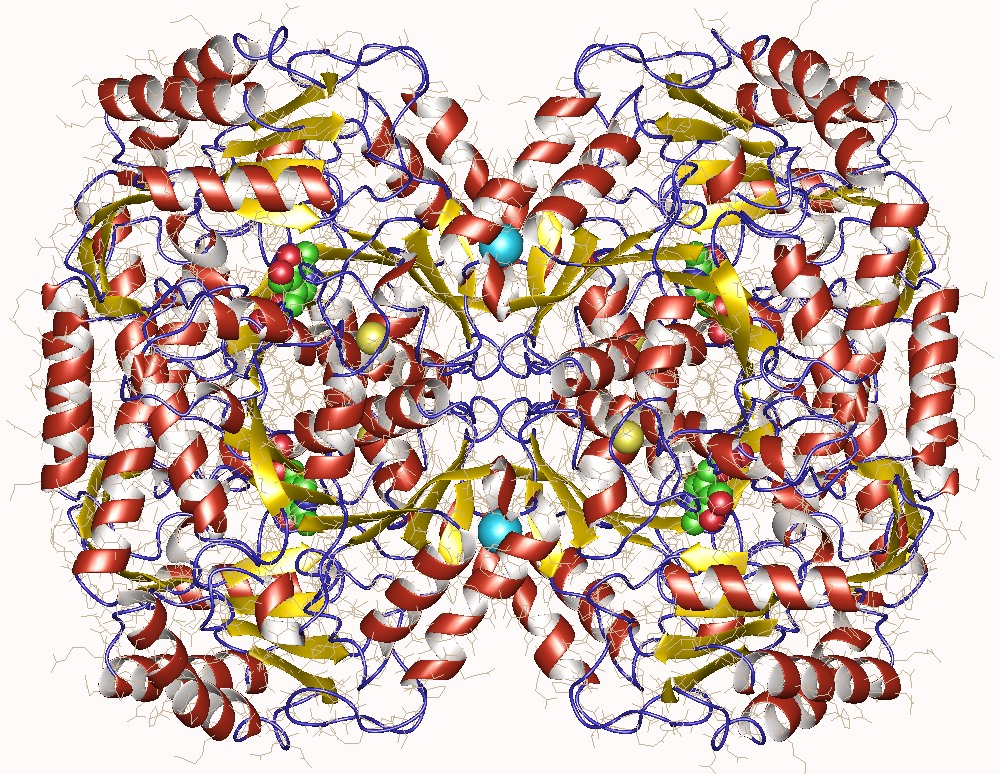
- Beta-alanine-pyruvate transaminase homotetramer, Pseudomonas aeruginosa

Identifiers
- EC no.: 2.6.1.18
- CAS no.: 9030-47-1

Databases
- IntEnz: IntEnz view
- BRENDA: BRENDA entry
- ExPASy: NiceZyme view
- KEGG: KEGG entry
- MetaCyc: metabolic pathway
- PRIAM: profile
- PDB structures: RCSB PDB PDBe PDBsum
- Gene Ontology: AmiGO / QuickGO
Search
- PMC: articles
- PubMed: articles
- NCBI: proteins

Beta-alanine-pyruvate transaminase (EC 2.6.1.18) is an enzyme that catalyzes the reversible chemical reaction

L-alanine
+
3-oxopropanoic acid
pyruvic acid
+
β-alanine

The two substrates of this enzyme first characterised from Pseudomonas fluorescens are L-alanine and 3-oxopropanoic acid. Its products are pyruvic acid and β-alanine.

This enzyme is a transferase, specifically a transaminase, which transfer nitrogenous groups. The systematic name of this enzyme class is L-alanine:3-oxopropanoate aminotransferase. Other names in common use include beta-alanine-pyruvate aminotransferase, and beta-alanine-alpha-alanine transaminase. It participates in four metabolic pathways: alanine and aspartate metabolism, valine, leucine and isoleucine degradation, beta-alanine metabolism, and propanoate metabolism. It uses pyridoxal phosphate as a cofactor.
