= 3-hydroxypropionate dehydrogenase =

Class of enzymes

Identifiers
- EC no.: 1.1.1.59
- CAS no.: 9028-59-5

Databases
- IntEnz: IntEnz view
- BRENDA: BRENDA entry
- ExPASy: NiceZyme view
- KEGG: KEGG entry
- MetaCyc: metabolic pathway
- PRIAM: profile
- PDB structures: RCSB PDB PDBe PDBsum
- Gene Ontology: AmiGO / QuickGO
Search
- PMC: articles
- PubMed: articles
- NCBI: proteins

In enzymology, a 3-hydroxypropionate dehydrogenase (EC 1.1.1.59) is an enzyme that catalyzes the chemical reaction

3-Hydroxypropionic acid
+ NAD^{+}
H^{+}
H^{+}
3-Oxopropanoic acid
+ NADH

The two substrates of this enzyme are 3-hydroxypropionic acid and oxidised nicotinamide adenine dinucleotide (NAD^{+}). Its products are 3-oxopropanoic acid, reduced NADH, and a proton.

This enzyme belongs to the family of oxidoreductases, specifically those acting on the CH-OH group of donor with NAD^{+} or NADP^{+} as acceptor. The systematic name of this enzyme class is 3-hydroxypropanoate:NAD^{+} oxidoreductase. This enzyme participates in beta-alanine metabolism and propanoate metabolism.

== See also ==
- 3-hydroxypropionate dehydrogenase (NADP+) which catalyses the same reaction with an alternative cofactor
