= FOX reagent =

The FOX reagent, or ferrous oxidation−xylenol orange, is used to measure levels of hydrogen peroxide in biological systems. The reagent is incubated with the sample and absorbance of the product form after a series of oxidation reactions is then measured at a wavelength of 560 nm. The reagent itself is an aqueous solution of ferrous ammonium sulfate, sorbitol, sulfuric acid and xylenol orange.

== Use as an assay ==
As an example for one of its uses, the FOX reagent can be an effective assay for the detections of lipid hydroperoxides (LOOHs) in plant tissues from different fruits and vegetables. The FOX assay relies on the oxidation of Fe^{2+} to Fe^{3+} in acidic conditions. After this initial oxidation, the xylenol orange within the assay is also oxidized to produce the product that has the 560 nm absorbance via colorimetric determination. The method itself is practical because of its relative cheapness and because the FOX reagent is not influenced by environmental factors, such as oxygen or light levels. The assay would also allow for the immediate detection of any amount of LOOHs.

With the sensing of LOOHs, the FOX reagent only senses the first products of fatty acid oxidation, and is quite useful prior to the processing of fruits and vegetables. This sensitiveness of the reagent couples well with the rapid detection of the assay. This is advantageous over other assays in which more advanced oxidation would need to proceed in order to be detected by the reagents used for the chosen assay. Recent uses of the assay involve modifications in which the assay can be used to detect the enzyme 5-lipoxygenase, which can be found in insect and human cells. Modifying the assay can also aid in the detection of protein, as well as lipid, hydroperoxide in human cells. Aside from its use in vegetation, the FOX assay has also been used to detect the LOOHs present within animal tissue. Specifically, it can be used in order to detect fatty acid oxidation in poultry, such as cooked and uncooked chicken. Since lipid oxidation in chicken tissue may result in the build up of toxins and the loss of flavor, early detection via the FOX assay would allow proper evaluation of the quality of meat produced.
