= Malonyl CoA reductase (malonate semialdehyde-forming) =

Identifiers
- EC no.: 1.2.1.75

Databases
- IntEnz: IntEnz view
- BRENDA: BRENDA entry
- ExPASy: NiceZyme view
- KEGG: KEGG entry
- MetaCyc: metabolic pathway
- PRIAM: profile
- PDB structures: RCSB PDB PDBe PDBsum
Search
- PMC: articles
- PubMed: articles
- NCBI: proteins

Malonyl CoA reductase (malonate semialdehyde-forming) (EC 1.2.1.75, NADP-dependent malonyl CoA reductase, malonyl CoA reductase (NADP)) is an enzyme with systematic name malonate semialdehyde:NADP^{+} oxidoreductase (malonate semialdehyde-forming). This enzyme catalyse the following chemical reaction

3-Oxopropanoic acid
+ Coenzyme A + NADP^{+}
H^{+}
H^{+}
Malonyl-CoA
+ NADPH

The enzyme requires Mg^{2+}. It catalyses the reduction of malonyl-CoA to malonate semialdehyde.
