= 2,3-Dioxopropanoic acid =

2,3-dioxopropanoic acid

Names
- Other names: mesoxalic semialdehyde; mesoxalaldehydic acid; dioxopropionic acid

Identifiers
CAS Number	815-53-2
3D model (JSmol)	Interactive image
ChemSpider	3070187
PubChem CID	3844765
CompTox Dashboard (EPA)	DTXSID1021588
- InChI: InChI=1S/C3H2O4/c4-1-2(5)3(6)7/h1H,(H,6,7) Key: JSCNFEFJALUGBY-UHFFFAOYSA-N
- SMILES: O=CC(=O)C(=O)O

Properties
Chemical formula	C_{3}H_{2}O_{4}
Molar mass	102.045 g·mol^{−1}
Melting point	214 °C (417 °F; 487 K)

Related compounds
Related compounds	3-Oxopropanoic acid; propanoic acid; 2-methylpropanoic acid
- Except where otherwise noted, data are given for materials in their standard state (at 25 °C [77 °F], 100 kPa). Infobox references

2,3-Dioxopropanoic acid is an organic chemical compound with the molecular formula C_{3}H_{2}O_{4} and a structural formula of O=C(O)C(C=O)=O. The compound is also known as mesoxalic aldehyde or formylglyoxylic acid. This is a highly oxidized, three-carbon carboxylic acid featuring two keto groups: aldehyde at C_{3} and ketone at C_{2}.
