= Retrobright =

Process for removing yellowing from ABS plastic

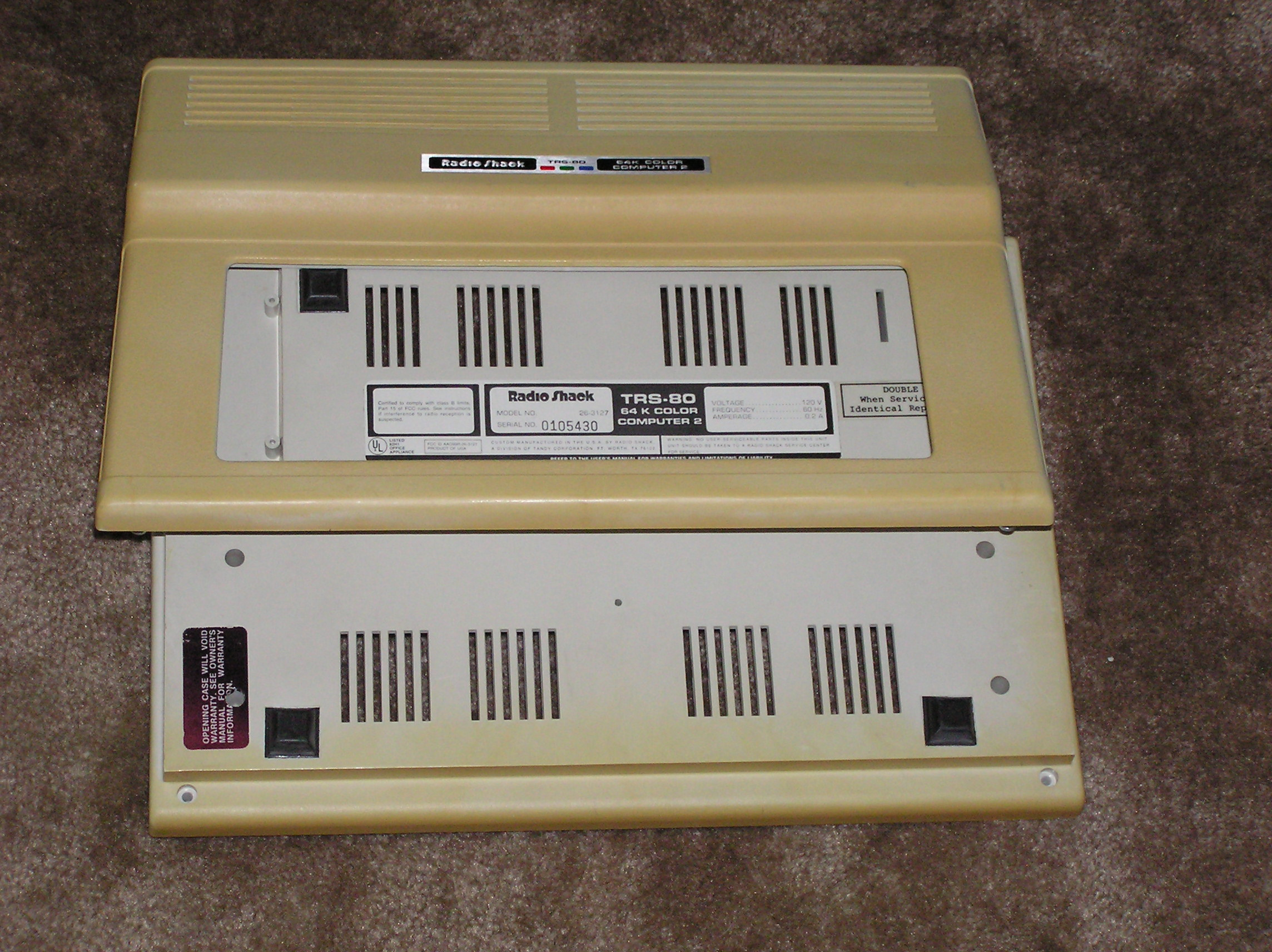
A TRS-80 Color Computer showing significant yellowing

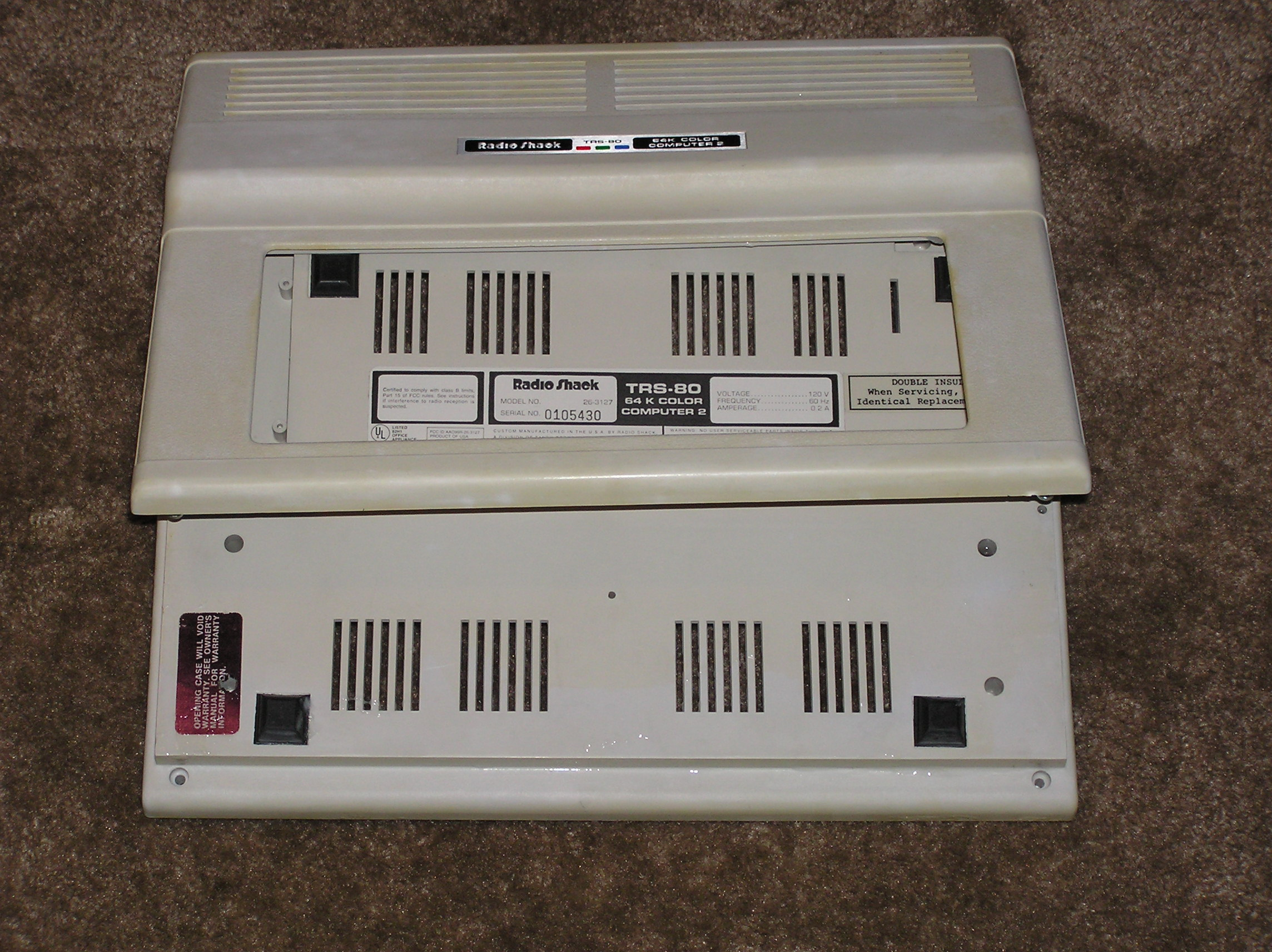
The same computer after treatment, showing yellowing largely reversed

Retrobright (stylized as retr0bright or retrobrite) is a hydrogen peroxide–based process for removing yellowing from ABS plastics.

Yellowing in ABS (acrylonitrile butadiene styrene) plastic occurs when it is exposed to ultraviolet light or excessive heat, which causes photo-oxidation of polymers that breaks polymer chains and causes the plastic to yellow and become brittle.

== Composition ==
Retrobright consists of hydrogen peroxide, a small amount of TAED (tetraacetylethylenediamine; often advertised as an "active oxygen" laundry booster) as a catalyst, and a source of ultraviolet (UV) light. The yellowed plastic is covered in the solution and then exposed to the UV light for up to several hours or days. Xanthan gum or arrowroot can be added to the solution, creating an easier-to-apply gel. Hydrogen peroxide–based hair bleaching creams are often used in favor of household hydrogen peroxide because the creams are available in higher concentrations (9 to 12 percent) and are viscous, allowing them to be applied with less waste, especially to large pieces.

== History ==
The use of hydrogen peroxide on yellowed household plastics had been known as a home repair method as early as the 1960s. It did not gain currency among hobbyists and collectors until the late 2000s, when a number vintage computing enthusiasts developed a formula involving hydrogen peroxide through discussion on message boards. In March 2008, the proprietors of a German computer museum, CBM Museum Wuppertal, published online their success story of submerging yellowed computer case parts in hydrogen peroxide for five days. This news was initially celebrated by the Amiga community in Germany and eventually trickled to the English Amiga Board, where a number of chemist users including Dave Stevenson refined the process further over the summer of 2008, adding TAED to the formula while emphasizing the role of UV light. The term retr0bright was coined during this period.

== Alternatives ==
Sodium percarbonate may also be used by dissolving it in water and following the usual steps for hydrogen peroxide, as it is sodium carbonate and hydrogen peroxide in a crystalline form.

Ozone gas can also be used for retrobrighting, as long as an ozone generator, a suitable container of sufficient size, and a source of UV are available.

A sous-vide method has also been developed, using an immersion circulator (commonly used for sous-vide cooking) to heat a solution of hair bleaching cream and water. This heated solution is then applied to the yellowed plastic. This process is said to be more effective by some users.

A simpler but slower process involves merely exposing the yellowed plastic to bright sunlight.

== Effectiveness ==
The long-term effectiveness of these techniques is unclear. Some have discovered the yellowing reappears, and there are concerns that the process weakens and only bleaches the already damaged plastic. For example, in a 10-year study conducted by Shelby Jueden of the YouTube channel Tech Tangents, a yellowed Dreamcast case (manufactured around 1999) received the standard retrobright treatment of hydrogen peroxide and UV light in 2015. Instead of retrobrighting all surfaces of the case, Jueden covered up portions of the bottom half with tape so that they did not receive any hydrogen peroxide and UV. Upon re-evaluating the case in 2025, Jueden observed that the treated surfaces exhibited significant yellowing, as well as other blemishes such as streaking and blotching, that the untreated surfaces lacked. Jueden concluded that untreated ABS maintains better color consistency over time. He also concluded that retrobrighting acts only as a temporary fix and that all methods may cause irreversible damage to the appearance of ABS plastic.

== Similar processes ==
The usage has also expanded to other restoration applications, such as classic and collectible sneakers and collectible toys.

== See also ==
- Beige box
- Photodegradation
