= Branched-chain-fatty-acid kinase =

Class of enzymes

branched-chain fatty acid kinase

Identifiers
- EC no.: 2.7.2.14
- CAS no.: 84177-54-8

Databases
- IntEnz: IntEnz view
- BRENDA: BRENDA entry
- ExPASy: NiceZyme view
- KEGG: KEGG entry
- MetaCyc: metabolic pathway
- PRIAM: profile
- PDB structures: RCSB PDB PDBe PDBsum
- Gene Ontology: AmiGO / QuickGO
Search
- PMC: articles
- PubMed: articles
- NCBI: proteins

In enzymology, a branched-chain-fatty-acid kinase (EC 2.7.2.14) is an enzyme that catalyzes the chemical reaction

ATP + 2-methylpropanoate $\rightleftharpoons$ ADP + 2-methylpropanoyl phosphate

Thus, the two substrates of this enzyme are ATP and 2-methylpropanoate, whereas its two products are ADP and 2-methylpropanoyl phosphate.

This enzyme belongs to the family of transferases, specifically those transferring phosphorus-containing groups (phosphotransferases) with a carboxy group as acceptor. The systematic name of this enzyme class is ATP:branched-chain-fatty-acid 1-phosphotransferase. This enzyme is also called isobutyrate kinase.
