= Isobutyric acid =

Carboxylic acid with chemical formula (CH3)2CHCO2H

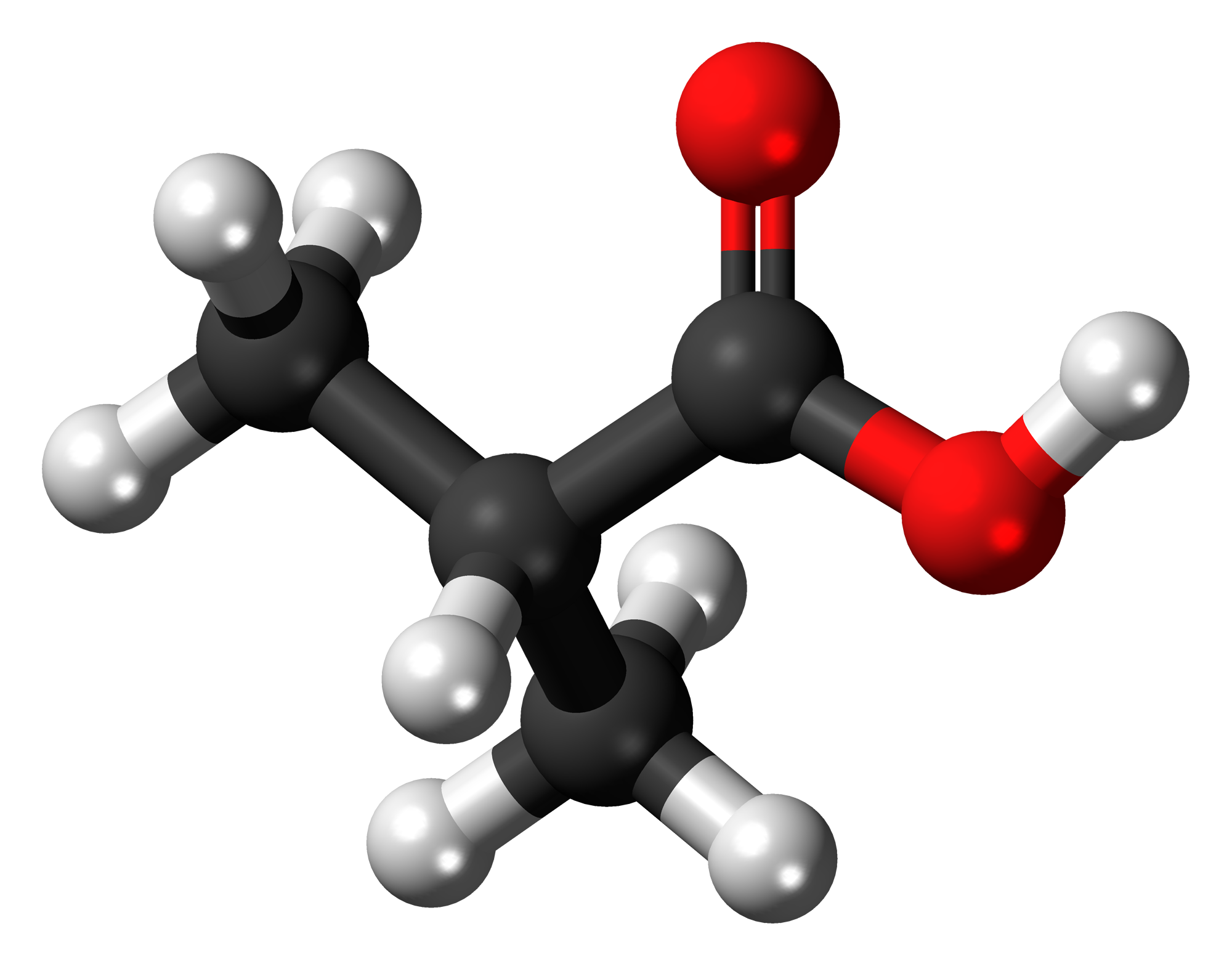

Names
- Preferred IUPAC name 2-Methylpropanoic acid
- Other names Isobutyric acid 2-Methylpropionic acid Isobutanoic acid

Identifiers
CAS Number	79-31-2
3D model (JSmol)	Interactive image
ChEBI	CHEBI:16135
ChEMBL	ChEMBL108778
ChemSpider	6341
DrugBank	DB02531
ECHA InfoCard	100.001.087
EC Number	201-195-7
IUPHAR/BPS	1060
KEGG	C02632
PubChem CID	6590
RTECS number	NQ4375000
UNII	8LL210O1U0
UN number	2529
CompTox Dashboard (EPA)	DTXSID4021636
- InChI: InChI=1S/C4H8O2/c1-3(2)4(5)6/h3H,1-2H3,(H,5,6) Key: KQNPFQTWMSNSAP-UHFFFAOYSA-N; InChI=1/C4H8O2/c1-3(2)4(5)6/h3H,1-2H3,(H,5,6) Key: KQNPFQTWMSNSAP-UHFFFAOYAB
- SMILES: O=C(O)C(C)C

Properties
Chemical formula	C_{4}H_{8}O_{2}
Molar mass	88.106 g·mol^{−1}
Density	0.9697 g/cm^{3} (0 °C)
Melting point	−47 °C (−53 °F; 226 K)
Boiling point	155 °C (311 °F; 428 K)
Acidity (pK_{a})	4.86
Magnetic susceptibility (χ)	−56.06×10^{−6} cm^{3}/mol

Hazards
- GHS labelling
Pictograms	(GHS02: Flammable) (GHS05: Corrosive) (GHS06: Toxic)
Signal word	Danger
Hazard statements	H226, H302, H311, H314
Precautionary statements	P210, P280, P301+P312+P330, P303+P361+P353, P305+P351+P338+P310
NFPA 704 (fire diamond)	3 2 0
Flash point	55 °C (131 °F; 328 K)

Related compounds
Related compounds	2,3-dioxopropanoic acid; propanoic acid
- Except where otherwise noted, data are given for materials in their standard state (at 25 °C [77 °F], 100 kPa). Infobox references

Isobutyric acid, also known as 2-methylpropanoic acid or isobutanoic acid, is a carboxylic acid with structural formula (CH_{3})_{2}CHCOOH. It is an isomer of butyric acid. It is classified as a short-chain fatty acid. Deprotonation or esterification gives derivatives called isobutyrates.

Isobutyric acid is a colorless liquid with a somewhat unpleasant odor. It is soluble in water and organic solvents. It is found naturally in carobs (Ceratonia siliqua), in vanilla, and in the root of Arnica dulcis, and as an ethyl ester in croton oil.

== Production ==
Isobutyric acid is manufactured by the oxidation of isobutyraldehyde, which is a byproduct of the hydroformylation of propylene.

It can also be prepared by the high pressure hydrocarboxylation (Koch reaction) from propylene:

CH_{3}CH=CH_{2} + CO + H_{2}O → (CH_{3})_{2}CHCO_{2}H

Isobutyric acid can also be manufactured commercially using engineered bacteria with a sugar feedstock.

=== Laboratory methods ===
Many routes are known including the hydrolysis of isobutyronitrile with alkalis and the oxidation of isobutanol with potassium dichromate in the presence of sulfuric acid. In the presence of proton donors, the action of sodium amalgam on methacrylic acid also gives isobutyric acid.

== Reactions ==
The acid reacts as a typical carboxylic acid: it can form amide, ester, anhydride, and chloride derivatives. Its acid chloride is commonly used as the intermediate to obtain the others. When heated with a chromic acid solution it is oxidized to acetone. Alkaline potassium permanganate oxidizes it to α-hydroxyisobutyric acid, (CH_{3})_{2}C(OH)-CO_{2}H.

== Uses ==
Isobutyric acid and its volatile esters are present naturally in a wide variety of foods and, at varying concentrations, can impart a range of flavors. The compound's safety as a food additive was reviewed by an FAO and WHO panel, who concluded that there were no concerns at the likely levels of intake.

== Biology ==
In humans, isobutyric acid is a minor product of the gut microbiome and can also be produced by metabolism of its esters found in food. It has a characteristic odor like rancid butter (4-carbon organic compounds take the root, butyl, which is in turn from butyric which is in turn from the Latin word for butter and the Greek, βούτυρον) but anosmia for it has been reported in about 2.5% of people.

The metabolism of isobutyric acid in plants has been studied.

Isobutyric acid, along with several other short-chain fatty acids collectively known as "copulins," is found abundantly in human vaginal secretions. Levels of isobutyric acid fluctuate throughout the menstrual cycle, and it is hypothesized to act as an indicator of ovulatory status. Similar cycles are observed in chimpanzees.

== See also ==
- Sucrose acetate isobutyrate
