= 3-Oxopropanoic acid =

Names
- Preferred IUPAC name 3-Oxopropanoic acid
- Other names malonic semialdehyde, formylacetic acid, 3-oxopropanoate

Identifiers
CAS Number	926-61-4
3D model (JSmol)	Interactive image
Beilstein Reference	1741700
ChEBI	CHEBI:17960
ChemSpider	845
Gmelin Reference	164397
KEGG	C00222
PubChem CID	868
UNII	9K1T0U0R4C
CompTox Dashboard (EPA)	DTXSID90239064
- InChI: InChI=1S/C3H3O3/c4-2-1-3(5)6/h1H2,(H,5,6)/q-1 Key: HBHVBGOPNWLCDZ-UHFFFAOYSA-N
- SMILES: C([C-]=O)C(=O)O

Properties
Chemical formula	C_{3}H_{4}O_{3}
Molar mass	88.062 g·mol^{−1}
Density	1.258 g/cm^{3}
Boiling point	237.3 °C (459.1 °F; 510.4 K)

Hazards
- GHS labelling
Pictograms	(GHS07: Exclamation mark)
Signal word	Warning
Flash point	111.6 °C

Related compounds
Related compounds	2,3-dioxopropanoic acid; propanoic acid; 2-methylpropanoic acid
- Except where otherwise noted, data are given for materials in their standard state (at 25 °C [77 °F], 100 kPa). Infobox references

3-Oxopropanoic acid (also malonic semialdehyde or formylacetic acid) is an organic chemical compound that carries both a carboxylic acid function and an aldehyde function.

== Natural occurrence ==
In nature, 3-oxopropanoic acid occurs as a metabolic intermediate. It is formed, for example, by the reversible oxidation of 3-hydroxypropionyl-CoA with nicotinamide adenine dinucleotide (NAD).

A bacterial strain of the species Pseudomonas fluorescens is known to survive on propiolic acid as its sole carbon and energy source. 3-Oxopropanoic acid is an important metabolic intermediate: it is formed by hydration of acetylenic acid and is converted into acetyl-CoA by decarboxylation. It also occurs as a metabolic intermediate in a strain of Escherichia coli that can grow on uracil as its sole nitrogen source.

3-Oxopropanoic acid also occurs in atmospheric aerosols along with various other organic acids (especially oxalic acid). It has been detected as an aerosol component at various stations during a circumnavigation of the globe by ship. The compound has also been found in aerosol analyses in the Arctic, the North Pacific, India, and Tokyo.

== Synthesis ==
3-Oxopropanoic acid is highly reactive. It is often generated in situ by reacting malic acid with concentrated sulfuric acid. This process releases formic acid, water, and carbon monoxide.

A readily storable precursor to the compound is ethyl 3-oxopropionate diethyl acetal. This can be prepared by condensation of ethyl acetate and ethyl formate, followed by acetalization with hydrogen chloride in absolute ethanol. The 3-oxopropanoic acid can also be obtained from it by hydrolysis with dilute sulfuric acid followed by neutralization.

== Reactions ==
Reaction with a phenol yields coumarin. The enol form, which is initially formed during the preparation from malic acid and sulfuric acid, can condense with urea to form uracil.

Isocytosine was prepared analogously, using guanidine hydrochloride instead of urea.
