= Star sapphire =

Star sapphire or Star Sapphire may refer to:

- Star sapphire, a type of sapphire gemstone that exhibits a star-like reflection of light (an asterism)
- The Armstrong Siddeley Star Sapphire, a British car manufactured from 1958 to 1960
- Star Sapphire (DC Comics character), the name of several supervillains in DC Comics publications
- Star Sapphire, a fictional character from the Touhou Project series of video games
