= Armstrong Siddeley Cougar =

Cougar
- Type: Radial engine
- National origin: United Kingdom
- Manufacturer: Armstrong Siddeley
- First run: 1945

The Armstrong Siddeley Cougar was an aero engine developed by Armstrong Siddeley in 1945. The design was a departure from earlier Armstrong Siddeley engines in many ways, as the company's only nine-cylinder radial design. Although the engine was tested, it did not find an aircraft application and did not see production.

== Specifications (Cougar) ==
Data from Flightglobal Archive.

=== General characteristics ===
- Type: 9-cylinder single-row air-cooled radial engine
- Bore: 5.5 in (140 mm)
- Stroke: 5.5 in (140 mm)
- Displacement: 1,176 cu in (19 L)
- Length: 51.5 in (1,308 mm)
- Diameter: 49.5 in (1,257 mm)
- Dry weight: 1,020 lb (463 kg)

=== Components ===
- Valvetrain: Overhead valve operated by pushrods
- Supercharger: 1 stage gear driven 8.17:1 supercharger
- Fuel system: R.A.E.-Hobson AS/C2 fuel injection to supercharger with automatic boost control
- Fuel type: 100/130 aviation petrol
- Oil system: Pressure fed at 80 psi (5.5 bar), dry sump.
- Cooling system: Air-cooled

=== Performance ===
- Power output:
- (Take-off) 850 hp (634 kW) at 2,800 rpm at 46.0 inHg / +8.0Lb boost for 15 minutes
- (Maximum) 730 hp (544 kW) at 2,700 rpm at 7,500 ft (2,290 m)
- (Normal) 690 hp (515 kW) at 2,500 rpm at 6,000 ft (1,830 m)
- (Cruising) 500 hp (373 kW) at 2,300 pm at 10,500 ft (3,200 m)
- Specific power: 0.76 hp/(cu in) (34.6 kW/L)
- Compression ratio: 6.3:1
- Specific fuel consumption: 0.46 lb/(hp h) (0.011 kg/(kW h))
- Oil consumption: 0.012 lb/(hp h) (0.005 kg/(kW h))
- Power-to-weight ratio: 0.83 hp/lb (1.37 kW/kg)

== See also ==
Related lists

- List of aircraft engines
