= Armstrong Siddeley =

Former British engineering group

- Industry: Motor cars Aircraft engines Light engineering
- Founded: 1919
- Defunct: 1960
- Fate: Merged with Hawker Aircraft (1935) became Hawker Siddeley Merged with Bristol Aero Engines (1960) became Bristol Siddeley Merged with Rolls-Royce (1966)
- Successor: Armstrong Siddeley Owners Club Ltd
- Headquarters: Coventry, England
- Key people: John Davenport Siddeley
- Parent: Armstrong Whitworth (1919–27)
- Subsidiaries: Armstrong Whitworth Aircraft (1927–35)

Armstrong Siddeley was a British engineering group that operated during the first half of the 20th century. It was founded in 1919 and is best known for the production of luxury vehicles and aircraft engines.

The company was created following Armstrong Whitworth 's purchase of Siddeley-Deasy, a manufacturer of luxury motor cars marketed to the top echelon of society. After the merger of companies, this focus on quality continued throughout in the production of cars, aircraft engines, gearboxes for tanks and buses, rocket and torpedo motors, and the development of railcars. Company mergers and takeovers with Hawker Aviation and Bristol Aero Engines enabled the continuation of car production, which had ceased in August 1960.

The company was absorbed into the Rolls-Royce conglomerate, which was interested in the aircraft and aircraft engine business. Eventually, the remaining spares and all motor car interests were sold to the Armstrong Siddeley Owners Club Ltd, which now owns the patents, designs, copyrights, and trademarks, including the name Armstrong Siddeley.

Considered "an elegant car appropriate for royal use", the "Armstrong Siddeley Saloon" was used by the Prince of Wales (later King Edward VIII) during his 1930 tour of Uganda.

== History ==
=== Siddeley Autocar ===
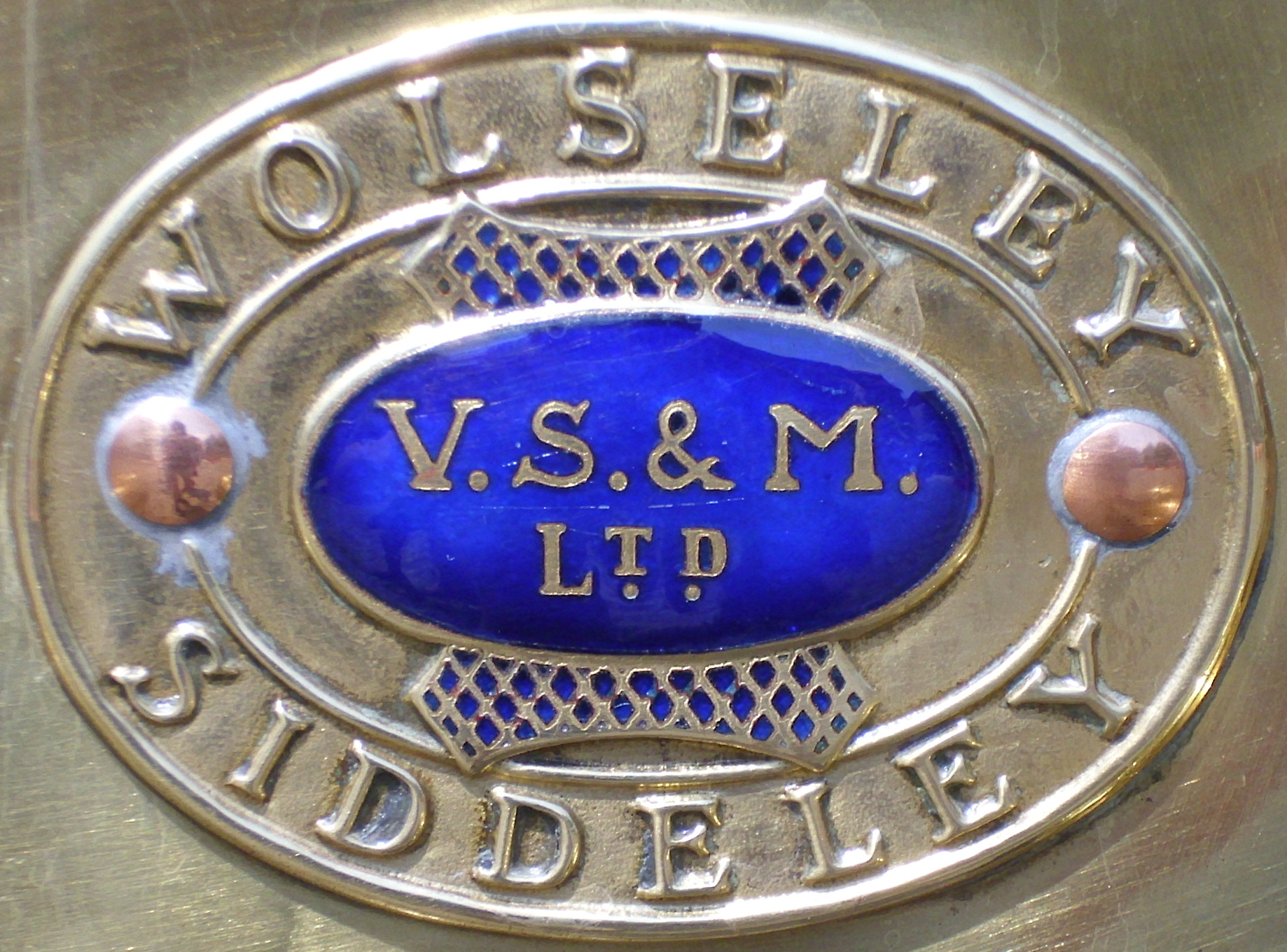
Name plate: Vickers, Sons & Maxim — Wolseley Siddeley

The Siddeley Autocar Company, of Coventry, was founded by John Davenport Siddeley (1866–1953) in 1902. Its products, made for him by a Vickers subsidiary, were heavily based on Peugeots using many Peugeot parts and fitted with English-built bodies. J. D. Siddeley was appointed London sales manager of Vickers Limited's subsidiary Wolseley in early 1905 at the same time as Wolseley purchased the goodwill and patent rights of his Siddeley car. (Note: "The Wolseley Tool and Motor-Car Company Limited has absorbed the Siddeley Autocar Company Limited and has acquired Niagara Westminster for premises for a London office and garage. The two companies have long been associated, the Siddeley cars being made by the Wolseley company." The Times, Monday, 13 Feb 1905; pg. 9; Issue 3762) A few months later Herbert Austin left to form his own business and Siddeley was appointed general manager.

Without the consent of the Vickers brothers Siddeley added his own name to the Wolseley nameplate but it was dropped on his departure.

=== Siddeley-Deasy ===
In 1909, J. D. Siddeley resigned from Wolseley and in 1910, he took on management of The Deasy Motor Car Manufacturing Company, Limited. The shareholders were so pleased with his success in that post that on 7 November 1912 they unanimously agreed to change the company's name to The Siddeley-Deasy Motor Car Company Limited. Siddeley's name had been added to the product's radiator earlier in 1912. His cars began to use the slogan "As silent as the Sphinx", sporting a Sphinx as a bonnet mascot.

=== Armstrong Siddeley ===
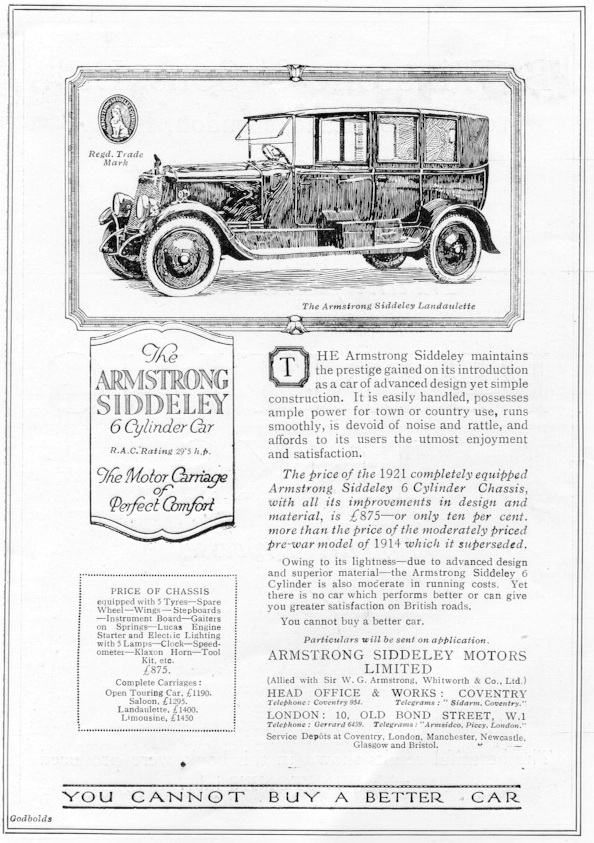
1921 5-litre 30hp Landaulette Advert

In April 1919, Siddeley-Deasy was bought out by Armstrong Whitworth Development Company of Newcastle upon Tyne and in May 1919 became Armstrong Siddeley Motors Ltd, a subsidiary with J. D. Siddeley as managing director. In 1927, Armstrong Whitworth merged its heavy engineering interests with Vickers to form Vickers-Armstrongs. At this point, J. D. Siddeley brought Armstrong Siddeley and Armstrong Whitworth Aircraft into his control. In 1928, Armstrong Siddeley Holdings bought Avro from Crossley Motors. Also that year Siddeley partnered with Walter Gordon Wilson, inventor of the pre-selector gearbox, to create Improved Gears Ltd, which later became Self-Changing Gears – the gearbox that should be credited with enabling the marketing tagline "Cars for the daughters of gentlemen".

Armstrong Siddeley manufactured luxury cars, aircraft engines, and later, aircraft. In 1935, J. D. Siddeley's interests were purchased for £2 million by aviation pioneer Tommy Sopwith, owner of Hawker Aircraft, to form – along with the Gloster Aircraft Company and Air Training Services – Hawker Siddeley, a famous name in British aircraft production. Armstrong Whitworth Aircraft and Armstrong Siddeley Motors became subsidiaries of Hawker Siddeley, with Sopwith himself becoming the new chairman of Armstrong Siddeley Motors. At this time, there remained an "unbroken business association" between the Siddeley family and the Middleton-Joy family who were manufactures of Filtrate Oil and had enjoyed considerable success in car-racing rallies.

Armstrong Siddeley was merged with the aircraft engine business of Bristol Aeroplane Company (Bristol Aero Engines) to form Bristol Siddeley as part of an ongoing rationalisation under government influence of the British aircraft and aircraft engine manufacturers. Armstrong Siddeley produced their last cars in 1960. Bristol Siddeley and Rolls-Royce merged in 1966, the latter subsuming the former which remained for a while as an aircraft engine division within Rolls-Royce.

In June 1972, Rolls-Royce (1972) Ltd sold all the stock of spares plus all patents, specifications, drawings, catalogues and the name of Armstrong Siddeley Motors Ltd to the Armstrong Siddeley Owners Club Ltd. This meant that "Armstrong Siddeley" and "A-S Sphinx Logo" are trademarks and copyright of the Armstrong Siddeley Owners Club Ltd.

The "Siddeley" name survived a while longer in aviation, through Hawker Siddeley Aviation and Hawker Siddeley Dynamics. In 1977 they joined with others to become British Aerospace (BAe) which with further mergers is now BAE Systems.

== Products ==
=== Motor cars ===
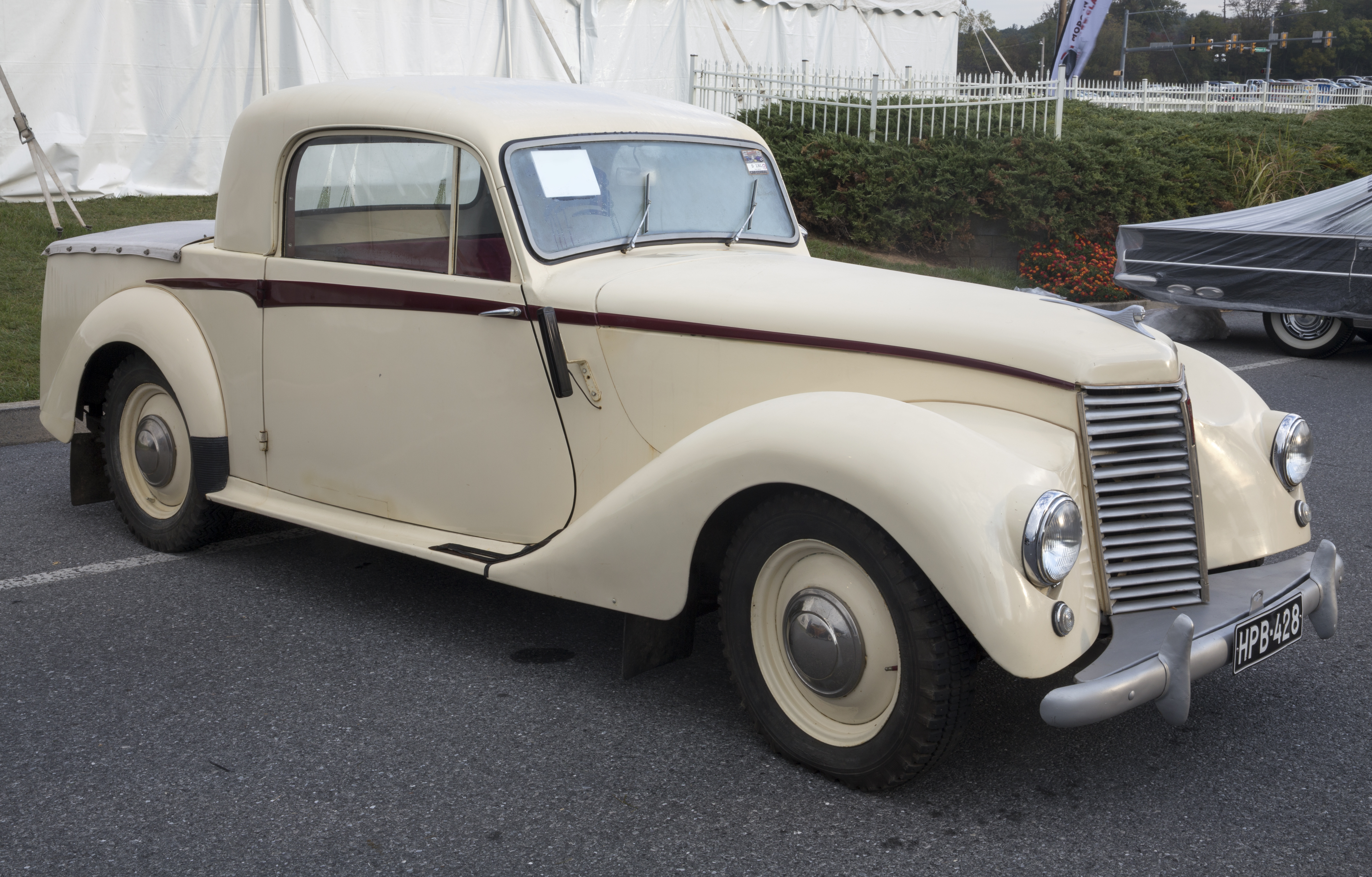
Coupé utility for the postwar export drive

The first car produced from the union was a fairly massive machine, a 5-litre 30 hp. A smaller 18 hp appeared in 1922 and a 2-litre 14 hp was introduced in 1923. 1928 saw the company's first 15 hp six; 1929 saw the introduction of a 12 hp vehicle. This was a pioneering year for the marque, during which it first offered the Wilson preselector gearbox as an optional extra; it became standard issue on all cars from 1933. In 1930 the company marketed four models, of 12, 15, 20, and 30 hp, the last costing £1450.

The company's rather staid image was endorsed during the 1930s by the introduction of a range of six-cylinder cars with ohv engines, though a four-cylinder 12 hp was kept in production until 1936.

In 1932 - or thereabouts, a line of special, rather more sporty designs was started which resulted in the Rally Tourer series. The aim was to help shake off the somewhat pedestrian image of what was in fact a rather advanced product. Of the 16 rally tourers built, many were used by the owners or senior directors, and were entered into various rallies, achieving some good results and making for good publicity. Only one of those 16 special cars is now known to exist: a 1933, Long-15 Rally Tourer which, according to the records, shared the same body as the 20 hp version (which had a slightly longer bonnet).

In 1933, the 5-litre six-cylinder Siddeley Special was announced, featuring a Hiduminium aluminium alloy engine; this model cost £950. Car production continued at a reduced rate throughout 1940, and a few were assembled in 1941.

The week that World War II ended in Europe, Armstrong Siddeley introduced its first post-war models; these were the Lancaster four-door saloon and the Hurricane drophead coupe. The names of these models echoed the names of aircraft produced by the Hawker Siddeley Group (the name adopted by the company in 1935) during the war. These cars all used a 2-litre six-cylinder (16 hp) engines, increased to 2.3-litre (18 hp) engines in 1949. From 1949 to 1952 two commercial variants of the 18 hp Whitleys were produced, primarily for export. The Utility Coupé was a conventional coupe utility style vehicle, while the Station Coupé was effectively a dual cab vehicle, although it still retained only two doors. However, it did have two rows of seating to accommodate up to four adults and the doors were larger to allow better access to the rear. From 1953 the company produced the Sapphire, with a 3.4-litre six-cylinder engine.

In 1956, the model range was expanded with the addition of the 234 (a 2.3-litre four-cylinder) and the 236 (with the older 2.3-litre six-cylinder engine). The Sapphire 346 sported a bonnet mascot in the shape of a sphinx with namesake Armstrong Siddeley Sapphire jet engines attached. The 234 and 236 Sapphires might have looked to some of marque's loyal customers like a radical departure from the traditional Armstrong Siddeley appearance. However, in truth, they were simply too conservative in a period of rapidly developing automotive design. If the "baby Sapphire" heralded the beginning of the end for Armstrong Siddeley, it was because Jaguar had launched the unitary-construction 2.4 saloon in 1955, which was quicker, significantly cheaper, and much better-looking than the 234 and 236.

The last new model produced by Armstrong Siddeley was 1958's Star Sapphire, with a 4-litre engine, and automatic transmission. The Armstrong Siddeley was a casualty of the 1960 merger with Bristol; the last car left the Coventry factory in 1960.

==== Armstrong Siddeley Truck ====
- The Armstrong Siddeley Four Wheel Drive Vehicles

==== Model list ====
Cars produced by Armstrong Siddeley had designations that came from the tax horsepower rating of their engines.

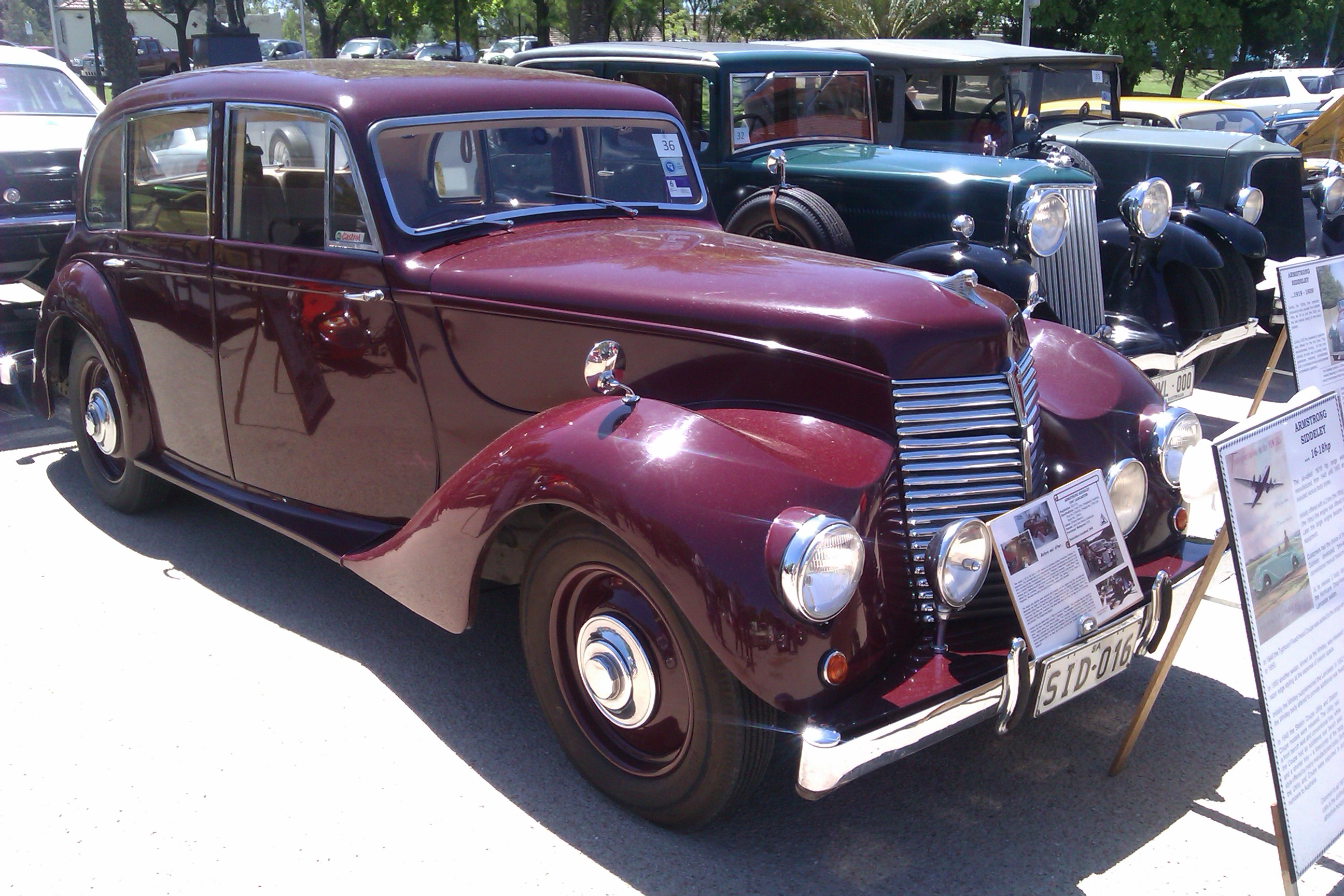
Lancaster six-light saloon

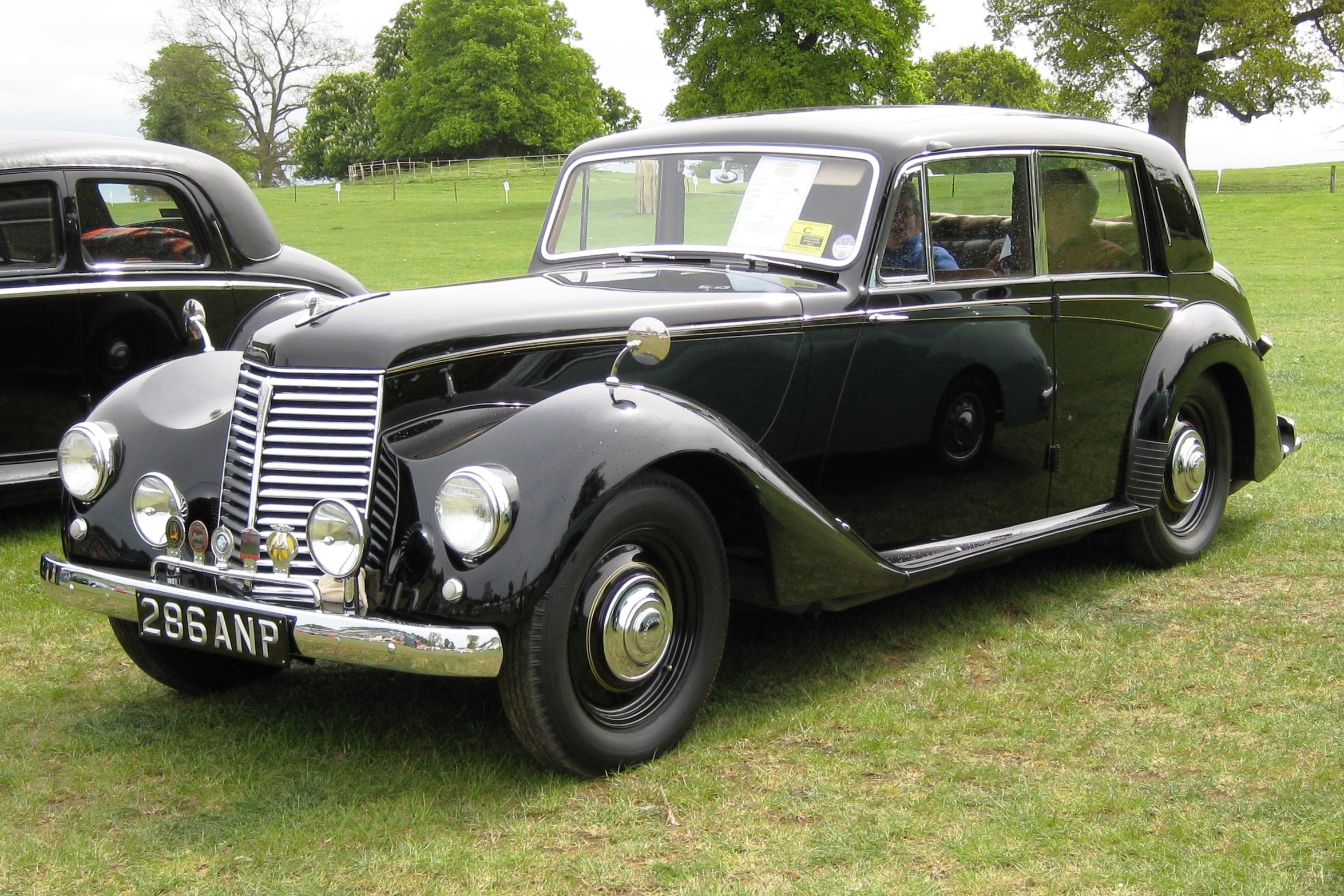
Whitley four-light sports saloon

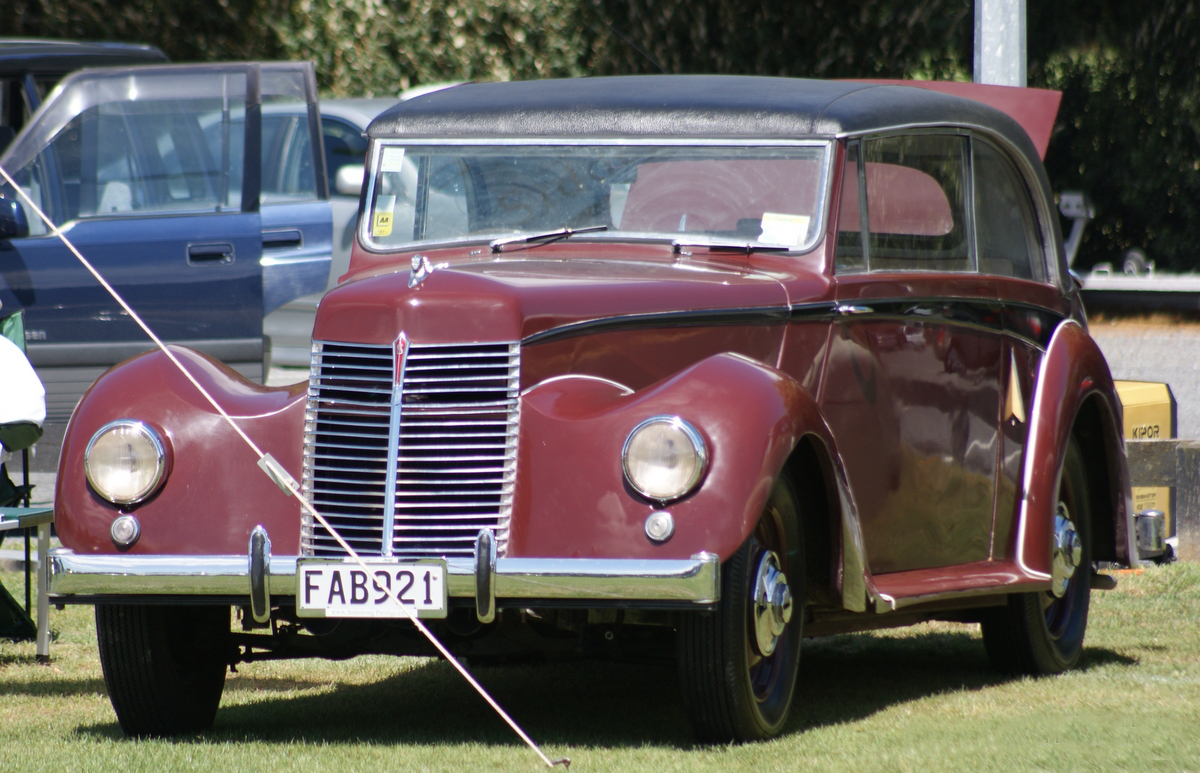
Typhoon fixed head coupé

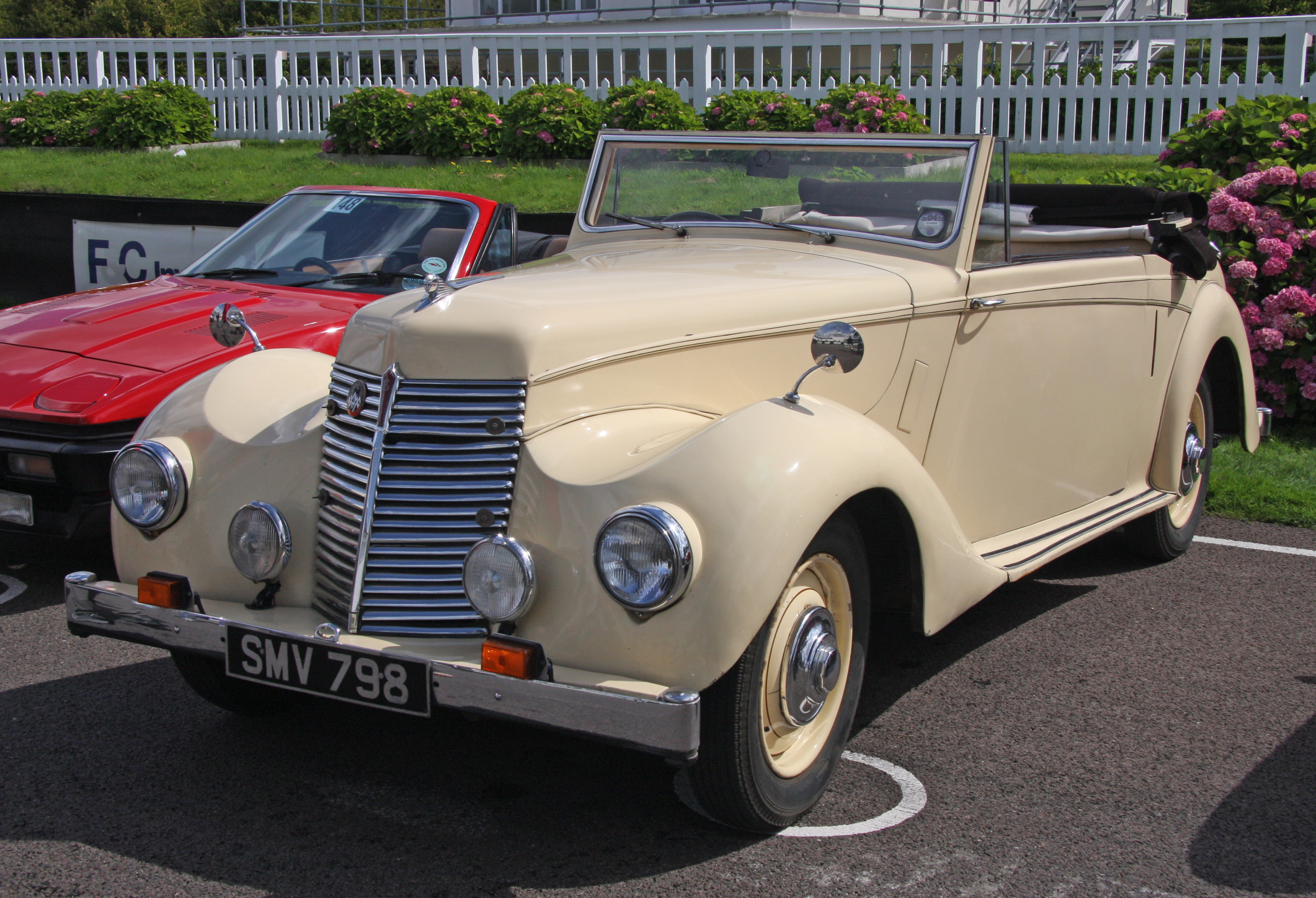
Hurricane drophead coupé

Model name	Type	Engine	From	To	No. produced
Thirty	Various	4960 cc	1919	1931	2770
Eighteen	Various	2380 cc	1921	1925	2500 (combined)
18/50 or 18 Mk.II	Various	2872 cc	1925	1926	2500 (combined)
Four-Fourteen	Various	1852 cc	1923	1929	13,365
Twenty	Short and Long chassis	2872 cc	1926	1936	8847
Fifteen	Tourer, saloon	1900 cc	1927	1929	7203 inc 15/6
Twelve	Tourer, saloon, sports	1236 (1434 cc from 1931)	1929	1937	12,500
15/6	Tourer, saloon, sports	1900 cc (2169 cc from 1933)	1928	1934	7206 (incl. Fifteen)
Siddeley Special	Tourer, saloon, limousine	4960 cc	1933	1937	253
Short 17	Coupe, saloon, sports saloon	2394 cc	1935	1938	4260 (combined)
Long 17	Saloon, tourer, Atalanta sports saloon, Limousine, landaulette	2394 cc	1935	1939	4260 (combined)
12 Plus & 14	Saloon, tourer	1666 cc	1936	1939	3750
20/25	Saloon, tourer, Atlanta sports saloon Limousine, landaulette	3670 cc	1936	1940	884
16	Saloon, Sports saloon	1991 cc	1938	1941	950
Lancaster 16	4-door saloon	1991 cc	1945	1952	3597 (combined)
Lancaster 18	4-door saloon	2309 cc	1945	1952	3597 (combined)
Hurricane 16	Drophead coupé	1991 cc	1945	1953	2606 (combined)
Hurricane 18	Drophead coupé	2309 cc	1945	1953	2606 (combined)
Typhoon	2-door fixed-head coupé	1991 cc	1946	1949	1701
Tempest	4-door fixed-head coupé	1991 cc	1946	1949	6
Whitley 18	Various	2309 cc	1949	1953	2624
Sapphire 346	4-door saloon & Limousine	3435 cc	1952	1958	7697
Sapphire 234	4-door saloon	2290 cc	1955	1958	803
Sapphire 236	4-door saloon	2309 cc	1955	1957	603
Star Sapphire	Saloon & Limousine	3990 cc	1958	1960	980
Star Sapphire Mk II	Saloon & Limousine	3990 cc	1960	1960	1

A feature of many of their later cars was the option of an electrically controlled pre-selector gearbox.

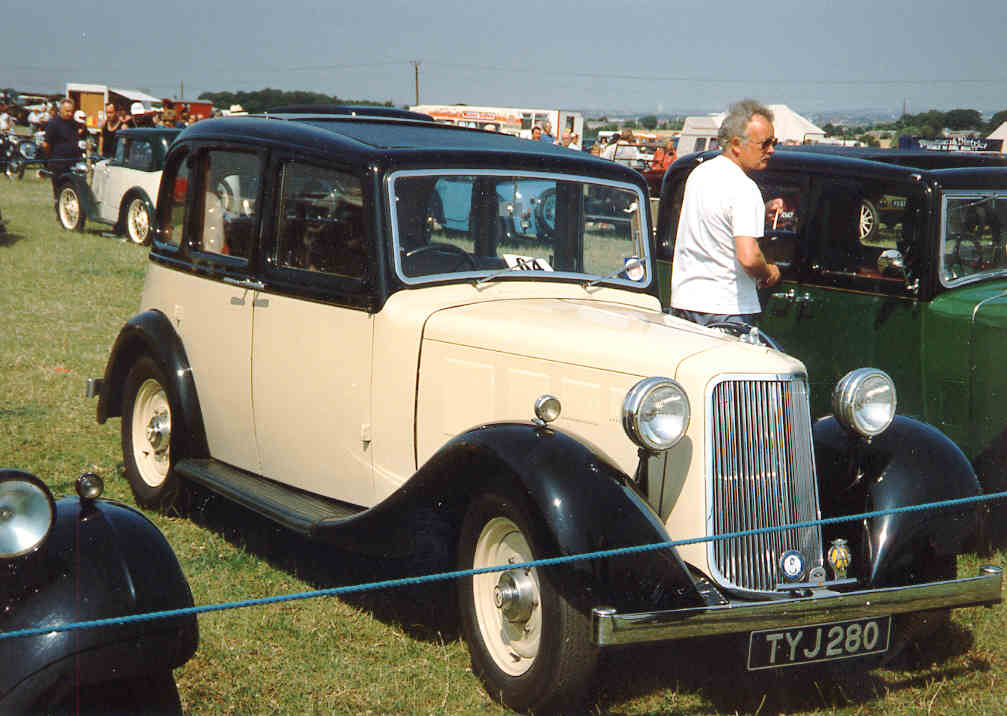
Twelve 1½-litre

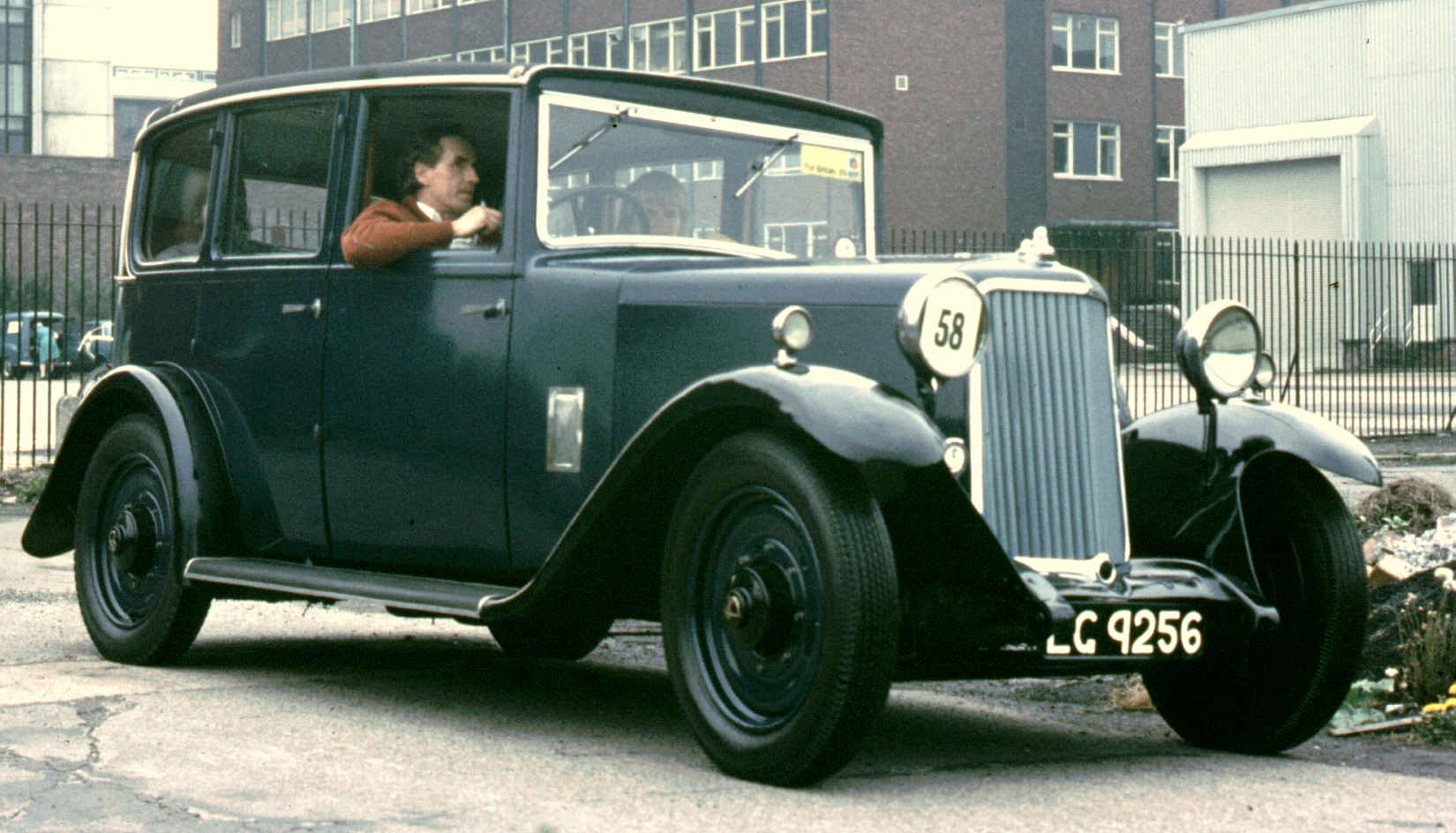
Fifteen 2-litre

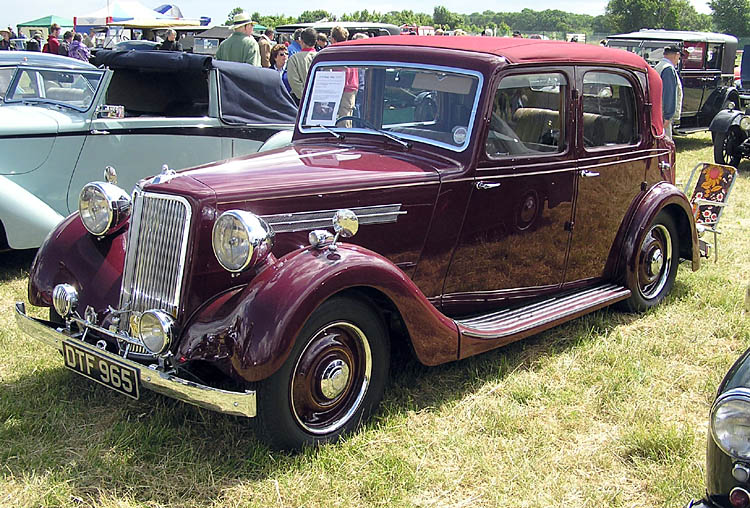
Sixteen 2¼-litre

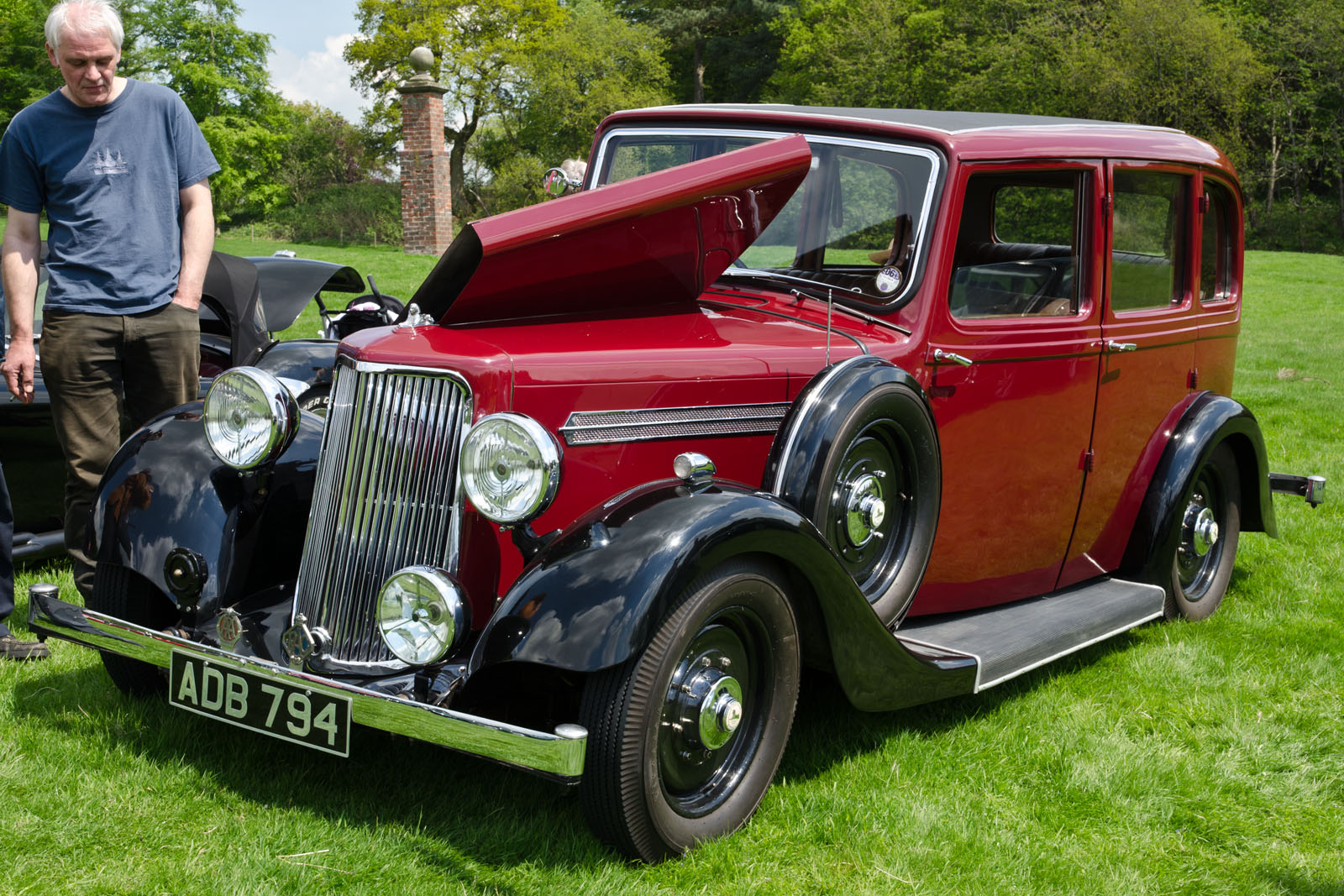
Seventeen 2½-litre

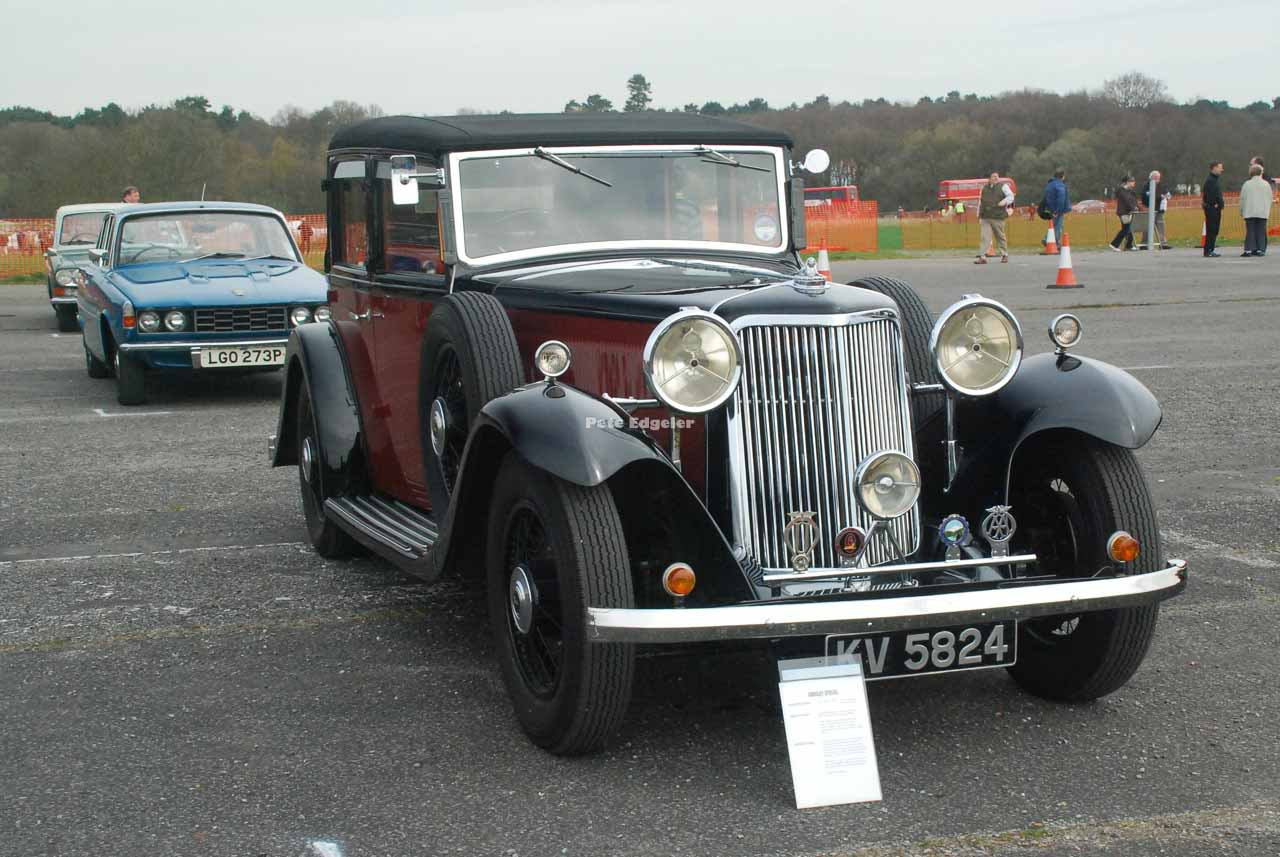
Thirty 5-litre

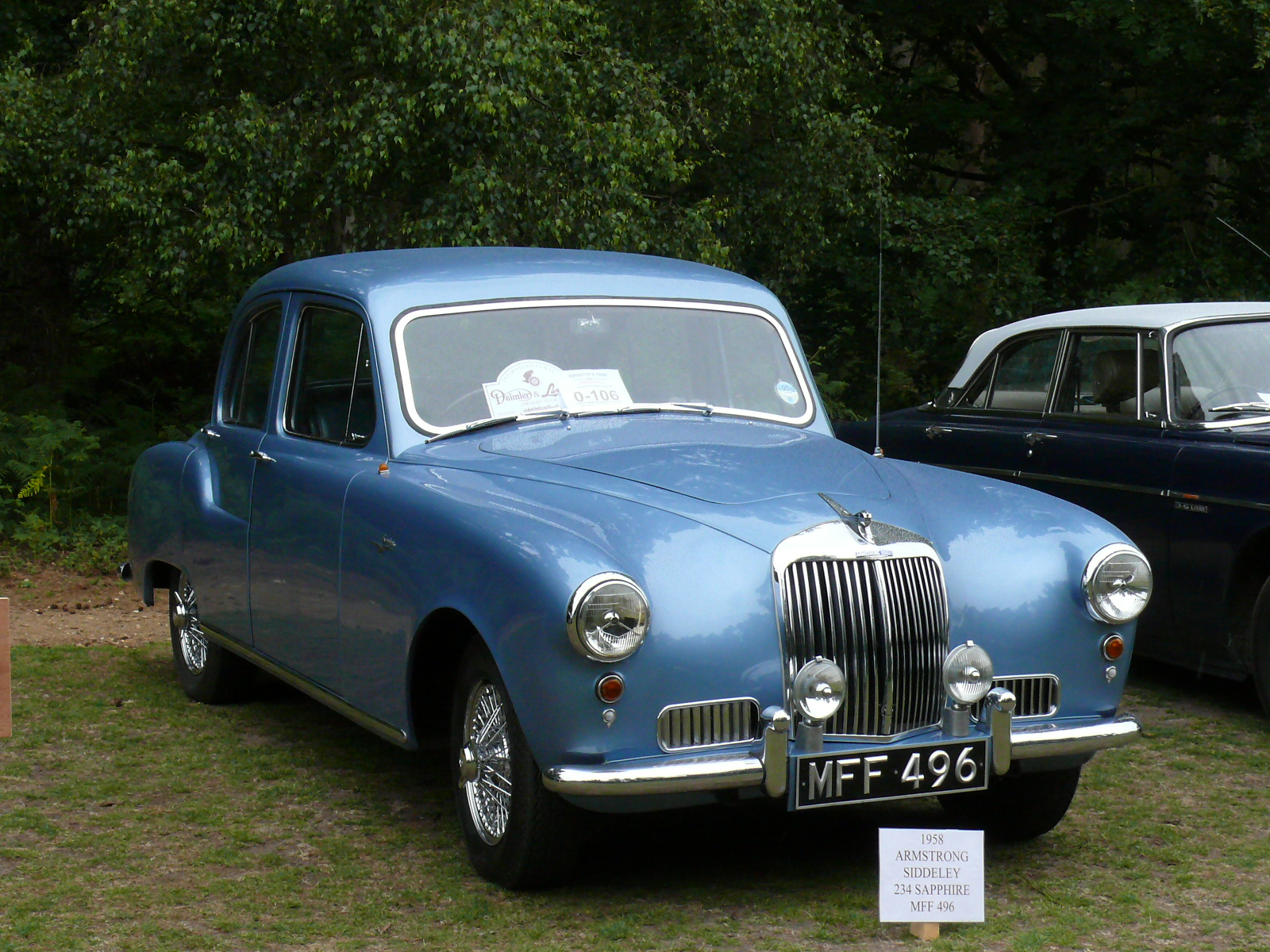
Sapphire 234
2.3-Litre 4-cylinder

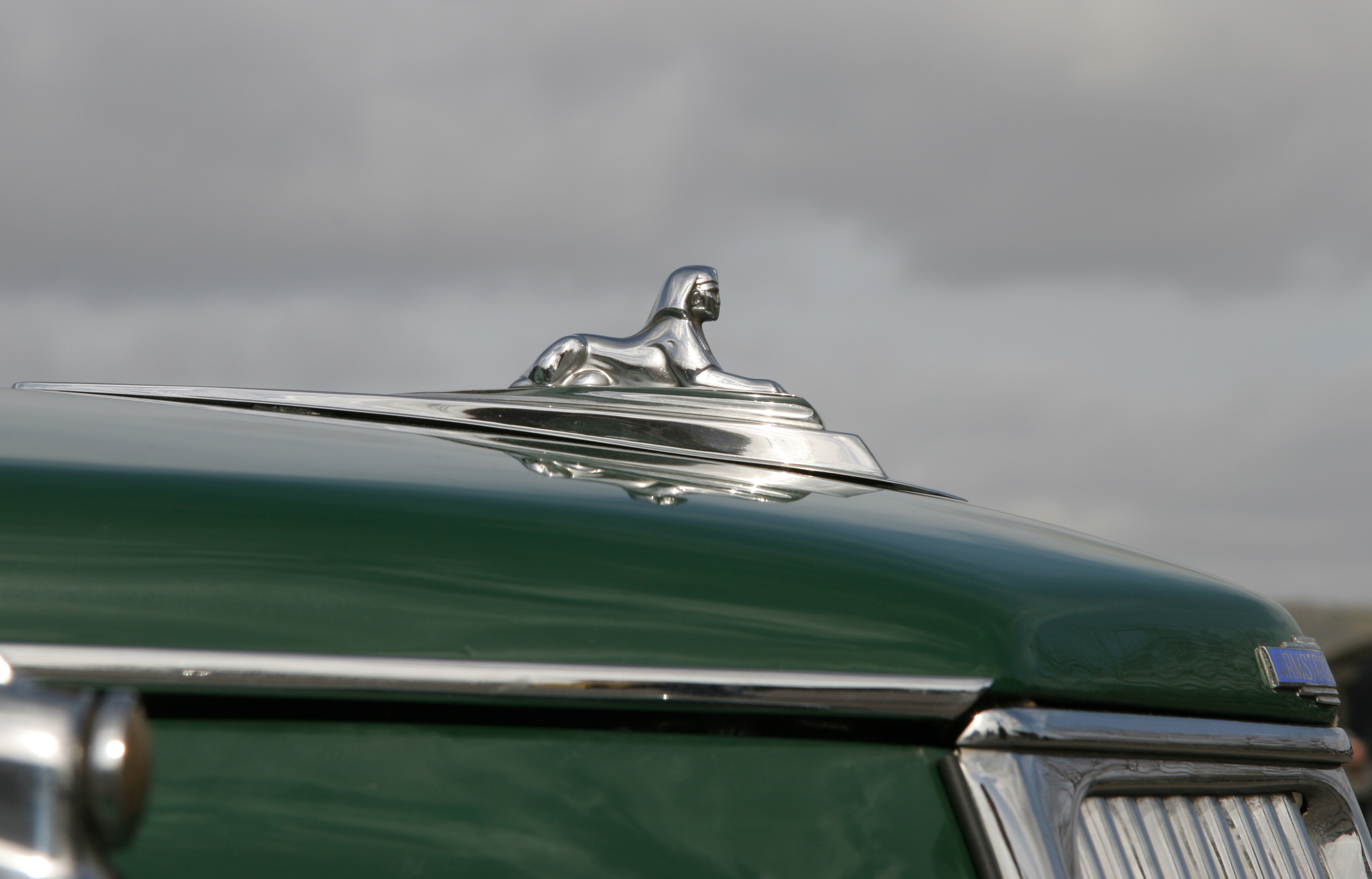
Armstrong Siddeley's sphinx

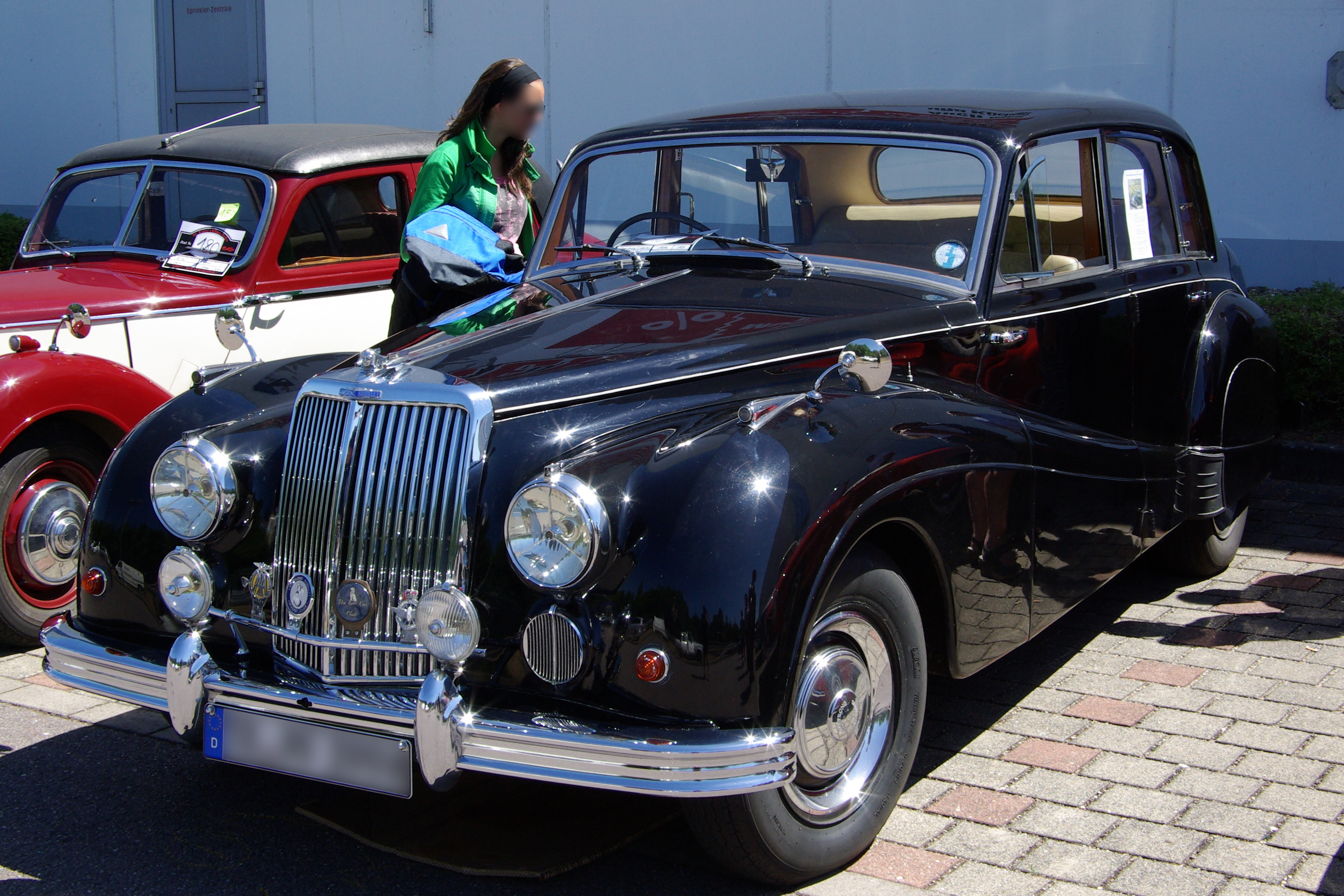
Sapphire 346
3.4-Litre 6-cylinder

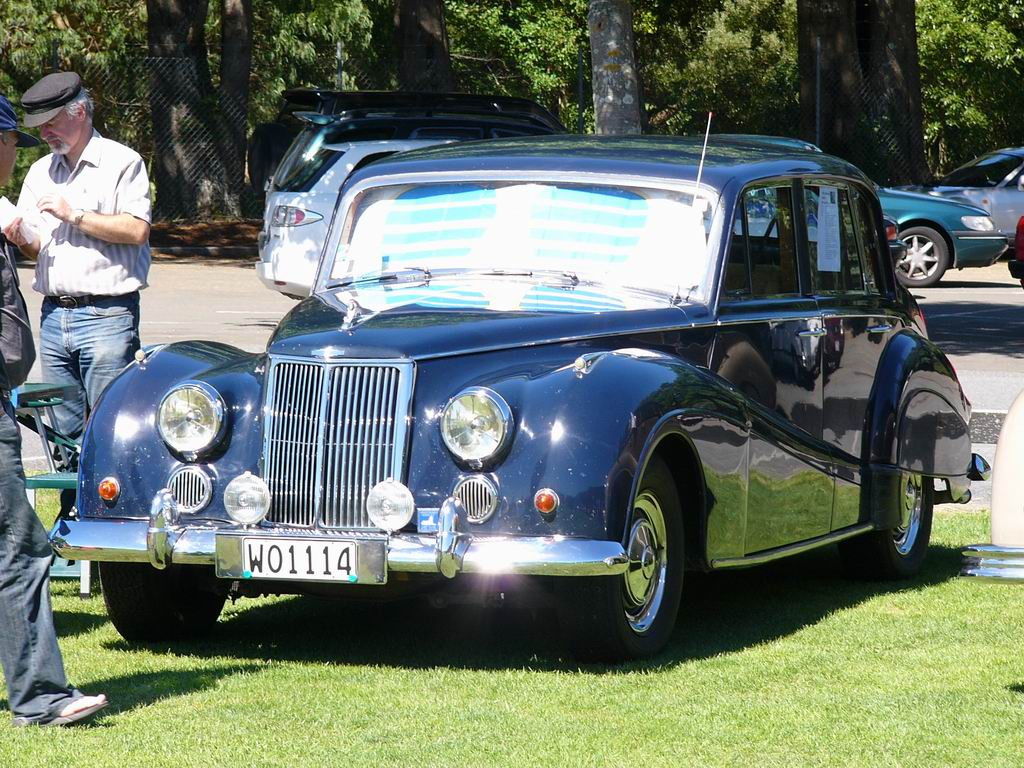
Star Sapphire
4-Litre 6-cylinder

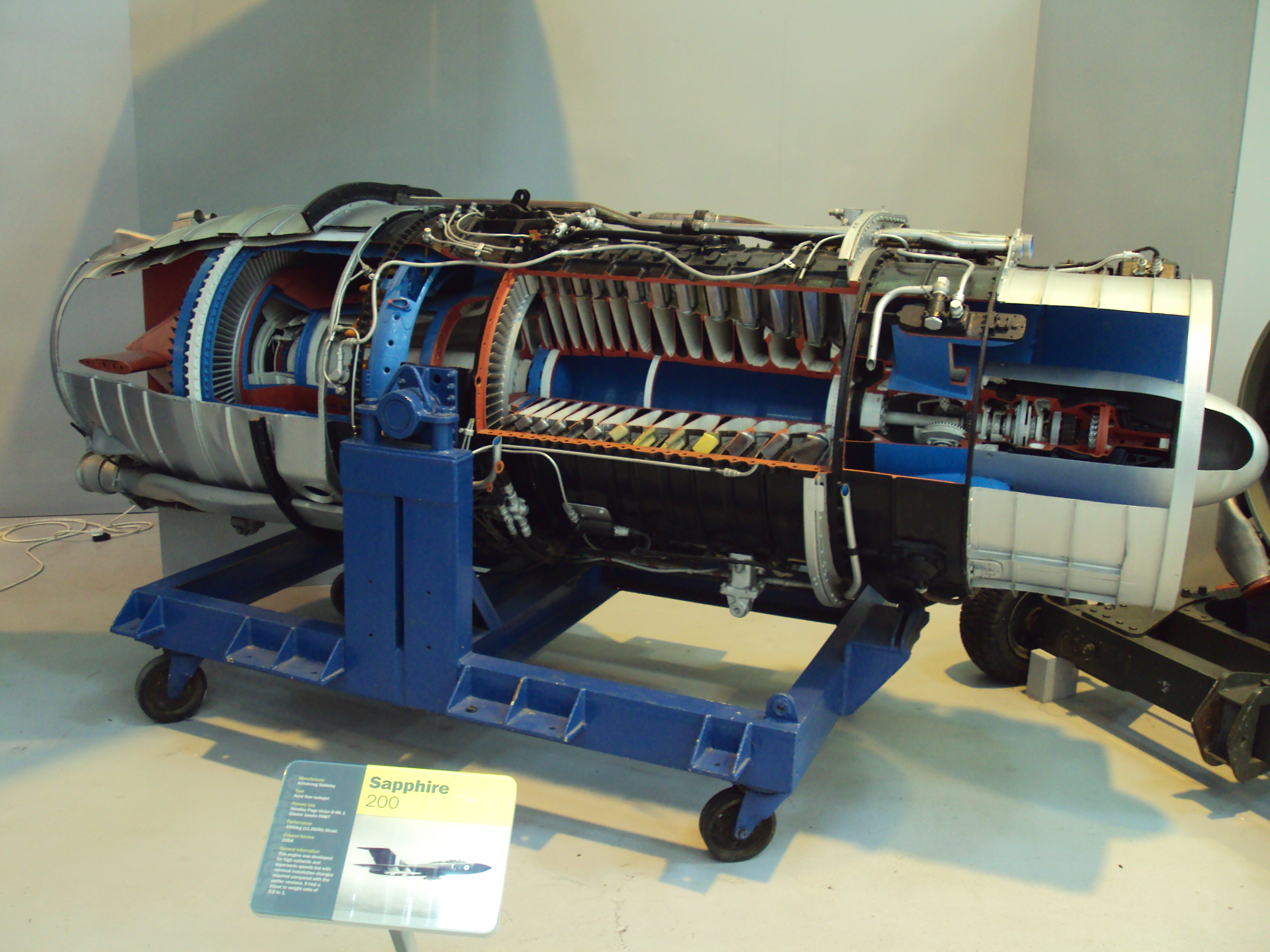
Sapphire 200
turbojet

==== Clubs ====
Like many British cars of this era, there are active owners' clubs supporting their continued use in several countries, e.g. the UK, Australia, New Zealand, the Netherlands and Germany. Armstrong Siddeley Owners Club Ltd has members worldwide and many members of the ASCC in Australia are resident overseas.

In the United Kingdom, ASOC publishes a monthly members magazine Sphinx. In Australia, the Armstrong Siddeley Car Club publishes Southern Sphinx six times a year. In the Netherlands, ASOC Dutch also publishes six times a year, and in New Zealand, Armstrong Siddeley Car Club in New Zealand Inc. publish Sphinx-NZ monthly.

=== Aircraft engines ===
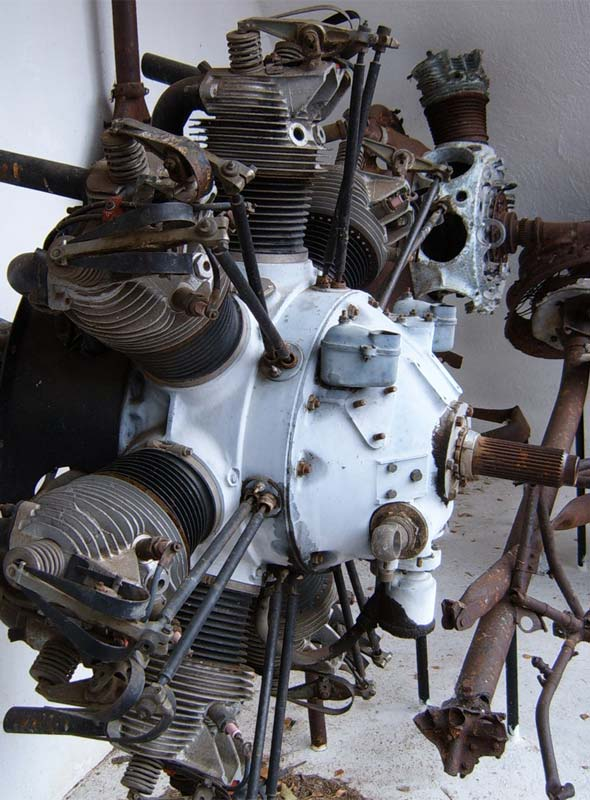
Armstrong Siddeley Lynx 7 cylinder radial from the Avro 618 Ten aircraft, Southern Cloud

Throughout the 1920s and 1930s, Armstrong Siddeley produced a range of low- and mid-power aircraft radial engines, all named after big cats. They also produced a tiny 2-cylinder engine called the Ounce, another name for the snow leopard, for ultralight aircraft.

The company started work on their first gas turbine engine in 1939, following the design pioneered at the Royal Aircraft Establishment by Alan Arnold Griffith. Known as the "ASX" for "Armstrong Siddeley eXperimental", the original pure-turbojet design was later adapted to drive a propeller, resulting in the "ASP". From then on, AS turbine engines were named after snakes. The Mamba and Double Mamba were turboprop engines, the latter being a complex piece of engineering with two side-by-side Mambas driving through a common gearbox, and could be found on the Fairey Gannet. The Python turboprop powered the Westland Wyvern strike aircraft. Further development of the Mamba removed the reduction gearbox to give the Adder turbojet.

Another pioneer in the production of the RAE engine design was Metrovick, who started with a design known as the Metrovick F.2. This engine never entered production, and Metrovick turned to a larger design, the Beryl, and then to an even larger design, the Sapphire. Armstrong Siddeley later took over the Sapphire design, and it went on to be one of the most successful 2nd generation jet engines, competing with the better-known Rolls-Royce Avon.

The company went on to develop an engine – originally for unmanned Jindivik target drones – called the Viper. This product was further developed by Bristol Siddeley and, later, Rolls-Royce and was sold in great numbers over many years. A range of rocket motors were also produced, including the Snarler and Stentor. The rocket development complemented that of Bristol, and Bristol Siddeley would become the leading British manufacturer of rocket engines for missiles.

Aero and rocket engines
	year	type
Armstrong Siddeley Cheetah	1935	7-cyl radial
Armstrong Siddeley Civet	1928	7-cylinder radial
Armstrong Siddeley Cougar	1945	9-cylinder radial not-produced
Armstrong Siddeley Deerhound	1935	21-cylinder 3-row in-line radial engine. Not produced
Armstrong Siddeley Genet	1926	5-cylinder radial
Armstrong Siddeley Genet Major	1928	radial
Armstrong Siddeley Hyena	1933	experimental 15-cylinder 3-row inline radial
Armstrong Siddeley Jaguar	1923	14-cylinder 2-row radial
Armstrong Siddeley Leopard	1927	14-cylinder, 2-row radial
Armstrong Siddeley Lynx	1920	radial
Armstrong Siddeley Mongoose	1926	5-cyl radial
Armstrong Siddeley Ounce	1920	2-cylinder opposed
Armstrong Siddeley Panther	1929	14-cylinder 2-row radial
Armstrong Siddeley Puma	1917-1918	6 cylinder water-cooled inline aircraft piston engine
Armstrong Siddeley Serval	1928	10-cylinder 2-row radial
Armstrong Siddeley Tiger	1932	14-cylinder 2-row radial supercharged
Armstrong Siddeley ASX	1945	axial flow turbojet
Armstrong Siddeley Python	1945	turboprop, also known as ASP
Armstrong Siddeley Double Mamba	1949	Two Mamba linked by gearbox
Armstrong Siddeley Mamba	1946	turboprop
Armstrong Siddeley Sapphire	1948	turbojet
Armstrong Siddeley Adder	1948	turbojet
Armstrong Siddeley Viper	1951	turbojet
Armstrong Siddeley Snarler	1950	rocket

=== Diesel engines ===
In 1946 Armstrong Siddeley produced their first diesel engines. They were medium-speed engines for industrial and agricultural use. Initially there was a single-cylinder engine producing 5 bhp (3.7 kW) at 900 rpm and a twin-cylinder version. Each cylinder had a capacity of 988 cm^{3} (60.2 cubic inches). The power output and speed was progressively increased. By the end of 1954 the single-cylinder engine was rated at 11 bhp (8.2 kW) at 1800 rpm and the twin-cylinder engine 22 bhp (16 kW) at the same speed. In 1955 the range was extended with the introduction of a 3-cylinder engine rated at 33 bhp (25 kW).

The engines were built at Armstrong Siddeley's factory at Walnut Street in Leicester until that factory closed in August 1957. Production was transferred to the factory of Armstrong Siddeley (Brockworth) Ltd in Gloucestershire and in 1958 to the factory of Petters Limited at Staines, Middlesex. The engines built by Petters were designated AS1, AS2 and AS3 to distinguish them from that company's other products. Production ended in 1962 when Petters introduced a replacement range of lightweight small high-speed air-cooled diesel engines.

In April 1958 the company obtained a licence to build the Maybach MD series high-speed diesel engines. Several hundred were built by Bristol Siddeley Engines Ltd after that company took over Armstrong Siddeley's manufacturing activities in 1959.

== See also ==
- List of aircraft engines
- List of car manufacturers of the United Kingdom
