= Armstrong Siddeley Hurricane =

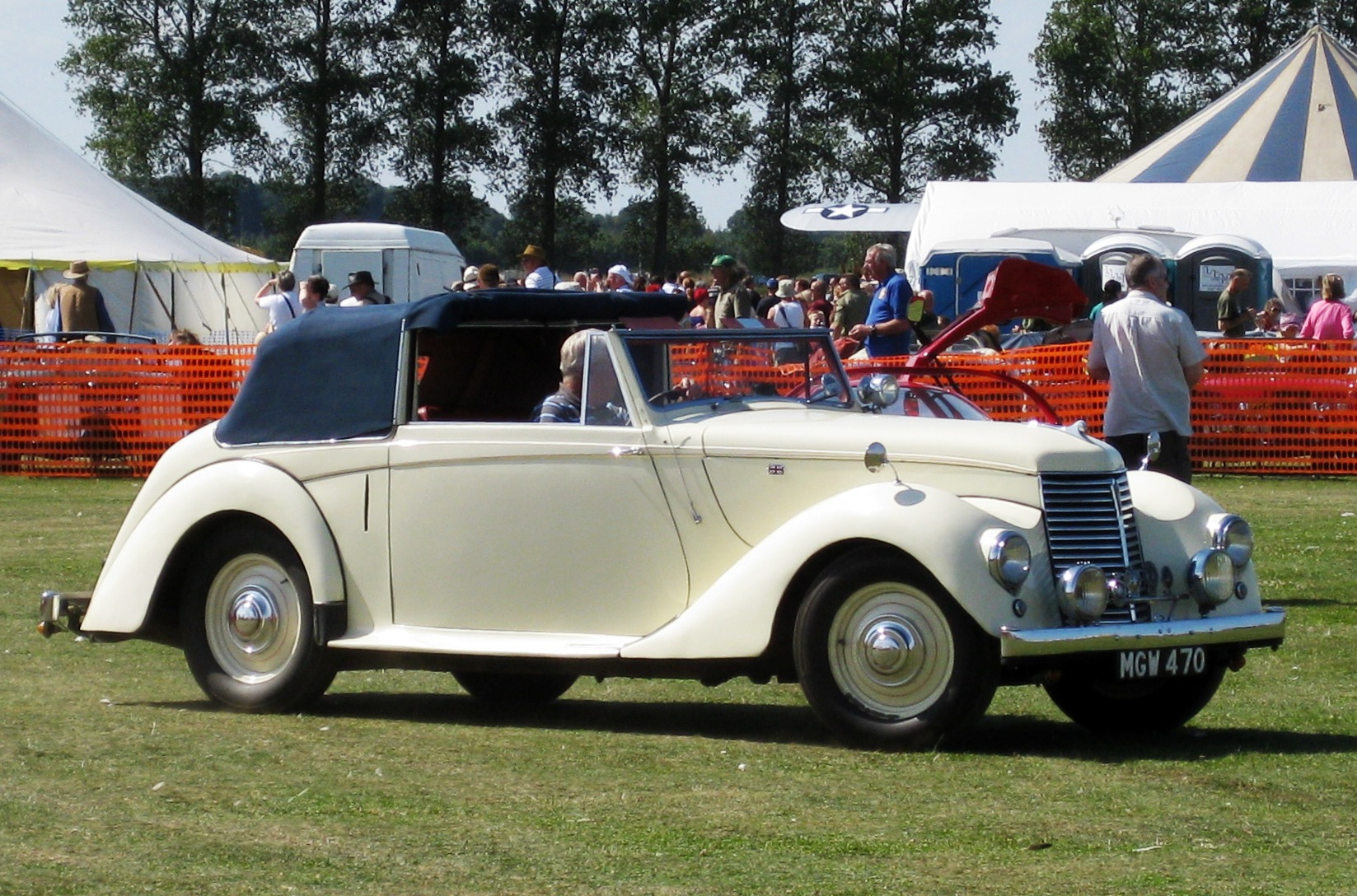
- Armstrong Siddeley Hurricane of 1951

Overview
- Manufacturer: Armstrong Siddeley Motors
- Production: 1946–1953; 2606 made

Body and chassis
- Body style: four seat drophead coupé
- Related: Armstrong Siddeley Lancaster; Armstrong Siddeley Typhoon

Powertrain
- Engine: 1991 or 2309 cc Straight-6
- Transmission: 4-speed manual

Dimensions
- Wheelbase: 115 in (2,921 mm)
- Length: 188 in (4,775 mm)
- Width: 68 in (1,727 mm)
- Height: 61 in (1,549 mm)

The Armstrong Siddeley Hurricane is a two-door, four-seat drophead coupé automobile produced by the British company of Armstrong Siddeley from 1946 until 1953. It was based on the Armstrong Siddeley Lancaster saloon.

The chassis featured independent front suspension using torsion bars and a live rear axle with leaf springs. A Girling hydro-mechanical braking system was fitted, with the front drums hydraulically operated while those at the rear used rod and cable.

Early models of the Hurricane were fitted with a 70 bhp 1991 cc six-cylinder, overhead-valve engine, carried over from the pre-war 16 hp model but beginning in 1949 this was enlarged to a 75 bhp 2309 cc by increasing the cylinder bore from 65 to 70 mm. There was a choice of 4-speed synchromesh or pre-selector gearbox.

The four-seat, two-door body was made of steel and aluminum panel fitted over a wood and aluminum frame. The doors were rear hinged, an arrangement that got the name of suicide doors. Changes during the model life were minimal: however, the bonnet line was slightly lowered for 1948 when the car also acquired stoneguards on the leading edges of its rear wings.

At launch, the car cost £1151 on the UK market.

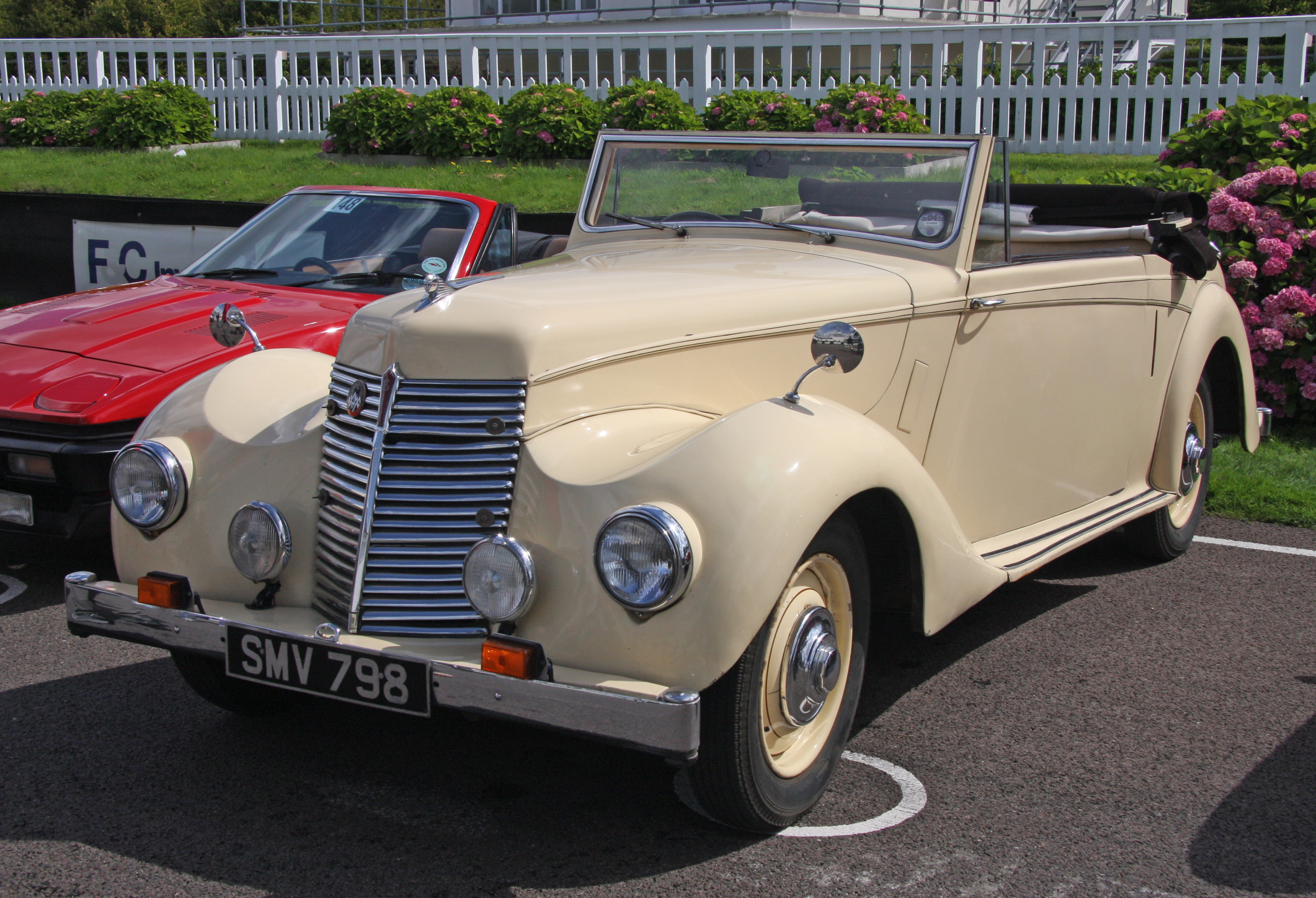
Armstrong Siddeley Hurricane

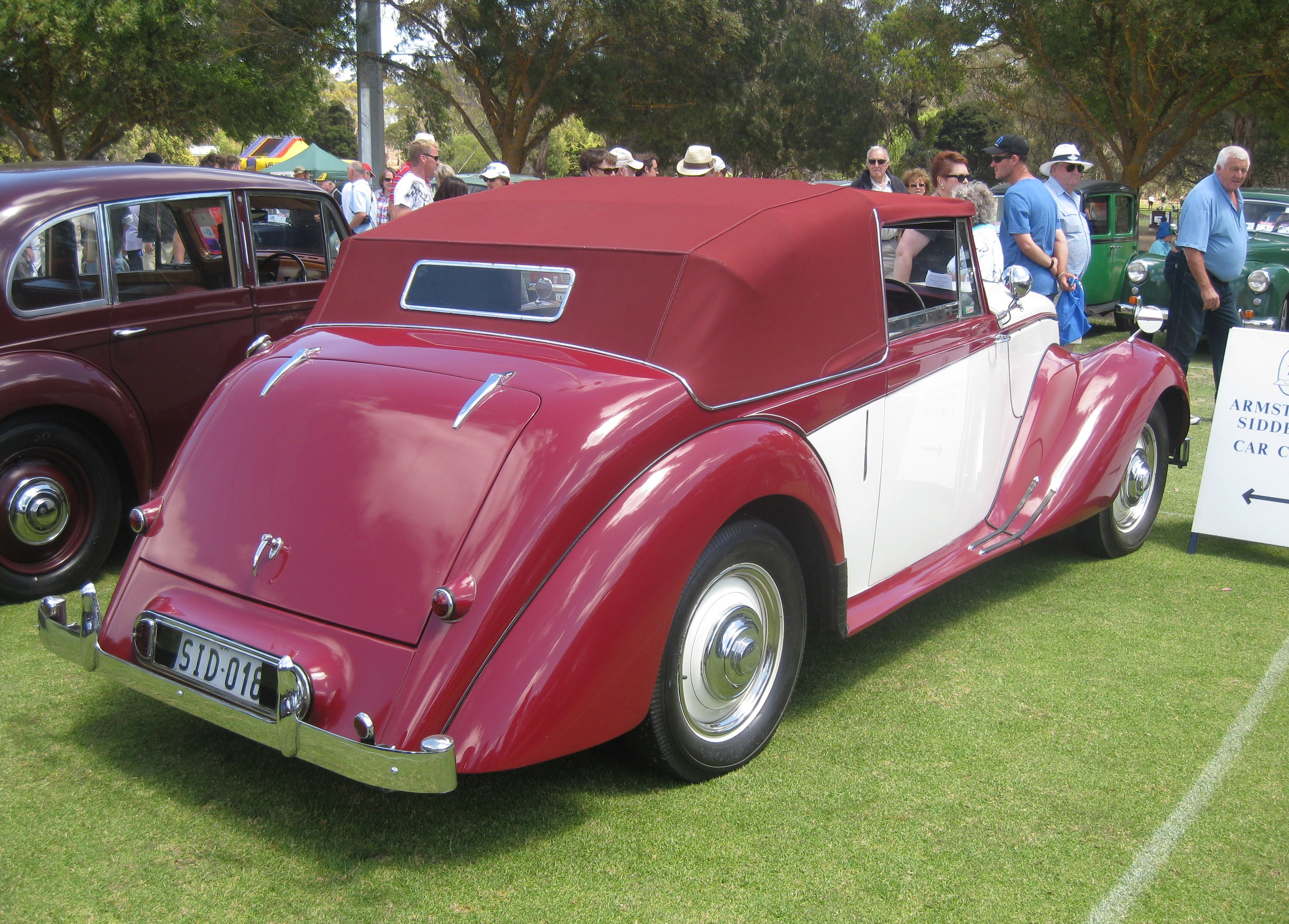
Armstrong Siddeley Hurricane of 1952
