= Armstrong Siddeley Whitley 18 =

Armstrong Siddeley Whitley
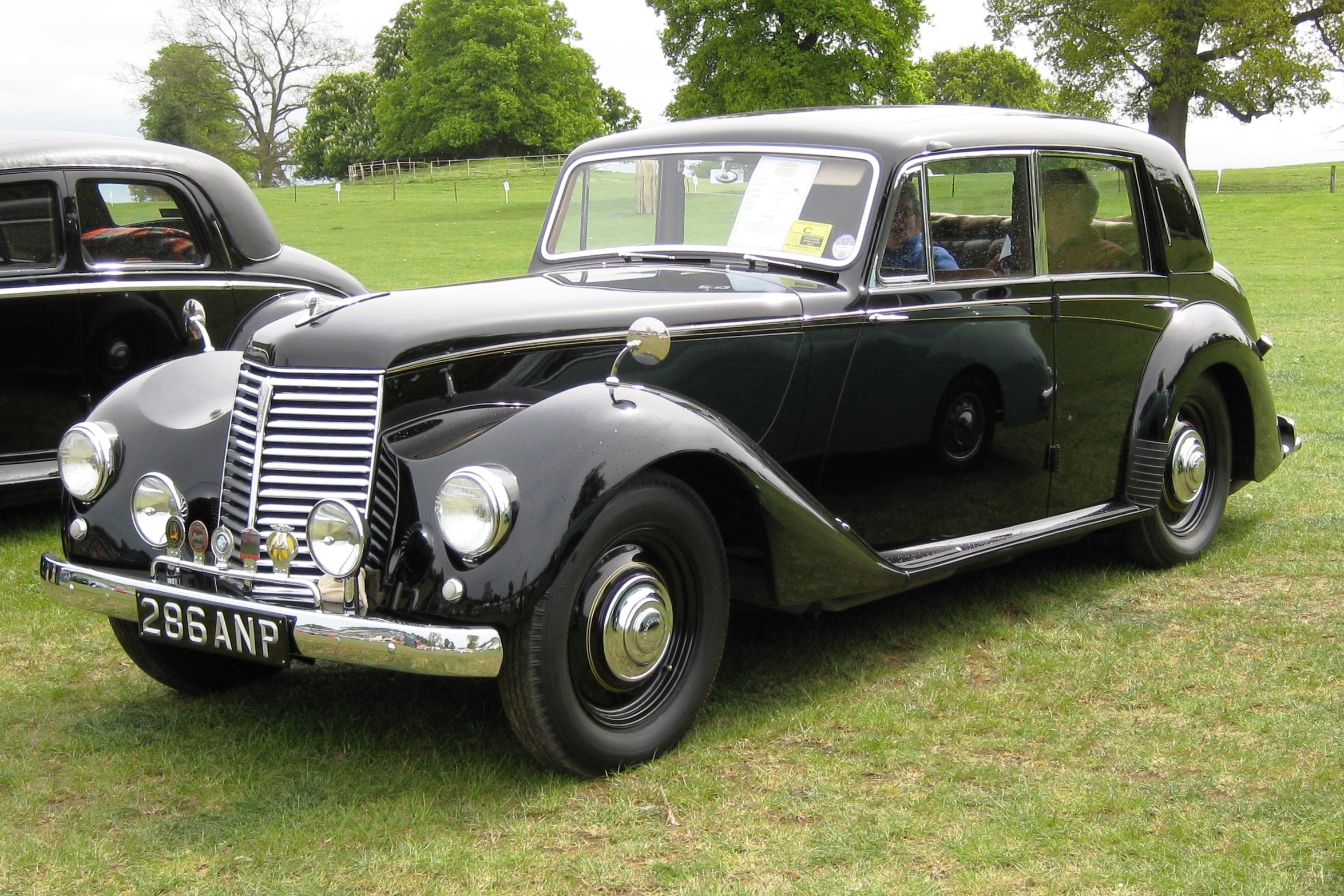

Overview
- Manufacturer: Armstrong Siddeley Motors
- Production: 1949–1954; 4321 made

Body and chassis
- Class: executive
- Body style: 4 and 6 light saloon limousine Coupé utility (pickup)

Powertrain
- Engine: 2309 cc Straight-6

Dimensions
- Wheelbase: 115 or 122 in (2,920 or 3,100 mm)
- Length: 185 in (4,700 mm)
- Width: 68 in (1,730 mm)

Chronology
- Predecessor: Armstrong Siddeley Lancaster
- Successor: Armstrong Siddeley Sapphire

The Armstrong Siddeley Whitley is a large post-war sports saloon automobile and a version of the 16/18 hp series made between 1946 and 1954 by the British company of Armstrong Siddeley. The Whitley was the last of the range to enter production, first appearing in 1949.

The Whitley only used the larger 2309 cc overhead valve engine with a tax rating of 18 hp that had first appeared on export versions of the Tempest coupled with a choice of synchromesh or pre-selector gearbox. The front suspension was independent using torsion bars, while at the rear was a live axle and leaf springs. A Girling hydro-mechanical braking system was fitted, with the front drums hydraulically operated, while those at the rear were cable.

A variety of body styles were made. Most common are the 4 or 6 light saloons, but limousines were also made on a long-wheelbase chassis from 1950 to 1952.

The Utility Coupe and Station Coupe were coupé utility versions made for the export market and in particular for Australia. The former had a conventional front seat only and the latter had an extended cabin with a small additional seat at the rear.

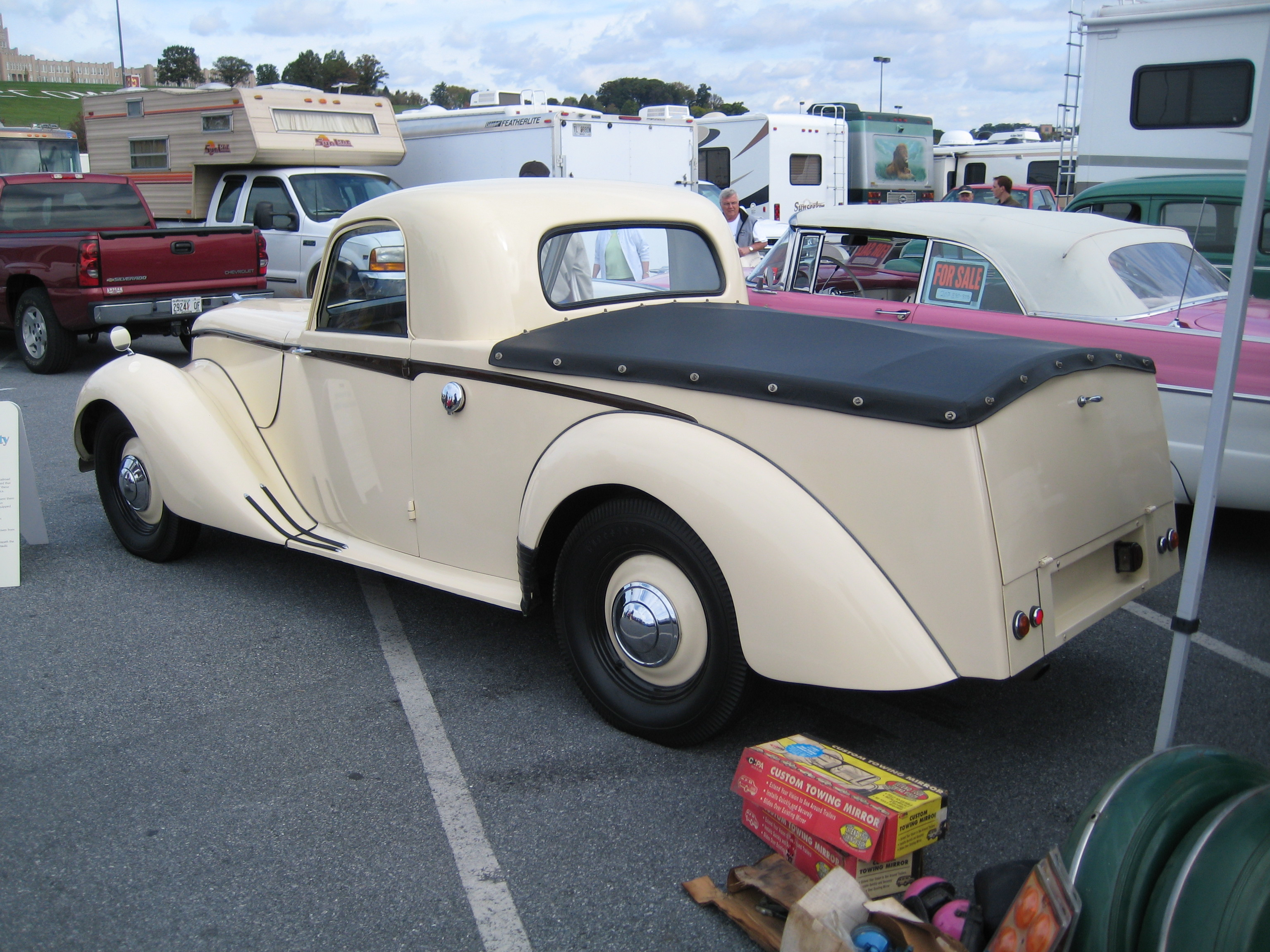
Armstrong Siddeley Utility Coupe

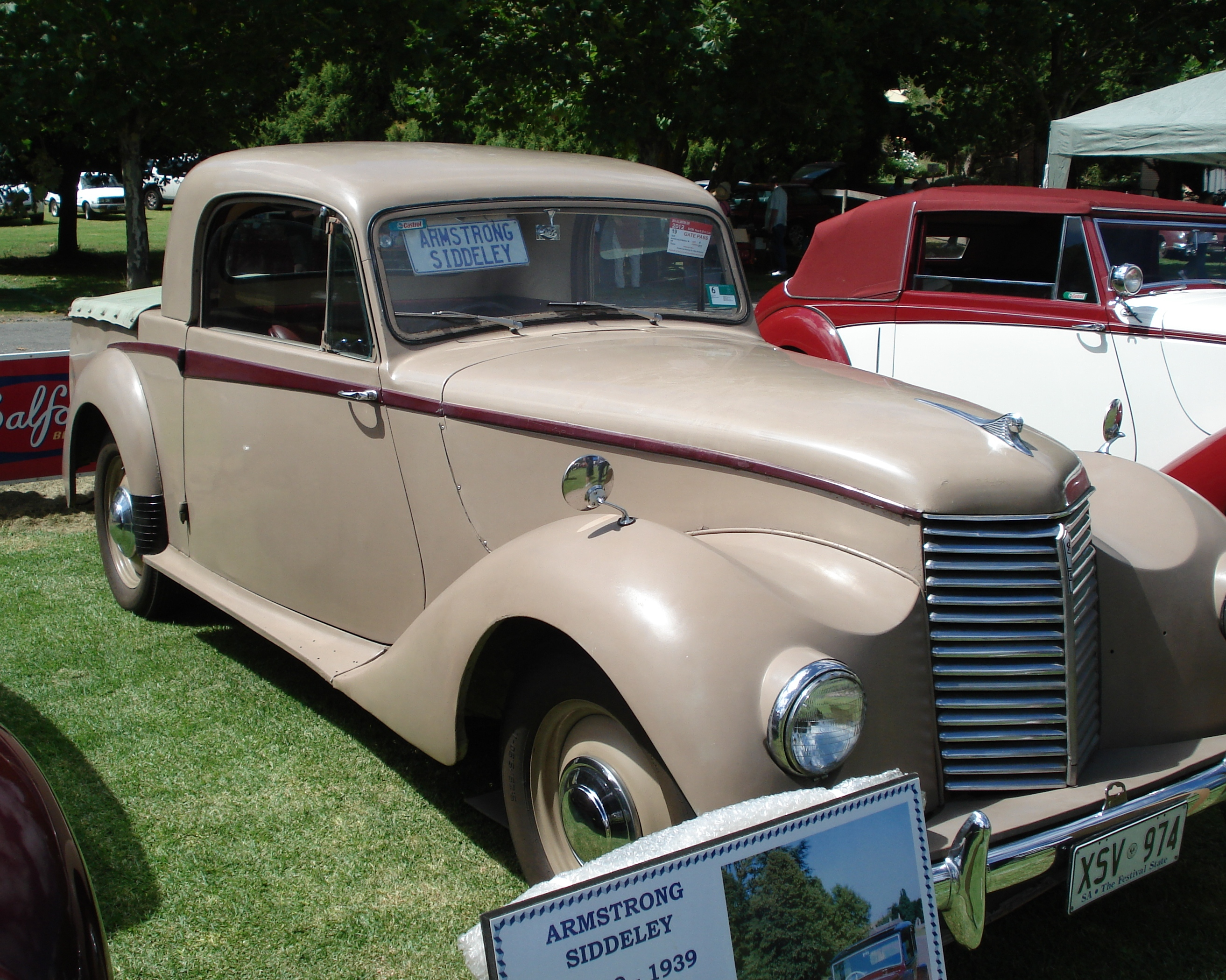
1950 Armstrong Siddeley Station Coupe
