= Armstrong Siddeley Lancaster =

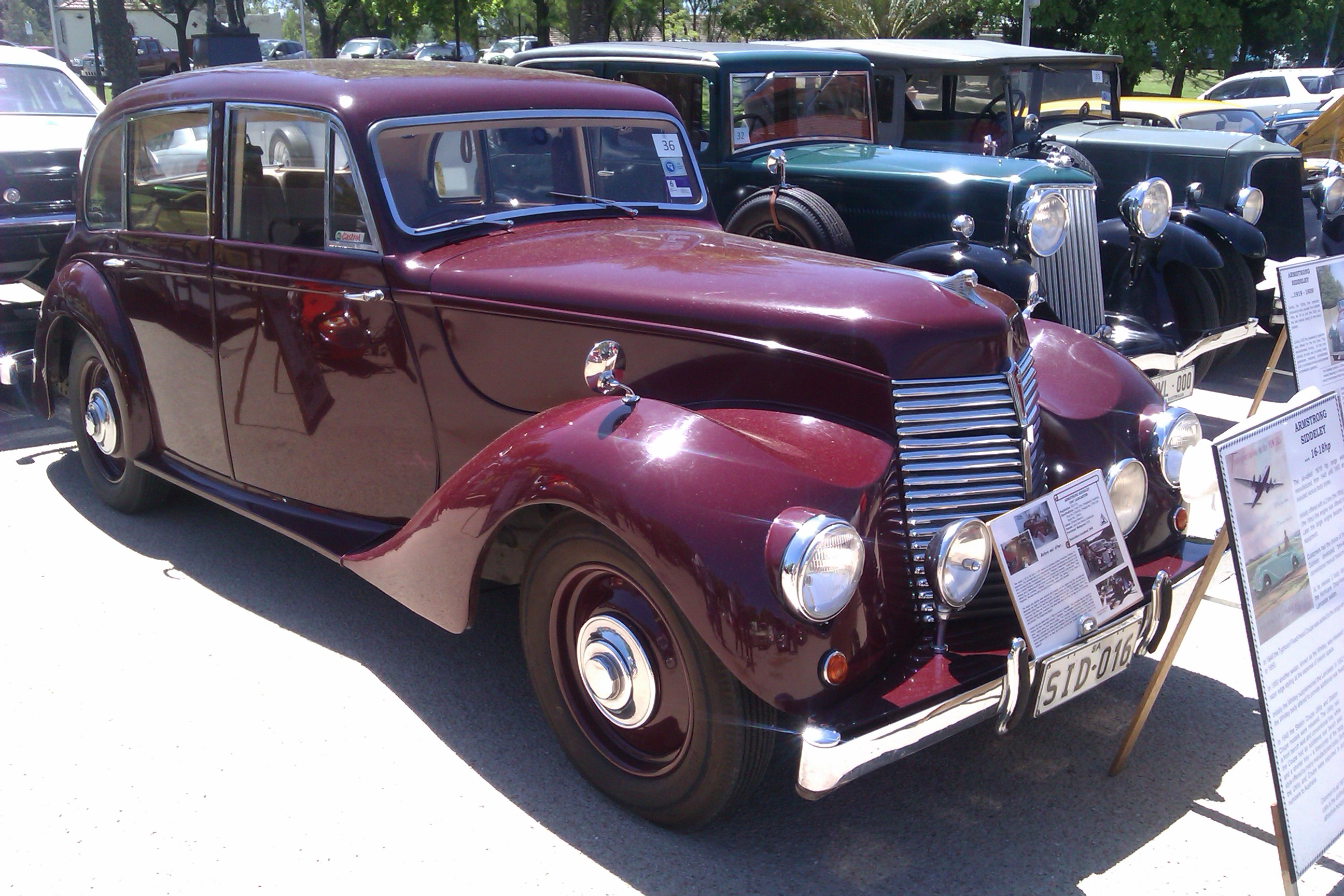
- Armstrong Siddeley Lancaster

Overview
- Manufacturer: Armstrong Siddeley Motors
- Production: 1945–1952; 3597 made

Body and chassis
- Body style: 4-door 6 light saloon
- Related: Armstrong Siddeley Hurricane; Armstrong Siddeley Typhoon

Powertrain
- Engine: 1991 or 2309 cc Straight-6 ohv

Dimensions
- Wheelbase: 115 in (2,921 mm)
- Length: 188 in (4,775 mm)
- Width: 68 in (1,727 mm)
- Height: 61 in (1,500 mm)

Chronology
- Predecessor: Armstrong Siddeley 16hp
- Successor: Armstrong Siddeley Whitley

The Armstrong Siddeley Lancaster is an automobile which was produced by Armstrong Siddeley Motors Limited from 1945 until 1952. It was the first post-war sports saloon to be made by the company.

The chassis of the Lancaster was all new and featured independent front suspension using torsion bars and a live rear axle with leaf springs. A Girling hydro-mechanical braking system was fitted, with the front drums hydraulically operated while those at the rear used rod and cable. Wire wheels were an option but rarely fitted.

At first, the Lancaster was fitted with a 70 bhp 1991 cc six cylinder engine, carried over from the pre-war 16 hp model but from 1949 this grew to 2309 cc by increasing the cylinder bore from 65 to 70 mm. There was a choice of 4-speed synchromesh or pre-selector gearbox with balanced drive and balanced ride.

The four-door, six light body was made of steel and aluminum panel fitted over a wooden frame and was bought in from Mulliners of Birmingham. An opening sunshine roof was standard.

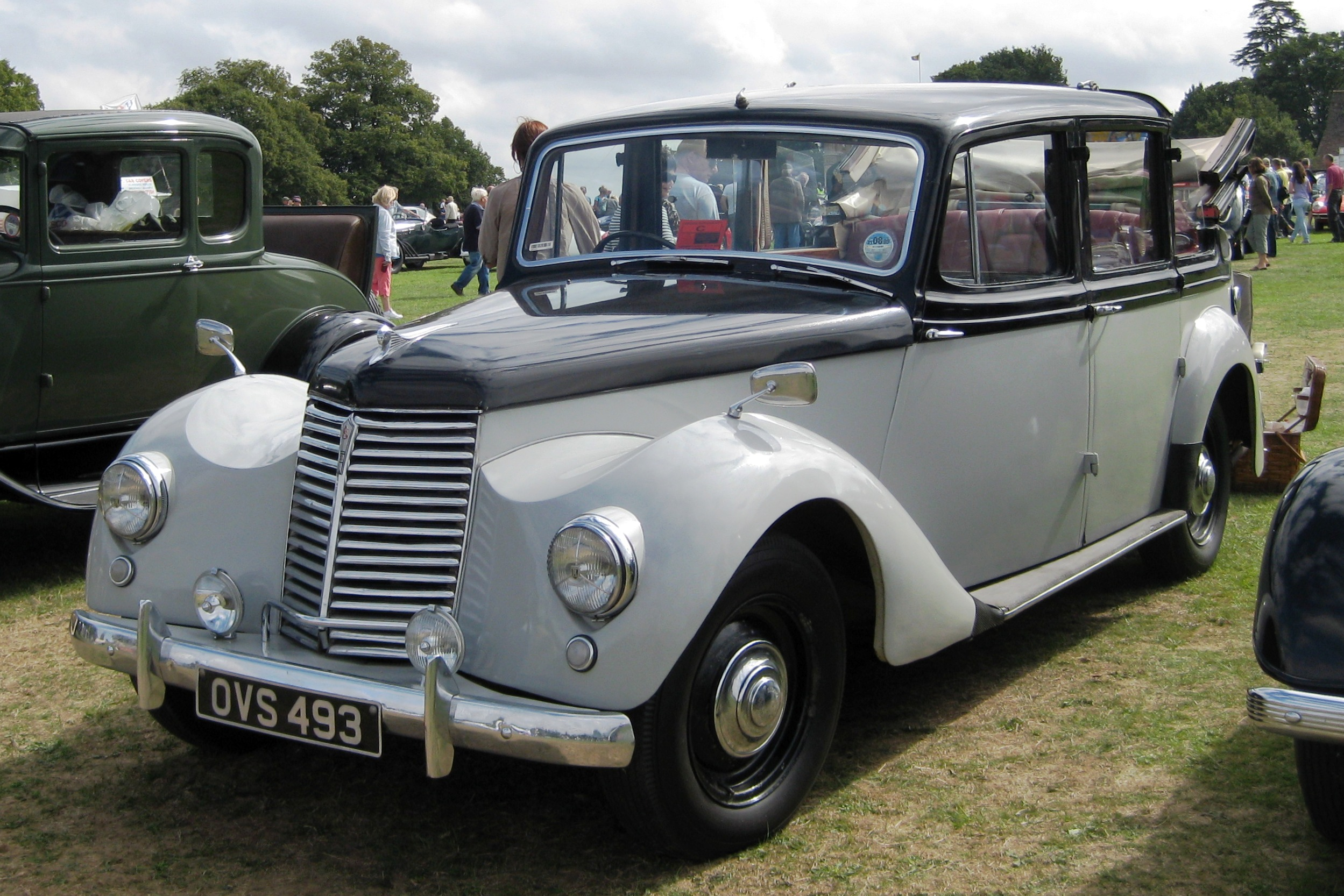
Armstrong Siddeley Lancaster with landaulette body for Malta's government
