= Armstrong Siddeley Typhoon =

British automobile

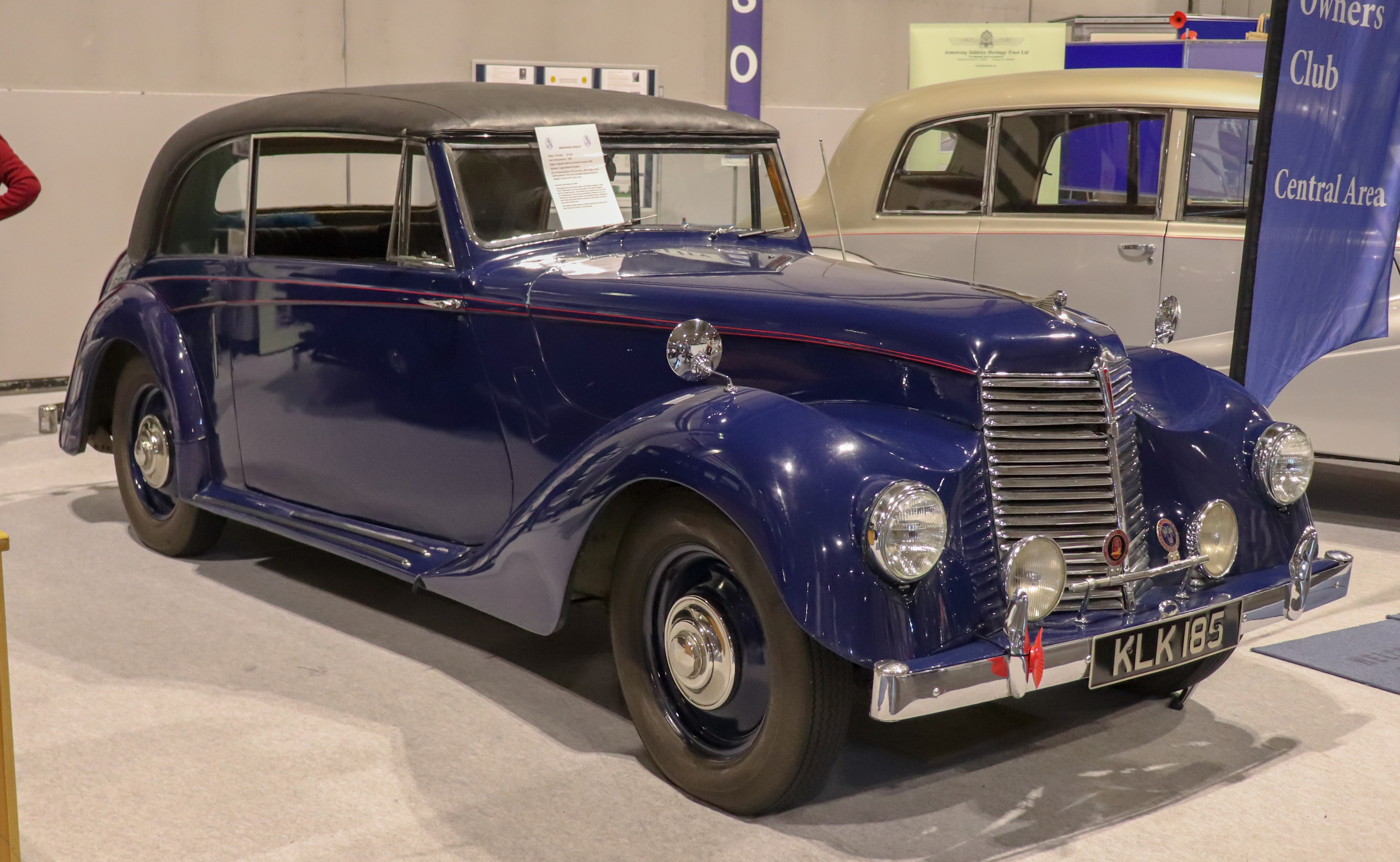
- Armstrong Siddeley Typhoon

Overview
- Manufacturer: Armstrong Siddeley Motors
- Production: 1946–1949; 1701 made

Body and chassis
- Body style: four-seat fixed-head coupé
- Related: Armstrong Siddeley Lancaster; Armstrong Siddeley Hurricane

Powertrain
- Engine: 1991 or 2309 cc Straight-6

Dimensions
- Wheelbase: 115 in (2,921 mm)
- Length: 188 in (4,775 mm)
- Width: 68 in (1,727 mm)

The Armstrong Siddeley Typhoon is a two-door, four-seat fixed-head coupé automobile produced by the British company Armstrong Siddeley from 1946 until 1949. It was based on the Armstrong Siddeley Lancaster saloon and continued the company's theme of naming cars after Hawker Siddeley World War II aircraft.

The chassis had independent front suspension using longitudinal torsion bars and a live rear axle with leaf springs. A Girling hydro-mechanical braking system was fitted, with the front drums hydraulically operated while those at the rear used rod and cable.

At first the Typhoon were fitted with a 70 bhp 1991 cc, six-cylinder, overhead-valve engine, carried over from the pre-war 16 hp model, but from 1949 this changed to 2309 cc and 75 bhp by increasing the cylinder bore from 65 to 70 mm. Hydraulic tappets were fitted to most engines, but towards the end of production there was a change to solid tappets. There was a choice of manual four-speed with synchromesh on the top three ratios or pre-selector gearbox.

The four-seat, two-door body was made of steel and aluminium panels fitted over a wood-and-aluminium frame with a fabric roof. The doors were rear hinged, an arrangement that got the name of suicide doors.

At launch, the car cost £1214 on the UK market.

== Armstrong Siddeley Tempest ==
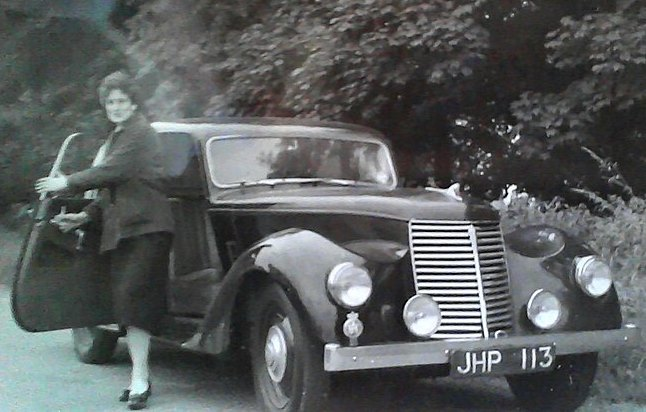
1949 Armstrong Siddeley Tempest

The Tempest was a very rare four-door variant and the prototype for the Whitley.

Six were built in 1949, but 5 were later recalled and destroyed by Armstrong Siddeley. The remaining one (registered JHP 113) passed into the private ownership of the late Les Clark of Ilkeston in Derbyshire, UK. It has a 2309cc engine, with a 4-speed pre-select gearbox. It is a 4-door saloon, the front doors being of a "suicide" design. The car is painted in midnight blue over grey (originally all black), and was in regular use until the early 1990s. Its whereabouts are now unknown, but is believed to be in storage in the UK, its ownership changing in June 2022.
