= Armstrong Siddeley Sapphire (motor car) =

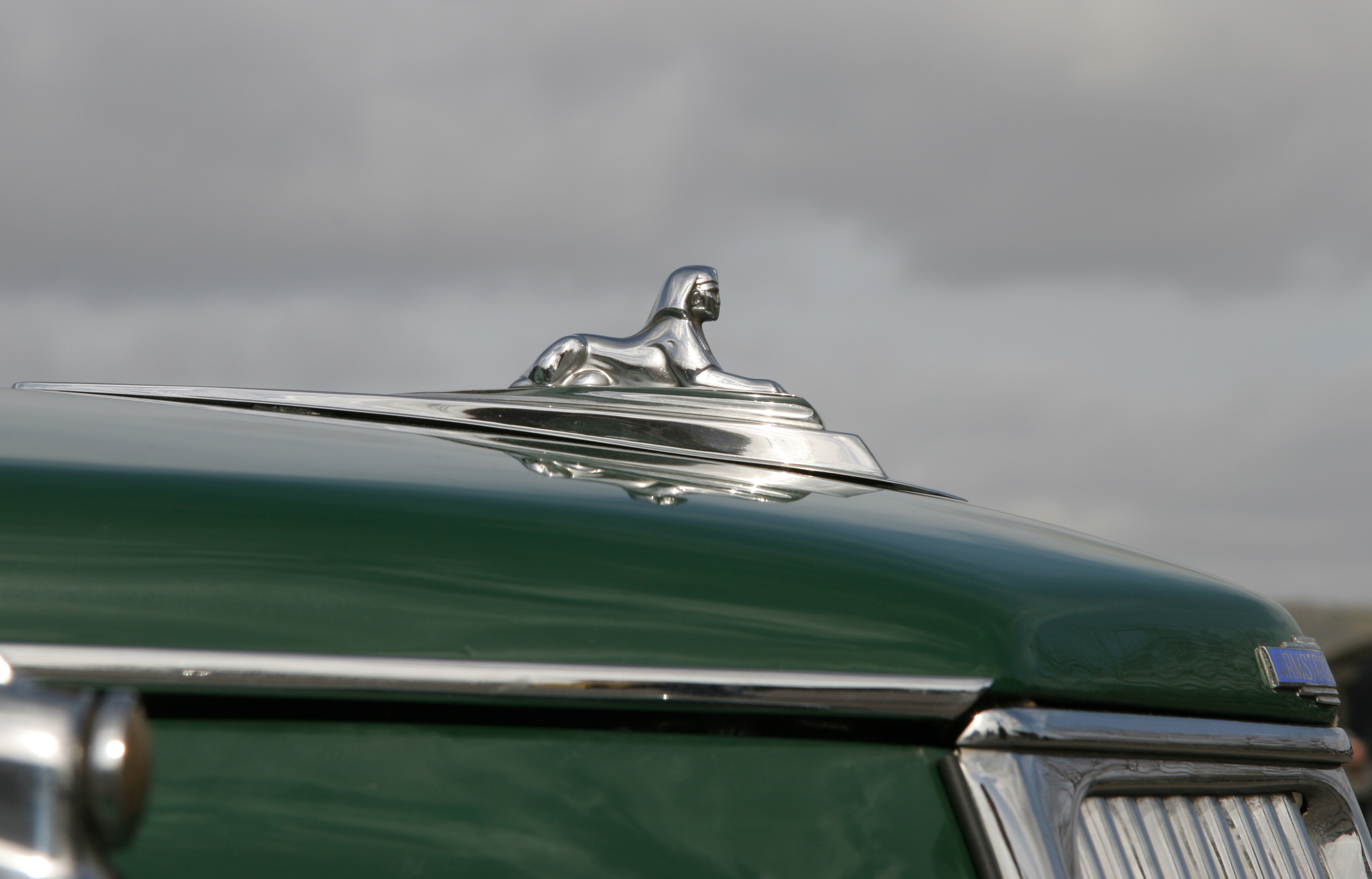
- Sphinx symbol of silence

Overview
- Manufacturer: Armstrong Siddeley Motors Limited
- Production: 1952–1960; 3½ litre 7,697; 4 litre 981; 2¼ litre 1,406; Total 10,084 built

Body and chassis
- Class: executive

Chronology
- Successor: none

The Armstrong Siddeley Sapphire is a large automobile that was made by the British company, Armstrong Siddeley, from 1952 to 1960.

A distinctive feature of the Sapphires is the traditional Armstrong Siddeley V-shaped radiator grille with the Sphinx motif mounted on it.

On some models, the sphinx has aircraft wings, with tiny Armstrong Siddeley Sapphire jet engines.

== 2.3-litre range ==
=== Sapphire 234 ===
Sapphire 234
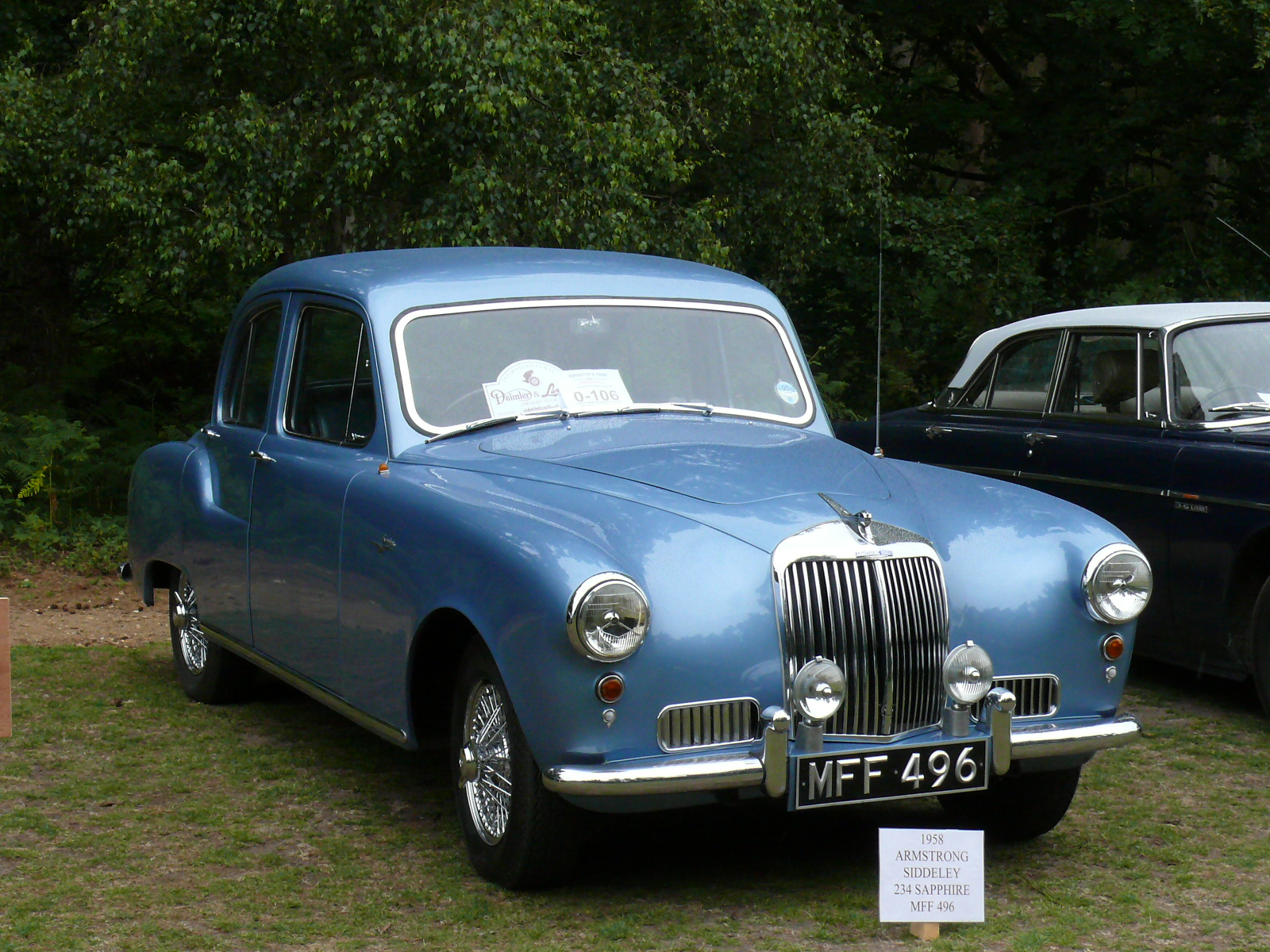
- Sapphire 234 sports saloon registered 1958

Overview
- Production: 1955–1958; 803 made

Body and chassis
- Body style: 4-door saloon
- Layout: Front-engine, rear-wheel drive
- Related: Sapphire 236

Powertrain
- Engine: 2,290 cc Straight-4
- Transmission: Manual with optional overdrive

Dimensions
- Wheelbase: 111 inches (2,819 mm)
- Length: 180 inches (4,572 mm)
- Width: 68.5 inches (1,734 mm)

The Sapphire 234 and 236 models are identical in appearance, but in spite of near identical displacements, they use different engines and have different performance characteristics. The sporting 234 was offered with wire wheels as an optional extra.

The 234 was made from 1955 to 1958. It has a four-cylinder, 2,290 cc version of the 346 engine. The transmission is a manual four-speed gearbox with optional overdrive. It was marketed as a 100 mph car for drivers who liked high performance. 803 were made.

Sapphire 234 engine

Overview
- Manufacturer: Armstrong Siddeley Motors Limited

Layout
- Configuration: 4-cylinder inline
- Displacement: 2,290 cubic centimetres (140 cu in)
- Cylinder bore: 90 mm (3.5 in)
- Piston stroke: 90 mm (3.5 in)
- Valvetrain: OHV
- Compression ratio: 7.5:1

Combustion
- Fuel system: twin SU carburettors
- Fuel type: Petrol
- Cooling system: Water

Output
- Power output: 120 bhp (89 kW; 120 PS)

=== Sapphire 236 ===
Sapphire 236
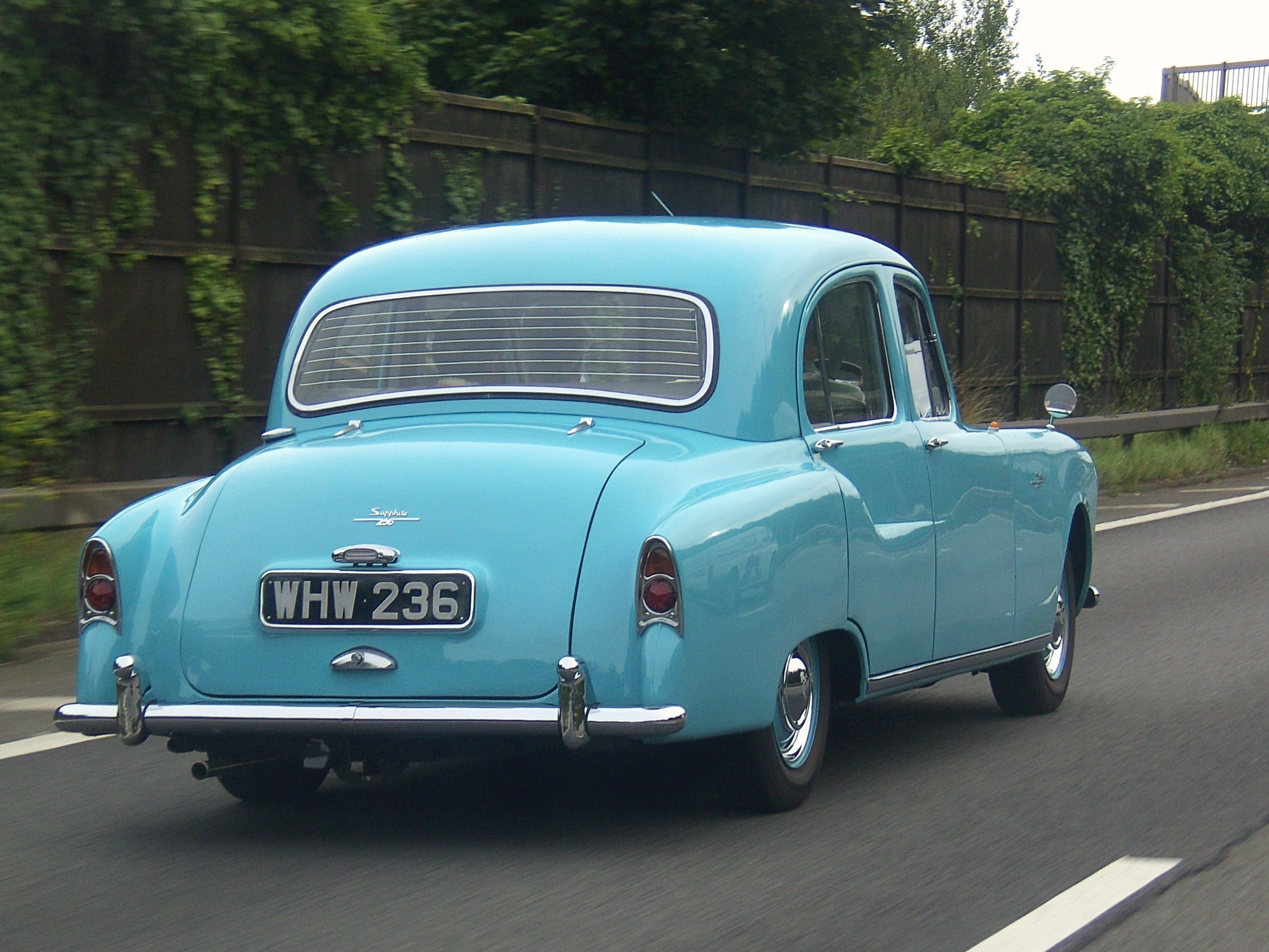
- Sapphire 236 saloon registered March 1956

Overview
- Production: 1955–1957; 603 made

Body and chassis
- Body style: 4-door saloon
- Layout: Front-engine, rear-wheel drive
- Related: Sapphire 234

Powertrain
- Engine: 2,309 cc 6-cylinder inline
- Transmission: Manumatic or Manual either with optional overdrive

Dimensions
- Wheelbase: 111 inches (2,819 mm)
- Length: 180 inches (4,572 mm)
- Width: 68.5 inches (1,734 mm)

Chronology
- Predecessor: Whitley

The 236 was made between 1955 and 1957, and has the six-cylinder 2,310 cc engine previously installed in the Armstrong Siddeley Whitley 18. A conventional manual gearbox was offered, but many were fitted with a Lockheed Manumatic "clutchless" transmission. Overdrive was an option on either transmission. This model, with an 85 mph top speed, was intended to be a quiet, flexible, easy-to-drive saloon. 603 were made.

Sapphire 236 engine

Overview
- Manufacturer: Armstrong Siddeley Motors Limited

Layout
- Configuration: 6-cylinder inline
- Displacement: 2,309 cubic centimetres (141 cu in)
- Cylinder bore: 70 mm (2.8 in)
- Piston stroke: 100 mm (3.9 in)
- Valvetrain: pushrod OHV
- Compression ratio: 7.5:1

Combustion
- Fuel system: Single downdraught Stromberg carburettor
- Fuel type: Petrol
- Cooling system: Water

Output
- Power output: 85 bhp (63 kW; 86 PS) @4500 rpm

== Six-cylinder range ==
=== Sapphire 346 ===
Sapphire 346
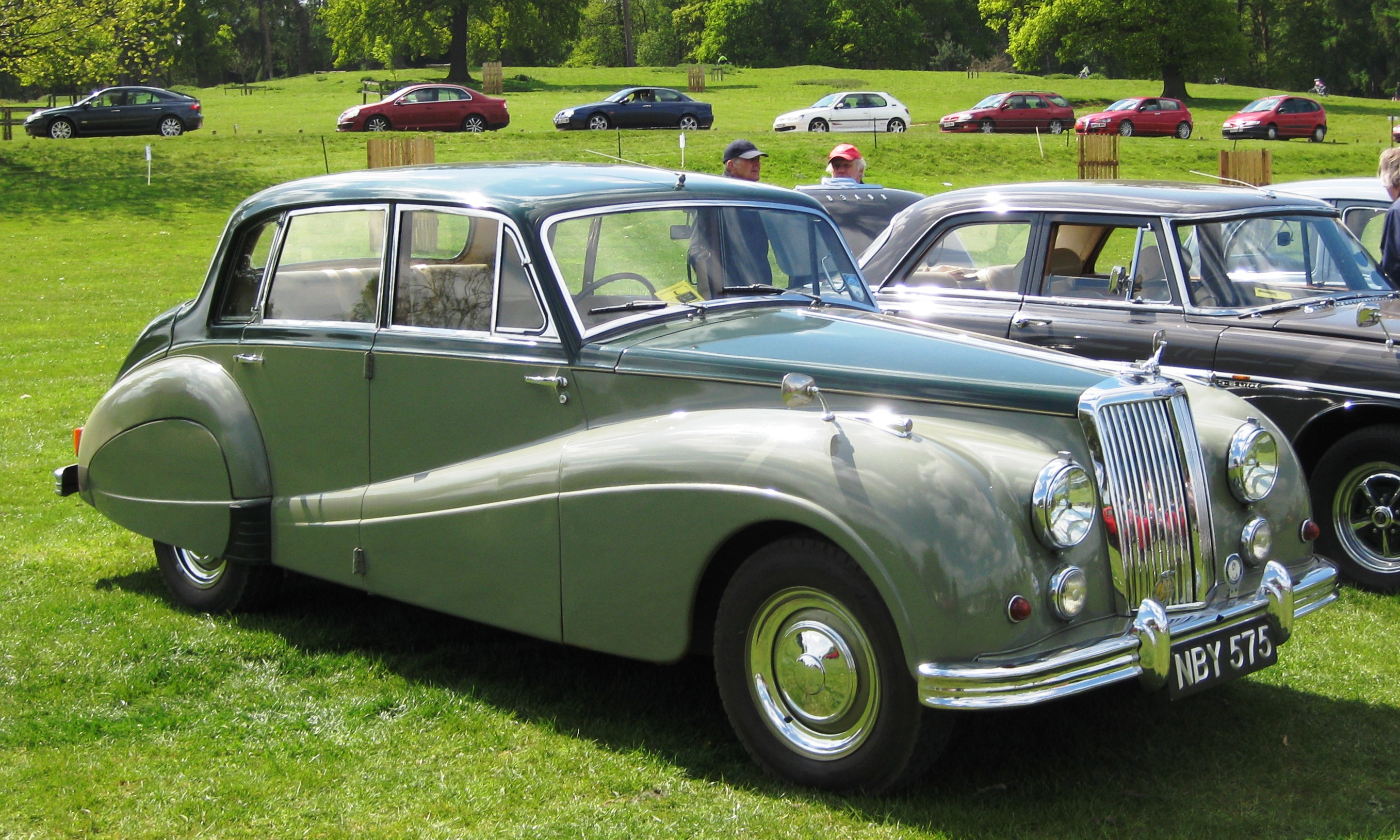

Overview
- Production: 1953–1958; 7,697 made

Body and chassis
- Body style: 4-door saloon limousine
- Layout: Front-engine, rear-wheel drive

Powertrain
- Engine: 3,435 cc 6-cylinder inline

Dimensions
- Wheelbase: 114 in (2,896 mm); 133 inches (3,378 mm) (limousine)
- Length: 193 in (4,902 mm); 212 in (5,385 mm) (limousine)
- Width: 72 in (1,829 mm)
- Height: 63 in (1,600 mm)

The 346 was the first of the Sapphire models. It was introduced late in 1952 for sale in 1953, and was made until 1958. The six-cylinder, 3,435 cc engine had hemispherical combustion chambers. Optional twin Stromberg carburettors, for £25 extra, increased the output from 125 to 150 bhp (93 to 112 kW), giving a top speed in excess of 100 mph (161 km/h). The front suspension is independent coil springs; the rear has a rigid axle with leaf springs. The Girling hydraulic brakes use 11 in (279 mm) drums all round.

The body was offered in four- or six-light versions (i.e., two or three windows on each side), at the same cost, and with either a bench front seat or individual front seats. The seats were finished in leather, with the dashboard and door-cappings in walnut veneer. A heater was standard.

The 346 was introduced with the option of a Wilson electrically-controlled finger-tip four-speed preselector gearbox for £30 extra, or a four-speed synchromesh gearbox. In 1954, the 346 Mark II was offered Rolls-Royce-made Hydramatic four-speed automatic transmission.

A long-wheelbase model was launched in 1955 as a limousine version. This had the pre-selector gearbox as standard, or four-speed manual column-change gearbox as an option. The chassis is 21 inches (535 mm) longer, and the body has a limousine division.

All cars for export to the US were fitted with twin carburettors.

A saloon with the optional twin-carburettors and synchromesh transmission, tested by the British magazine The Motor in 1953, achieved a top speed of 100.1 mph (161.1 km/h), and accelerated from 0–60 mph (97 km/h) in 13.0 seconds. A fuel consumption of 18.7 miles per imperial gallon (15.1 L/100 km; 15.6 mpg_{‑US}) was recorded. The test car cost £1,757 including taxes.

7,697 examples were made.

=== Star Sapphire ===
Star Sapphire
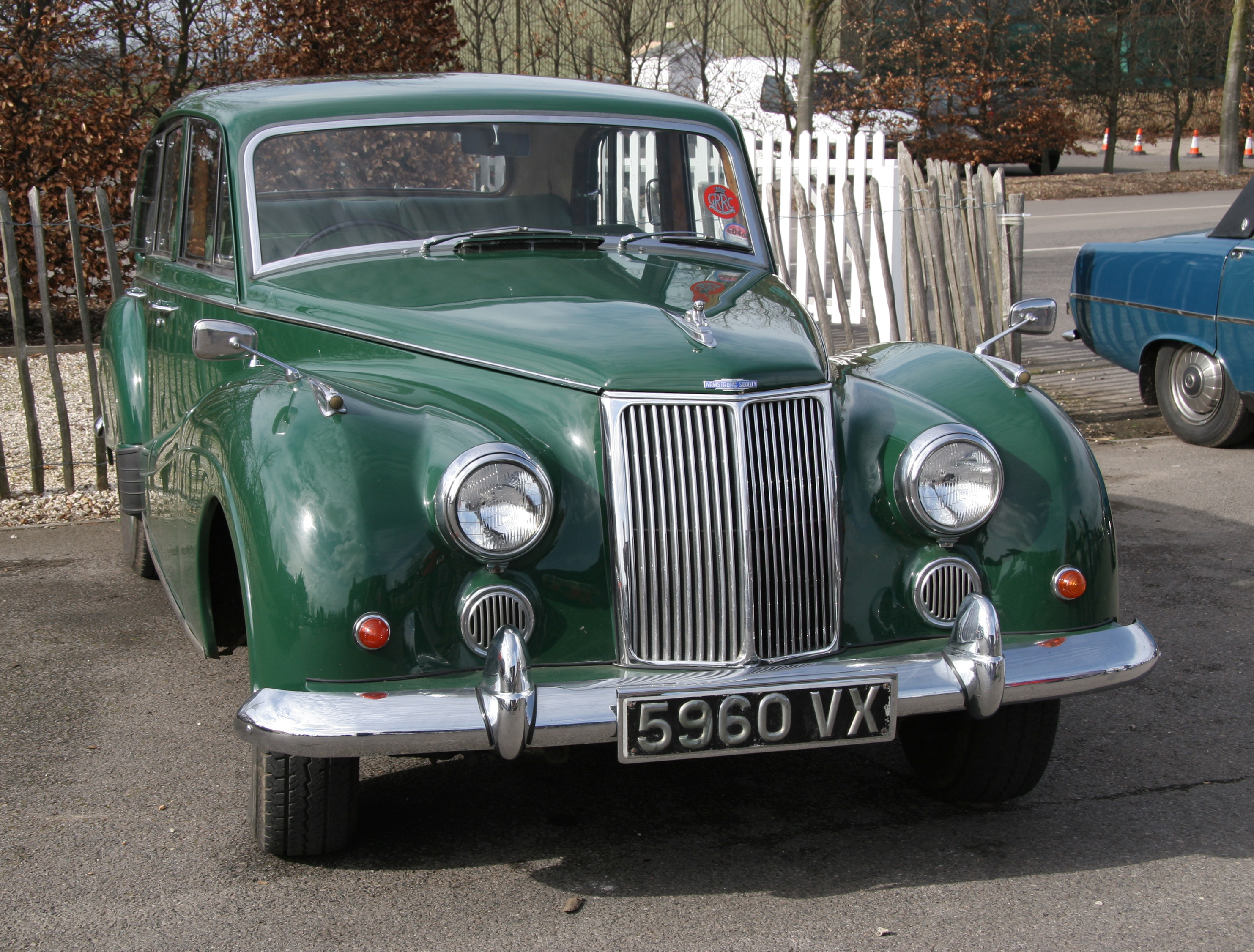

Overview
- Manufacturer: Armstrong Siddeley Motors Limited at Bristol Siddeley Engines Limited, Coventry
- Production: 1958–1960; 980 made

Body and chassis
- Body style: 4-door saloon limousine
- Layout: Front-engine, rear-wheel drive

Powertrain
- Engine: 3,990 cc 6-cylinder inline

Dimensions
- Wheelbase: 114 inches (2,896 mm); 135 inches (3,429 mm) (limousine)
- Length: 194 inches (4,928 mm); 212 inches (5,385 mm) (limousine)
- Width: 74 inches (1,880 mm)
- Height: 63.5 in (1,613 mm)

The Star Sapphire saloon was announced on 17 October 1958 and was made until summer 1960. It retains the previous model's commanding driving position. Though little changed externally, the radiator grille no longer rose to the top of the bonnet. Many refinements were incorporated.

The six-cylinder engine was enlarged by more than 16% to 3,990 cc. Twin Stromberg carburettors were standard, and power output increased to [SAE] 165 bhp (167 hp, 123 kW), or [DIN] 145 bhp (147 hp, 108 kW). There was an increase of nearly 30% in torque at 50 mph. The big-end and main bearings were now made of lead-indium, and a vibration damper was fitted to the nose of the crankshaft. The compression ratio was raised to 7.5-to-1. The car could now lap the Lindley high-speed track at 104 mph.

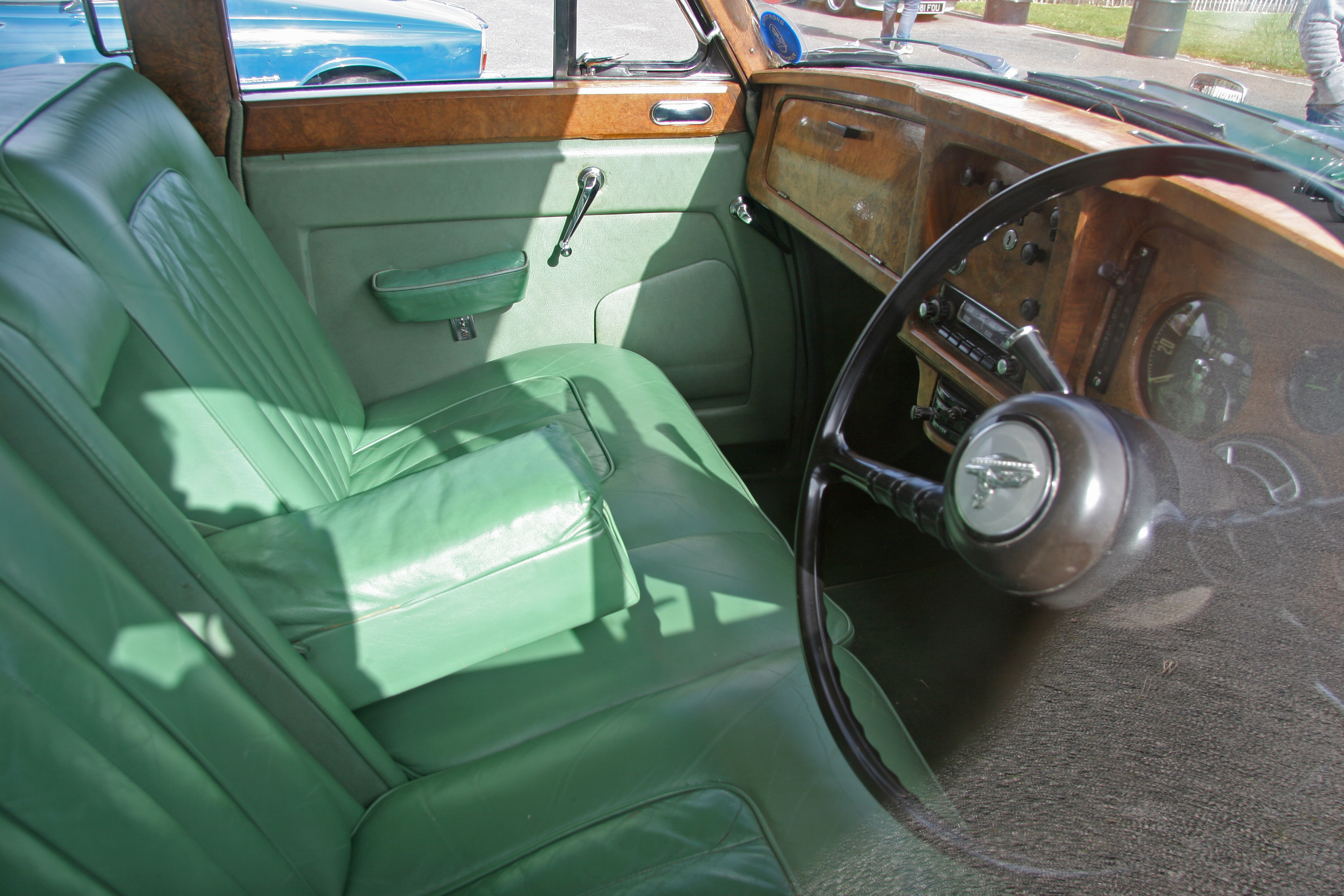
Interior of the Star Sapphire saloon

Various suspension modifications were included. The front brakes are servo-assisted 12 in (305 mm) Girling discs, and Burman recirculating ball-power steering was standardised, reducing the turning circle by 4'6". A Borg-Warner–type DG automatic gearbox was fitted, incorporating a lever on the fascia to hold an intermediate gear at 35, 45, 55, and 65 m.p.h.

Door hinges were concealed, and the front doors hinged at their leading edge. There was an independent heater for the rear passengers and de-misting slots for the rear window. All features were standard, as the provision of alternatives was believed to lead to an unsatisfactory compromise.

902 saloons were made, plus 77 long-wheelbase cars, 73 of which were built as limousines (including two prototypes). The limousine version was made only in 1960, has a single-carburettor engine, and inmost cases a manual gearbox. The automatic gearbox was fitted to 12 examples. The remaining four chassis were used for three hearses and an ambulance. 980 Star Sapphires were made.

The Star Sapphire won the £4,000 four-door coachwork class at the 1958 Earls Court Motor Show, ahead of an Austin Princess limousine and a Jaguar Mark IX.

A Star Sapphire saloon with automatic transmission was tested by the British magazine The Motor in 1959. It achieved a top speed of 99.6 mph (160.3 km/h), and accelerated from 0–60 mph (97 km/h) in 14.8 seconds. A fuel consumption of 15.4 miles per imperial gallon (18.3 L/100 km; 12.8 mpg_{‑US}) was recorded. The test car cost £2,498, including £735 taxes. Purchase tax had been reduced by one-sixth on 8 April 1959.

Prices including tax October 1958

- £2,646 Star Sapphire
- £2,492 Daimler Majestic
- £2,163 Jaguar Mark IX with automatic transmission
- £1,939 Jaguar XK150
- £1,666 Humber Super Snipe with automatic transmission

==== Star Sapphire Mk II ====
The Mk II version (1960) did not proceed beyond prototype stage; only one was produced. It was fitted with the same four-litre six-cylinder engine as the original Star Sapphire.

== In film and books ==
- Diamonds Are Forever by Ian Fleming
  In chapter 6, 'In Transit', James Bond is picked up from The Ritz Hotel, London by a chauffeur-driven black Armstrong Siddeley Sapphire. The year and mark of the car are not noted, but the novel was published in 1956. The car had red dealer plates.
- 1956 British film Wicked as They Come
  Kathy Allen, played by Arlene Dahl, is picked up from London Airport and dropped off at The May Fair Hotel in a black Armstrong Siddeley limousine.
- 1955 British film The Flaw. Paul Oliveri, played by John Bentley, drives an Armstrong Siddeley Sapphire.
