= Contra-rotating propellers =

Two-propeller design for improving low-airspeed maneuverability

Contra-rotating propellers

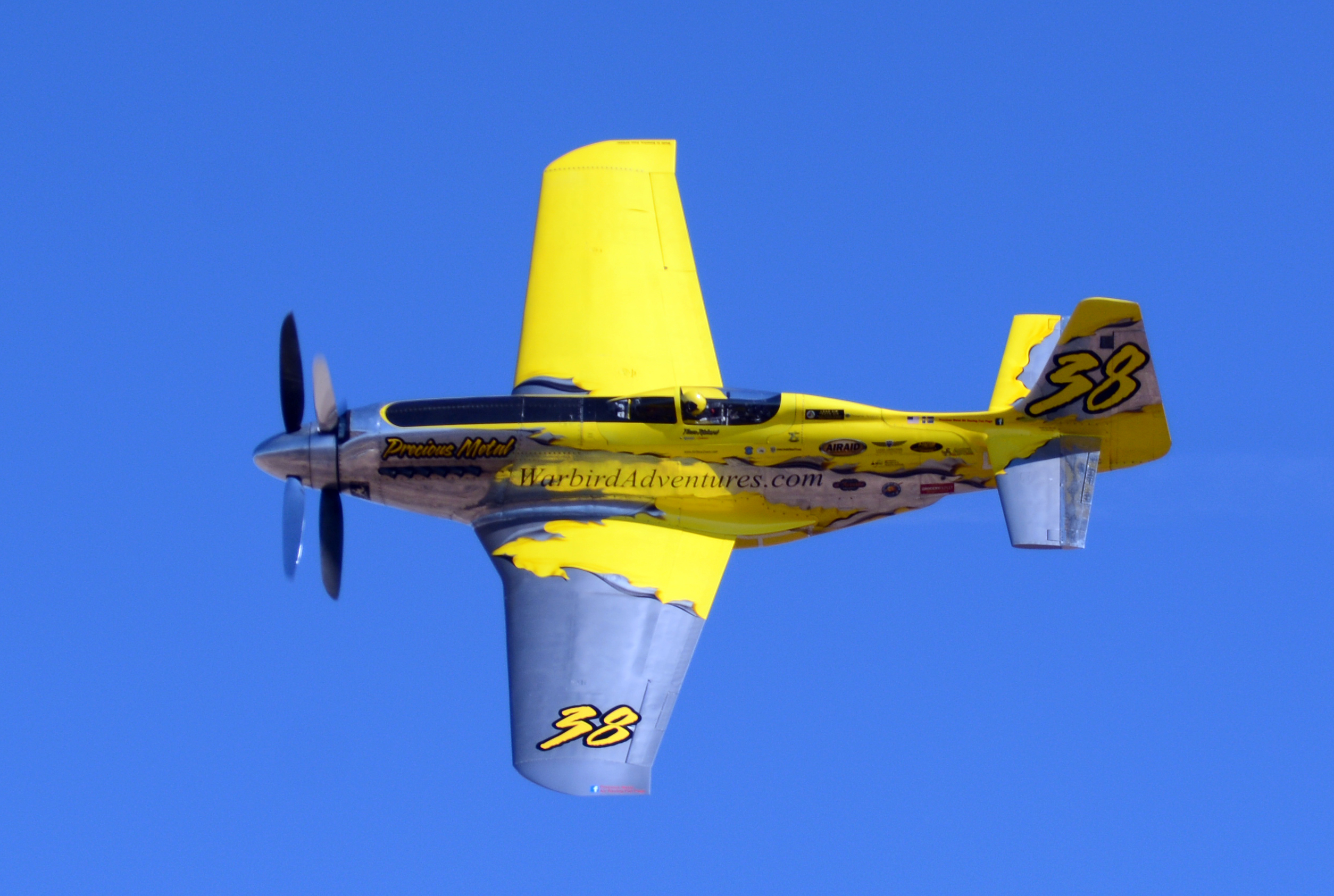
Contra-rotating propellers on the Rolls-Royce Griffon-powered P-51XR Mustang Precious Metal at the 2014 Reno Air Races

Contra-rotating propellers (CRP) are two coaxial propellers arranged one behind the other in contra-rotation. Power is transferred from a piston powered or turboprop engine via a planetary gear or spur gear transmission. Also known as coaxial contra-rotating propellers, or high-speed propellers, contra-rotating propellers are sometimes referred to as counter-rotating propellers, though the term is much more widely used when referring to propellers on separate non-coaxial shafts turning in opposite directions.

== Operation ==
When airspeed is low, the mass of the air flowing through the propeller disk (thrust) causes a significant amount of tangential or rotational air flow to be created by the spinning blades. The energy of this tangential air flow is wasted in a single-propeller design, and causes handling problems at low speed as the air strikes the vertical stabilizer, causing the aircraft to yaw left or right, depending on the direction of propeller rotation. To use this wasted effort, the placement of a second propeller behind the first takes advantage of the disturbed airflow.

A well designed contra-rotating propeller will have no rotational air flow, pushing a maximum amount of air uniformly through the propeller disk, resulting in high performance and low induced energy loss. It also serves to counter the asymmetrical torque effect of a conventional propeller (see P-factor). Some contra-rotating systems were designed to be used at takeoff for maximum power and efficiency under such conditions, and allowing one of the propellers to be disabled during cruise to extend flight time.

== Advantages and disadvantages ==
The torque on the aircraft from a pair of contra-rotating propellers effectively cancels out.

Contra-rotating propellers have shown efficiency gains of about 8% in tractor installations and up to 16% in pusher installations.

However, they can generate strong interaction tones, with increases in some axial (forward and aft) sound-pressure measurements of up to 30 dB, and about 10 dB tangentially. Most of this extra noise can be found in the higher harmonics. These noise problems can limit commercial applications. Noise can be reduced by lowering tip speed or blade loading, using fewer blades or a smaller diameter on the aft propeller, or increasing the spacing between the fore and aft propellers.

Contra-rotating propeller systems can be mechanically more complex than single-rotation installations because of their gearbox, drivetrain and propeller arrangements. Advanced counter-rotating systems have also been developed with lighter and more efficient gearing; one single-stage differential planetary gearbox was projected to be 15% lighter and 0.2 percentage point more efficient than the corresponding single-rotation turboprop gearbox. Contra-rotating propellers and rotors have been used on several military aircraft, including the Tupolev Tu-95 "Bear", Avro Shackleton and Fairey Gannet.

They are also being examined for use in airliners.

== Use in aircraft ==
While several nations experimented with contra-rotating propellers in aircraft, only the United Kingdom and Soviet Union produced them in large numbers. The first aircraft to be fitted with a contra-rotating propeller to fly was in the US when two inventors from Fort Worth, Texas, tested the concept on an aircraft.

=== United Kingdom ===
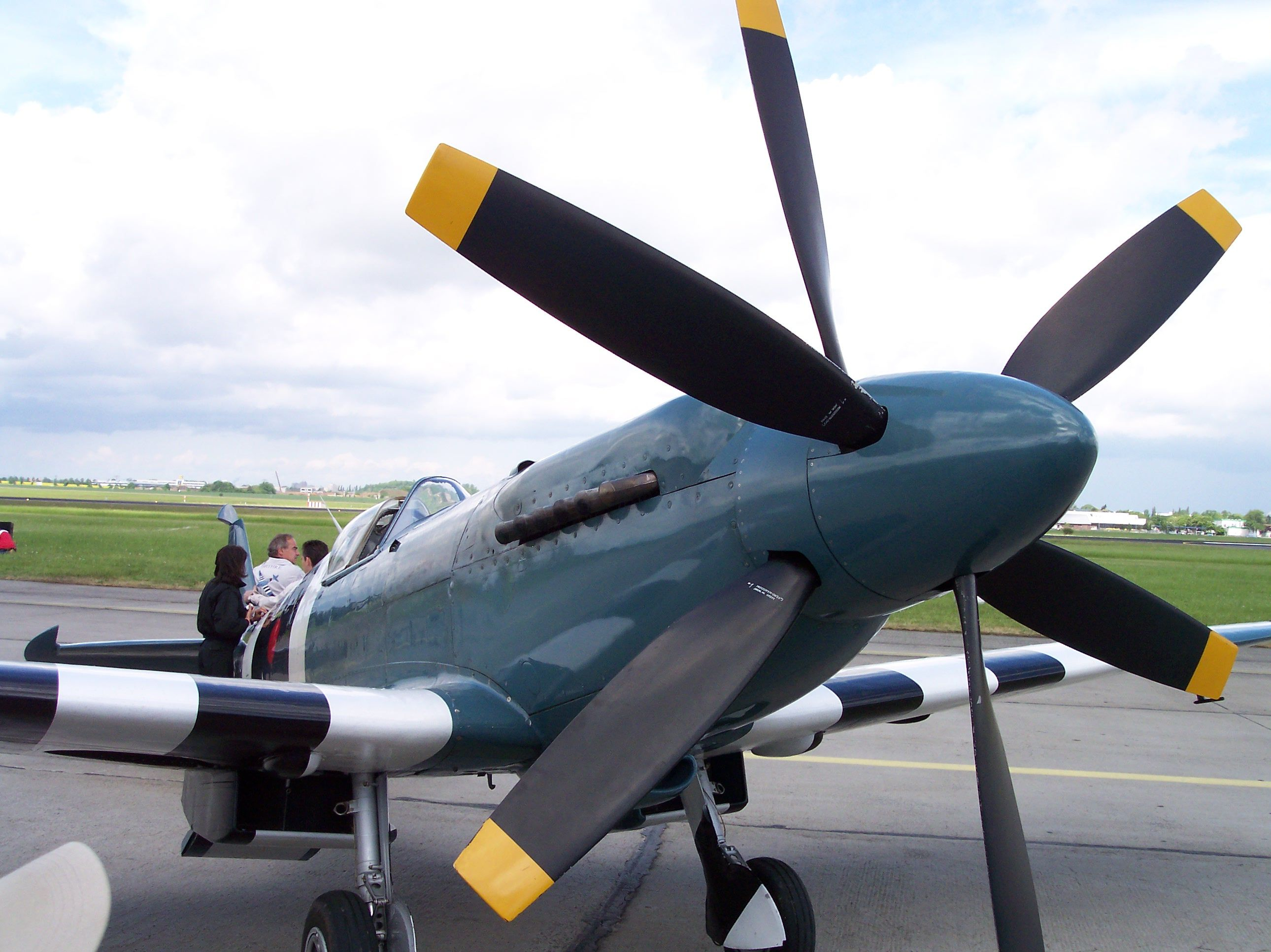
Contra-rotating propellers of a Spitfire Mk XIX

A contra-rotating propeller was patented by F. W. Lanchester in 1907.

Some of the more successful British aircraft with contra-rotating propellers are the Avro Shackleton, powered by the Rolls-Royce Griffon engine, and the Fairey Gannet, which used the Double Mamba Mk.101 engine. In the Double Mamba two separate power sections drove one propeller each, allowing one power section (engine) to be shut down in flight, increasing endurance.

Another naval aircraft, the Westland Wyvern had contra-rotating propellers. The Martin-Baker MB 5 test aircraft also used this propeller type.

Later variants of the Supermarine Seafire used the Griffon with contra-rotating props, after testing of the configuration had been undertaken on a Supermarine Spitfire. In the Spitfire/Seafire and Shackleton's case the primary reason for using contra-rotating propellers was to increase the propeller blade-area, and hence absorb greater engine power, within a propeller diameter limited by the height of the aircraft's undercarriage. The Short Sturgeon used two Merlin 140s with contra-rotating propellers.

The Bristol Brabazon prototype airliner used eight Bristol Centaurus engines driving four pairs of contra-rotating propellers, each engine driving a single propeller.

The post-war SARO Princess prototype flying boat airliner also had eight of its ten engines driving contra-rotating propellers.

=== USSR, Russia and Ukraine ===
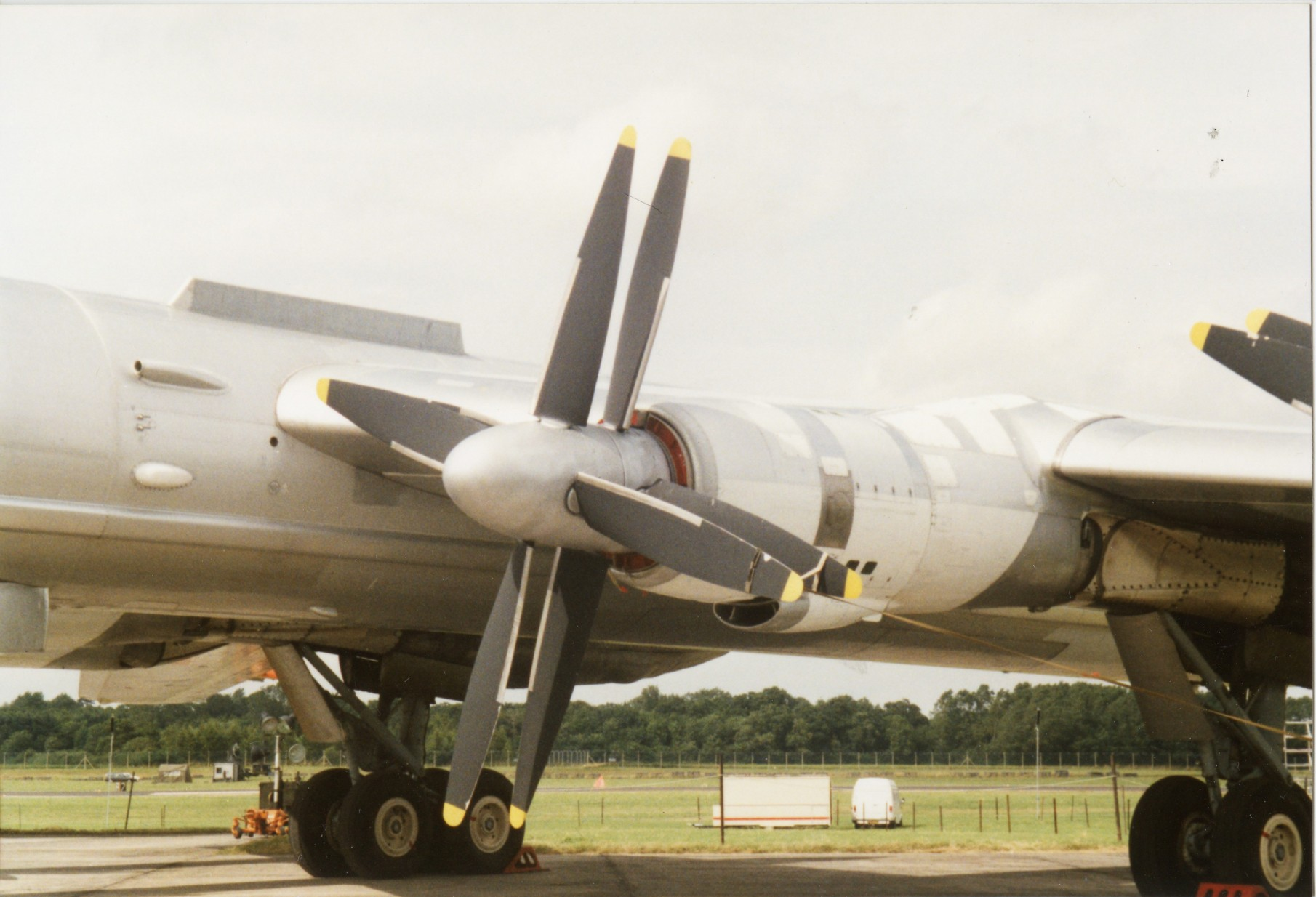
One of the four contra-rotating propellers on a Tu-95 Russian strategic bomber

In the 1950s, the Soviet Union's Kuznetsov Design Bureau developed the NK-12 turboprop. It drives an eight-blade contra-rotating propeller and, at 15,000 shaft horsepower (11,000 kilowatts), it is the most powerful turboprop in service. Four NK-12 engines power the Tupolev Tu-95 Bear, the only turboprop bomber to enter service, as well as one of the fastest propeller-driven aircraft. The Tu-114, an airliner derivative of the Tu-95, holds the world speed record for propeller aircraft. The Tu-95 was also the first Soviet bomber to have intercontinental range. The Tu-126 AEW aircraft and Tu-142 maritime patrol aircraft are two more NK-12 powered designs derived from the Tu-95.

The NK-12 engine powers another well-known Soviet aircraft, the Antonov An-22 Antheus, a heavy-lift cargo aircraft. At the time of its introduction, the An-22 was the largest aircraft in the world and is still, by far, the world's largest turboprop-powered aircraft. From the 1960s through the 1970s, it set several world records in the categories of maximum payload-to-height ratio and maximum payload lifted to altitude.

Of lesser note is the use of the NK-12 engine in the A-90 Orlyonok, a mid-size Soviet ekranoplan. The A-90 uses one NK-12 engine mounted at the top of its T-tail, along with two turbofans installed in the nose.

In the 1980s, Kuznetsov continued to develop powerful contra-rotating engines. The NK-110, which was tested in the late 1980s, had a contra-rotating propeller configuration with four blades in front and four in back, like the NK-12. Its 190-inch propeller diameter (4.7-metre) was smaller than the NK-12's 220–240 in (5.6–6.2 m) diameter, but it produced a power output of 21,007 hp (15,665 kW), delivering a takeoff thrust of 40,000 pounds-force (177 kilonewtons). Even more powerful was the NK-62, which was in development throughout most of the decade. The NK-62 had an identical propeller diameter and blade configuration to the NK-110, but it offered a higher takeoff thrust of 55,000 lbf (245 kN). The associated NK-62M had a takeoff thrust of 64,100 lbf (285.2 kN), and it could deliver 70,700 lbf (314.7 kN) of emergency thrust. Unlike the NK-12, however, these later engines were not adopted by any of the aircraft design bureaus.

In 1994, Antonov produced the An-70, a heavy transport aircraft. It is powered by four Progress D-27 propfan engines driving contra-rotating propellers. The characteristics of the D-27 engine and its propeller make it a propfan, a hybrid between a turbofan engine and a turboprop engine.

=== United States ===
XB-35 Flying Wing showing its quartet of pusher contra-rotating propellers. The option was later discarded due to severe vibration in flight and later changed to traditional single rotating propellers.

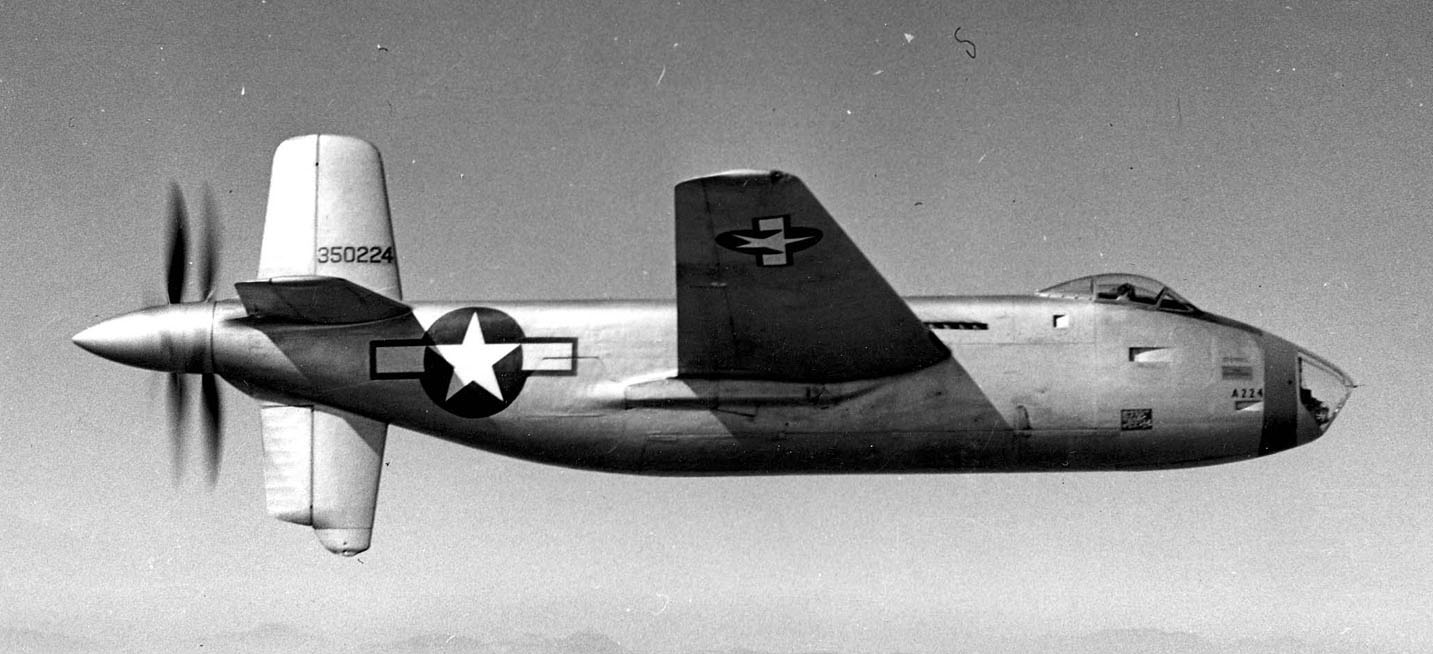
Douglas XB-42 Mixmaster

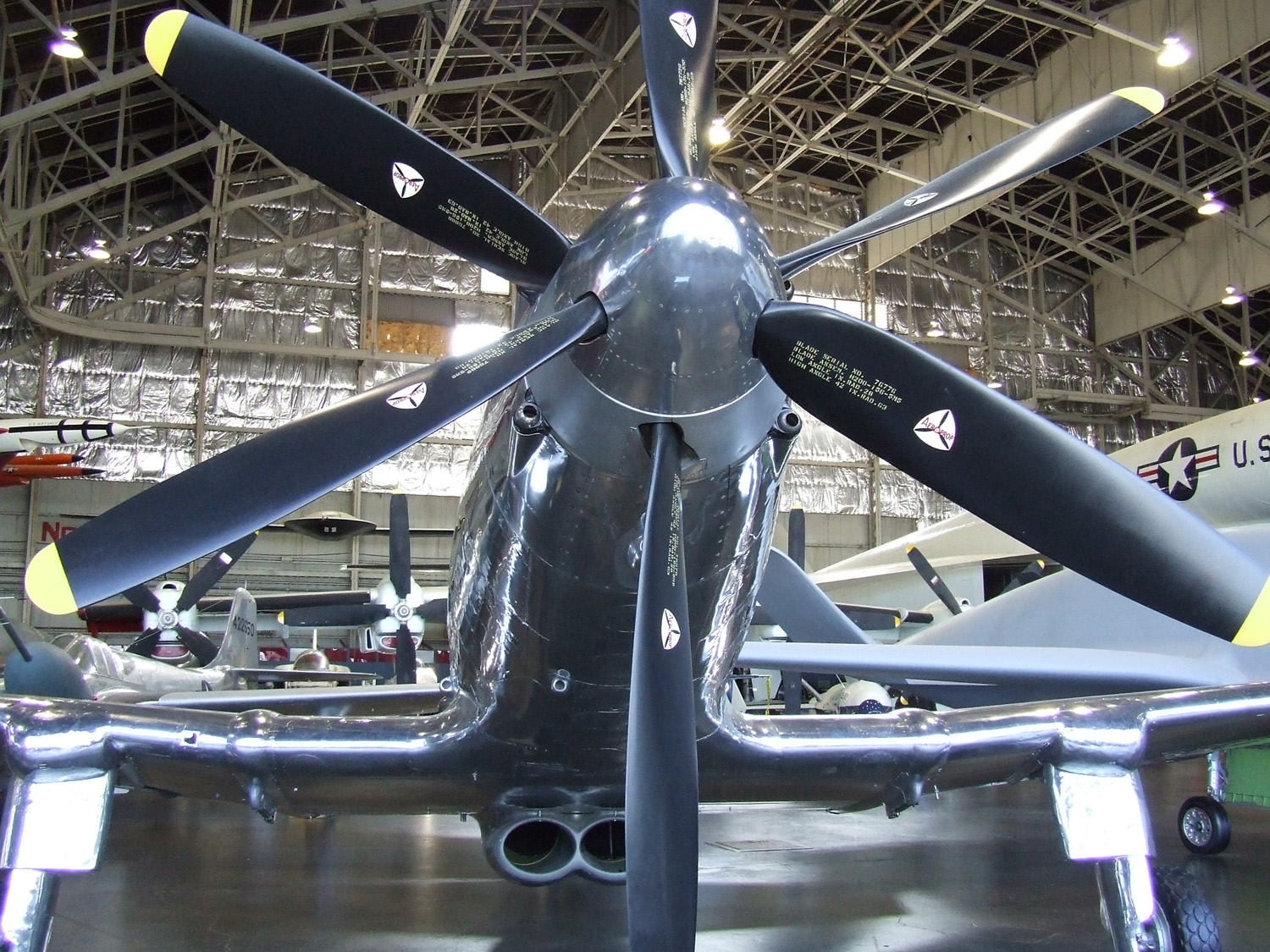
General Motors P-75 Eagle

The United States worked with several prototypes, including the Northrop XB-35, XB-42 Mixmaster, the Douglas XTB2D Skypirate, the Curtiss XBTC, the A2J Super Savage, the Boeing XF8B, the XP-56 Black Bullet, the Fisher P-75 Eagle, and the tail-sitting Convair XFY "Pogo" and Lockheed XFV "Salmon" VTOL fighters, and the Hughes XF-11 reconnaissance plane. The Convair R3Y Tradewind flying boat entered service with contra-rotating propellers. However, both piston-engined and turboprop-powered propeller-driven aircraft were reaching their zenith and new technological developments such as the advent of the pure turbojet and turbofan engines, both without propellers, meant that the designs were quickly eclipsed.

The US propeller manufacturer, Hamilton Standard, bought a Fairey Gannet in 1983 to study the effects of counter rotation on propeller noise and blade vibratory stresses. The Gannet was particularly suitable because the independently-driven propellers provided a comparison between counter and single rotation.

=== Ultralight applications ===
An Austrian company, Sun Flightcraft, distributes a contra-rotating gearbox for use on Rotax 503 and 582 engines on ultralight and microlight aircraft. The Coax-P was developed by Hans Neudorfer of NeuraJet and allows powered hang-gliders and parachutes to develop 15 to 20 percent more power while reducing torque moments. The manufacturer also reports reduced noise levels from dual contra-rotating props using the Coax-P gearbox.

== See also ==
- Coaxial-rotor aircraft
- Contra-rotating marine propellers
- Toroidal propeller ("looped propeller")
