= NeuraJet =

Austrian aircraft manufacturer

- Company type: Privately held company
- Industry: Aerospace
- Founded: January 2002
- Founder: Hans Neudorfer
- Defunct: 2006
- Fate: Out of business
- Headquarters: Senftenbach, Austria
- Key people: Hans Neudorfer & Annemarie Humer
- Products: Paramotors

NeuraJet was an Austrian aircraft manufacturer based in Senftenbach and founded by Hans Neudorfer. The company employees were Neudorfer & Annemarie Humer. It specialized in the design and manufacture of paramotors in the form of ready-to-fly aircraft for the US FAR 103 Ultralight Vehicles rules and the European microlight category.

The company was founded in January 2002 and seems to have gone out of business in 2006.

Neudorfer is a professional electrical engineer who holds 15 patents. He previously founded Neura Electronics Heat Pumps and sold that company in 2001 to concentrate on paramotor design. Neudorfer personally designed and assembled each paramotor built by the company.

Neudorfer, along with Herbert Hofbauer of Sun Flightcraft, developed the Coax-P, a contra-rotating propeller system for the Rotax 503 and Rotax 582 engines.

The company's sole aircraft design was the NeuraJet Neura Jet paramotor, powered by a Husqvarna Group single cylinder, two-stroke, air-cooled chainsaw engine. The design was noted for its dedication to lightness and weighed in at 13 kg (29 lb).

== Aircraft ==
Summary of aircraft built by NeuraJet
Model name	First flight	Number built	Type
NeuraJet Neura Jet	2002		paramotor
