= Armstrong Siddeley Double Mamba =

1940s British turboprop aircraft engine

Double Mamba
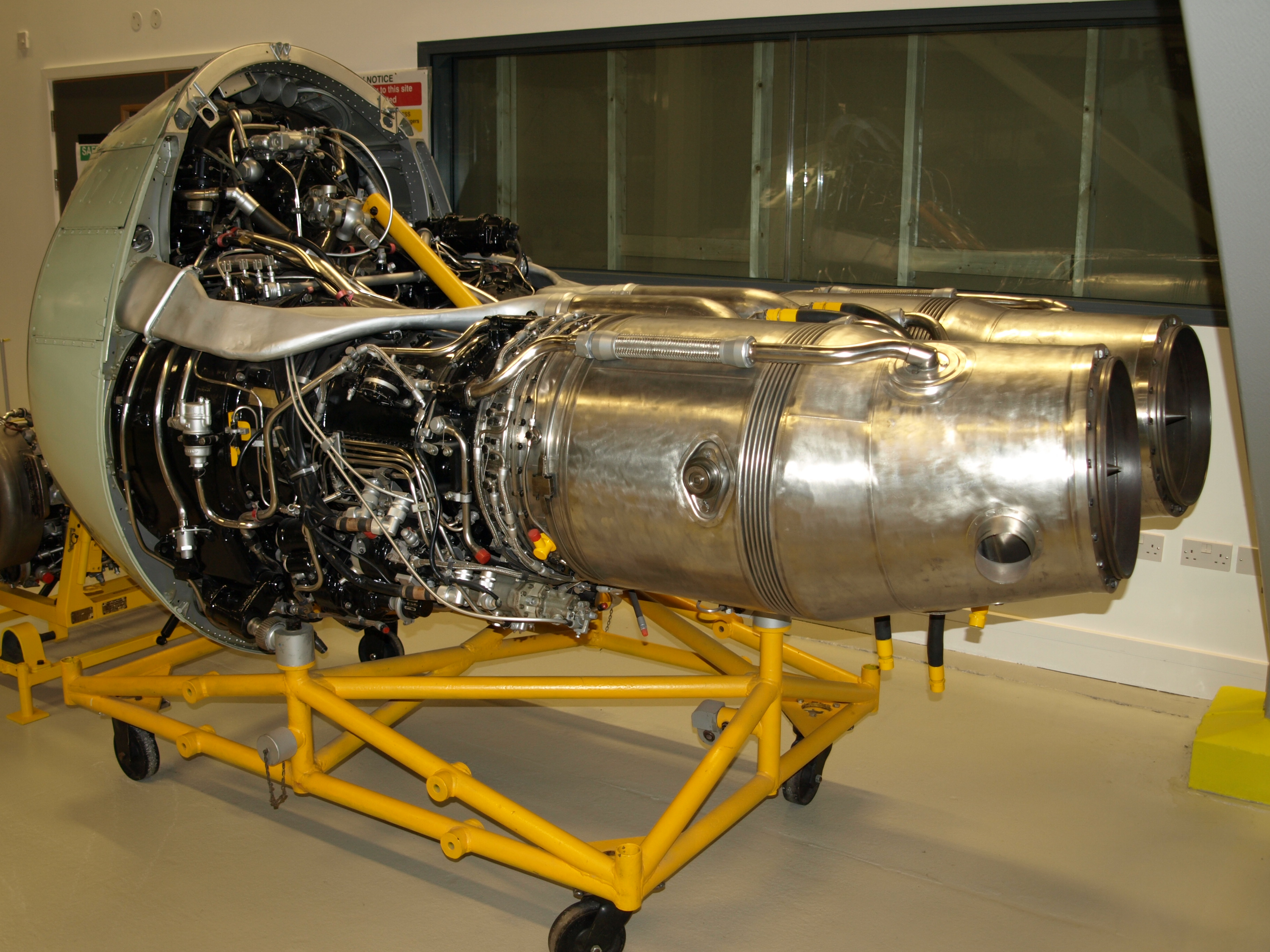
- Preserved Double Mamba at the Imperial War Museum Duxford
- Type: Turboprop
- Manufacturer: Armstrong Siddeley
- First run: 29 September 1949 (First flight)
- Major applications: Fairey Gannet
- Developed from: Armstrong Siddeley Mamba

The Armstrong Siddeley Double Mamba is a turboprop engine design developed in the late 1940s which generated around 3,000–4,000 hp (2,200–3,000 kW). It was used mostly on the Fairey Gannet anti-submarine aircraft developed for the Fleet Air Arm of the Royal Navy.

== Design and development ==
The Double Mamba (rarely known as the Twin Mamba) was a development of the Armstrong Siddeley Mamba with two Mambas driving contra-rotating propellers through a combining gearbox.

Engine starting was by cartridge; forced air restart was possible in flight. One engine could be shut down in flight to conserve fuel. Shutting down one engine also stopped one of the propellers.

== Variants ==
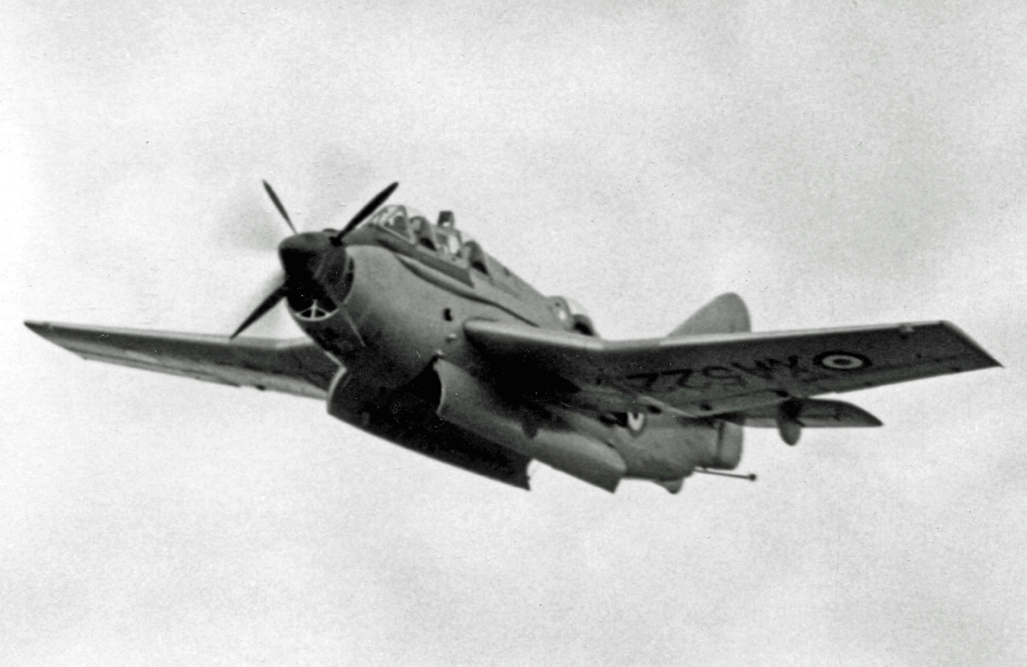
Fairey Gannet flying with one half of its Double Mamba engine shut down

ASMD.1
2,950 shp (2,200 kW) (2 x ASMa.3) used on Fairey Gannet A.S. Mk.1 and Blackburn B-88
ASMD.3
3,145 shp (2,345 kW) (2 x ASMa.5) used on Fairey Gannet A.S. Mk.4
ASMD.4
3,875 hp (2,890 kW) (2 x ASMa.6) used on Fairey Gannet AEW Mk.3
ASMD.8
3,875 hp (2,890 kW) (2 x ASMa.6) used on Fairey Gannet AEW Mk.3

== Applications ==
- Blackburn B-88
- Fairey Gannet
- Fairey Gannet AEW

The Double Mamba engine was also proposed for the Westland Westminster, a 30-seat helicopter that was later built as a prototype powered by a pair of Napier Eland E220 turboshaft engines.

== Engines on display ==
Preserved Double Mamba engines are on public display at the:

- Australian National Aviation Museum
- Deutsches Museum Flugwerft Schleissheim
- Gatwick Aviation Museum
- South Yorkshire Aircraft Museum
- Imperial War Museum Duxford
- Midland Air Museum
- Queensland Air Museum
- East Midlands Aeropark
- Museum of Berkshire Aviation

== Specifications (ASMD.3) ==
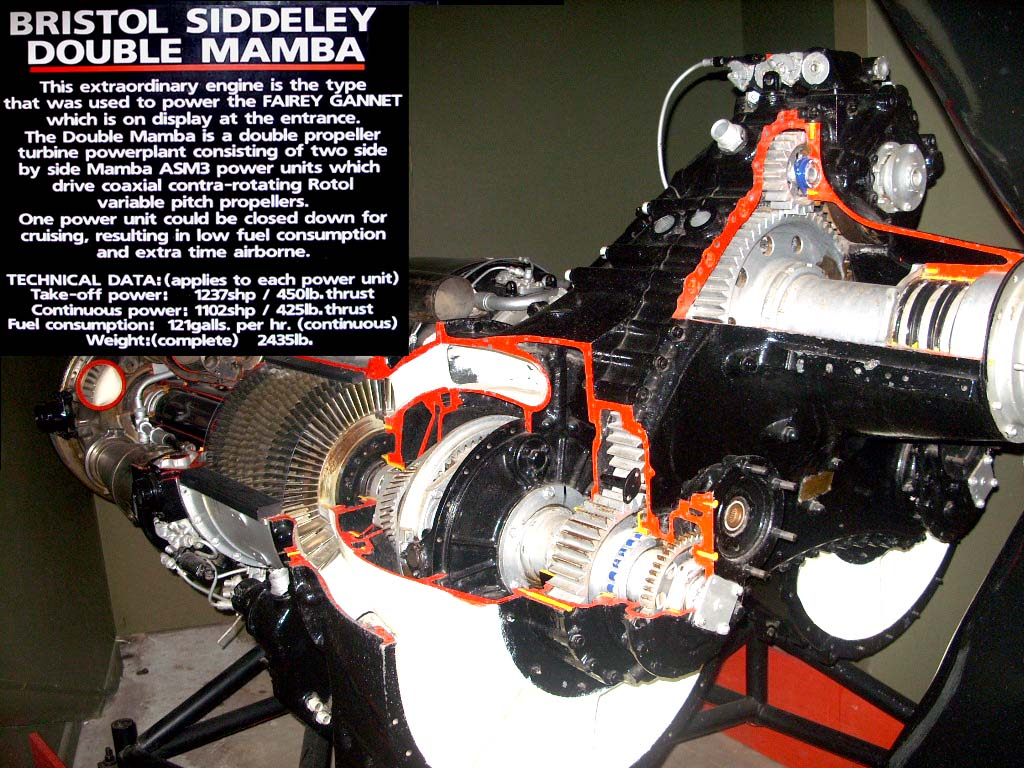
Cut away of a double mamba power unit at The Flambards Experience in Cornwall

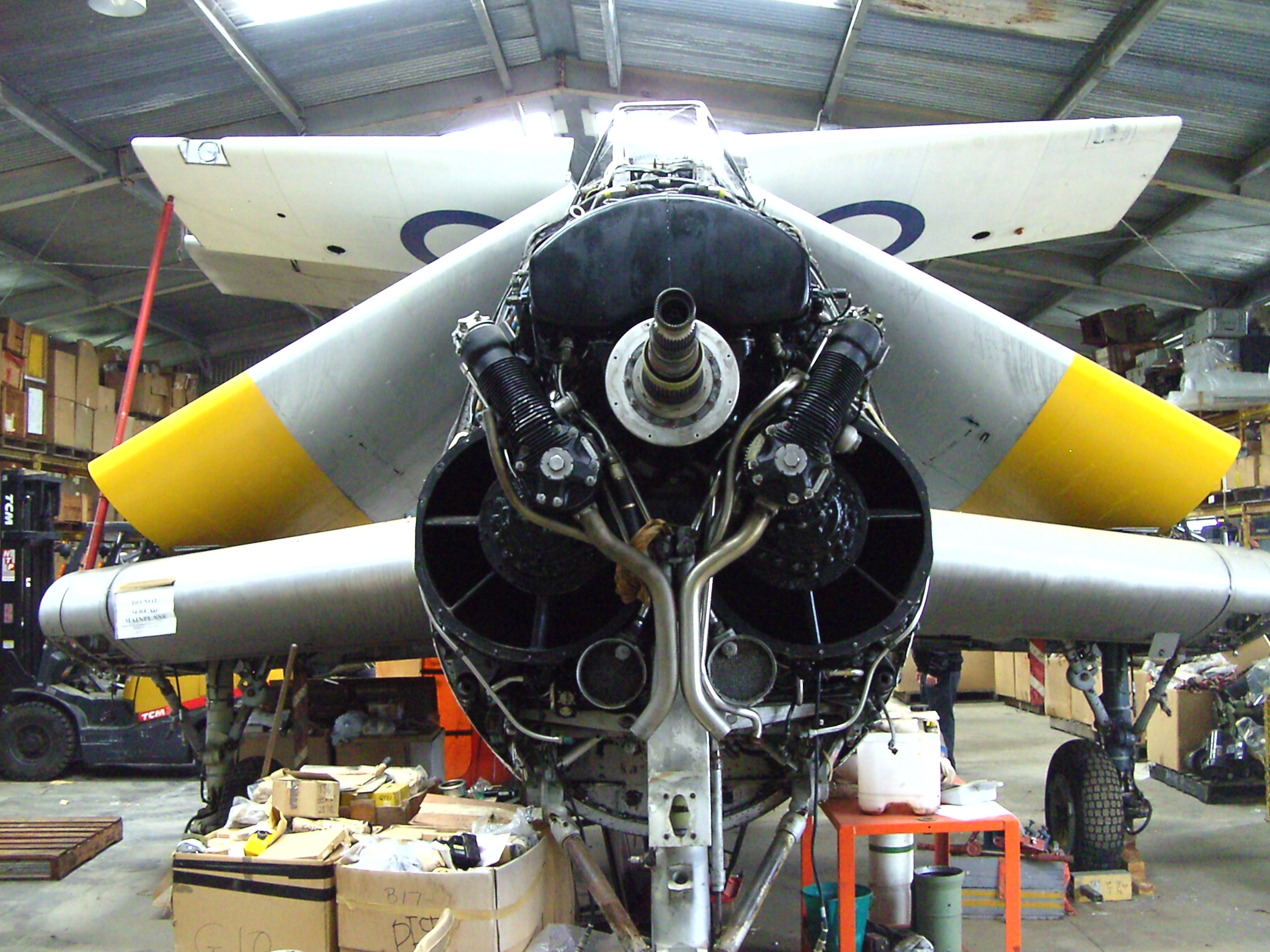
Double Mamba in a non-display aircraft at the Fleet Air Arm Museum (Australia).

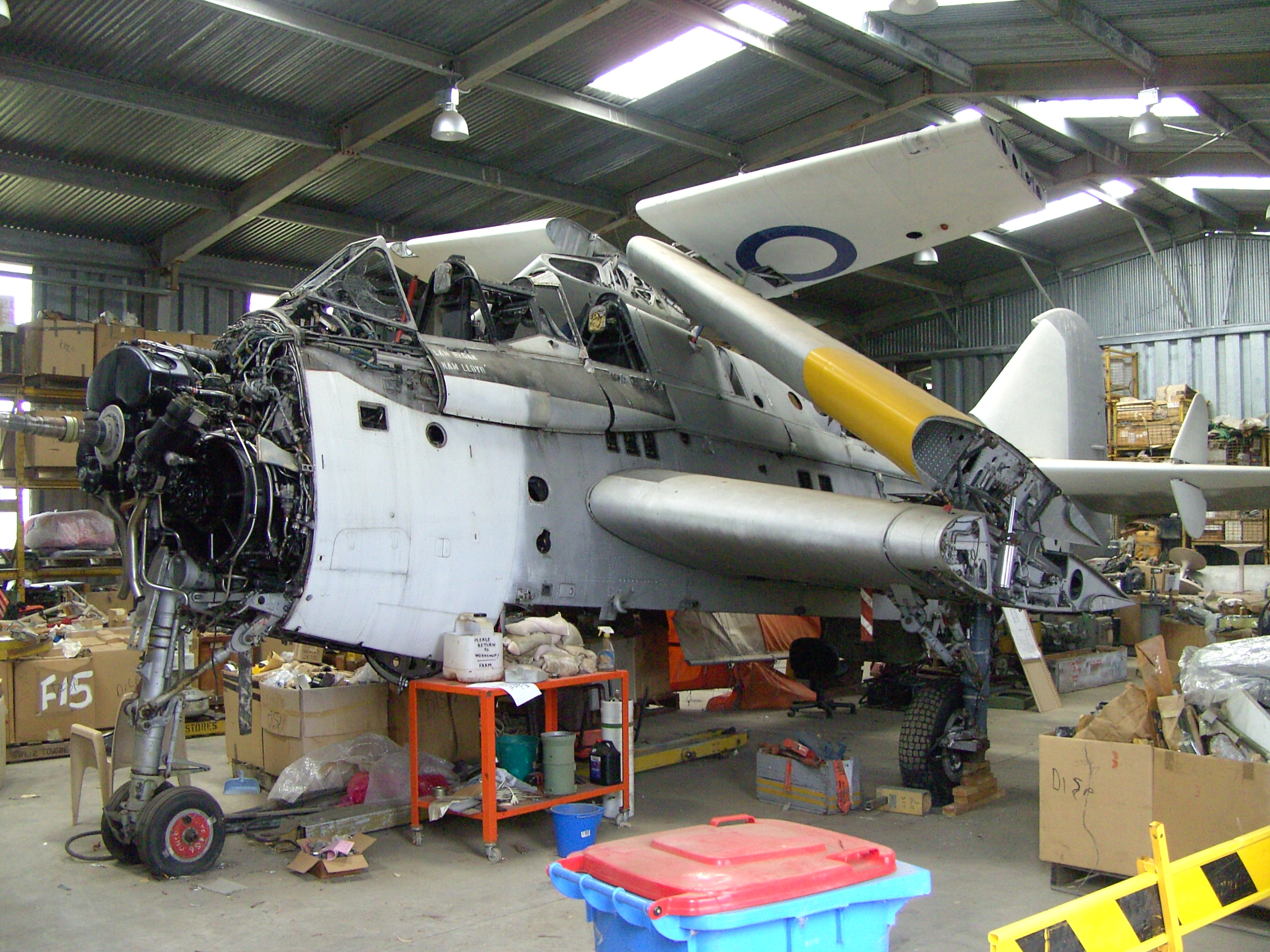
Double Mamba - side view in-situ.

Data from Flight

==== General characteristics ====
- Type: Turboprop engine
- Length: 102.25 in (2,597 mm)
- Diameter: 52.8 in (1,341 mm)
- Dry weight: 2,170 lb (984 kg)

==== Components ====
- Compressor: 10 stage axial (×2)
- Combustors: Six combustion chambers (×2)

==== Performance ====
- Maximum power output: 2,960 eshp (2,207 kW)
- Overall pressure ratio: 5.35:1
- Air mass flow: 18.5 lb/sec (8.4 kg/s) per single Mamba unit
- Specific fuel consumption: 1.71 lb/(lbf·h)
- Power-to-weight ratio: 1.36 eshp/lb

== See also ==
Related development

- Armstrong Siddeley Mamba

Comparable engines

- Allison T40

Related lists

- List of aircraft engines
