= B88 =

B88 may refer to:

- Sicilian Defence, Scheveningen Variation, according to the list of chess openings
- Bundesstraße 88, a German road
- Kleinkirchheimer Straße, an Austrian road

B-88 may refer to:

- B-88 (Michigan county highway)
- Blackburn B-88, a prototype carrier-borne Anti-submarine warfare aircraft
