= Coax-P =

Aircraft propeller

The Coax-P is a contra-rotating propeller developed by NeuraJet of Senftenbach, Austria and Sun Flightcraft of Innsbruck, Austria for the Rotax 503 and Rotax 582 aircraft engines for use on ultralight aircraft.

== Design and development ==
The Coax-P was designed by Hans Neudorfer of NeuraJet and Herbert Hofbauer of Sun Flightcraft. The propeller increases thrust by 15-20% over single propellers and reduces noise levels, especially low frequency noise, while eliminating torque effects.

The propeller system was designed for ultralight trikes and powered parachutes. The latter are especially sensitive to torque effects and the propeller design addresses that issue.

The design has two propellers, each with two composite, ground adjustable blades and uses a 3.7:1 gear box type reduction drive. The two propellers are powered by two meshing and counter-rotating shafts, powered by helical gear wheels running in an oil bath.

The gap between and the pitch of the two propellers must be exactly right. Neudorfer explains, "when the setting is not exactly right, the air stream from the second propeller meets the retrograde air stream from the first propeller at the wrong angle and all this does is to produce more noise and more turbulence. The correct agreement of the setting angle and the hub gaps for the different propeller hub forms can only be established by doing the finest of setting work. Should the propeller be out of place by only two millimeters the effectiveness declines and the noise level increases dramatically."

== Applications ==
- Sun Flightcraft Air-Chopper

== Specifications (Coax-P) ==
Source: Sunflight

- Propeller blades: composite, ground adjustable
- Number of blades: four (two on each propeller)
- Reduction drive: 3.7:1 gear box
- Weight: 17 kg (37 lb)

== See also ==
- List of aircraft propeller manufacturers
