= Blackburn B-54 =

British anti-submarine warfare aircraft prototypes

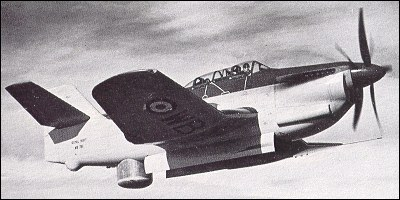
- A Blackburn B-54

General information
- Type: Anti-submarine warfare aircraft
- National origin: United Kingdom
- Manufacturer: Blackburn Aircraft
- Primary user: Fleet Air Arm
- Number built: 3

History
- First flight: 20 September 1949

The Blackburn B-54 and B-88 were prototype carrier-borne anti-submarine warfare aircraft of the immediate post-Second World War era developed for the Royal Navy's Fleet Air Arm (FAA). They shared a conventional monoplane design with a mid-mounted inverted-gull wing and tricycle undercarriage. The pilot and observer sat in tandem under a long canopy atop the fuselage. The B-54 had a piston engine while the B-88 had a gas turbine driving large contra-rotating propellers. The radar scanner was mounted in a retractable radome in the rear fuselage, behind a long internal weapons bay. The program was cancelled in favour of the Fairey Gannet aircraft.

== History ==
The B-54, or Y.A.5, was designed to meet Specification "G.R.17/45" for an advanced carrier-borne anti-submarine aircraft by Blackburn Aircraft. Rivals Fairey designed their Fairey 17 to the same specification, which would eventually evolve into the winning design, the Fairey Gannet. The original Y.A.5 was designed to take the new Napier Coupled Naiad turboprop engine, consisting of two single Naiads driving contra-rotating propellers through a common gearbox. This engine was ultimately cancelled, so the Y.A.5 flew as the Y.A.7 with a Rolls-Royce Griffon 56 piston engine driving contra-rotating propellers. This aircraft made its maiden flight on 20 September 1949 ahead of the competing Fairey design. In 1950, the Admiralty added the requirement for a radar and radar operator to the specification. The Y.A.7 was further refined into the Y.A.8, first flying on 3 May 1950, with aerodynamic refinements to improve handling, and the third crew position. The Y.A.8 design was used as the basis for the B-88 Y.B.1 which first flew on 19 July 1950. The B-88 had an Armstrong Siddeley Double Mamba engine similar in design to the original Naiad that was to be fitted to the Y.A.5. Development of this design was protracted and the FAA lost interest in favour of the promising Fairey Gannet, which had already flown with the Double Mamba and carried out landing trials, and which was to enter operational service fulfilling the original specification.

== Design ==
The B-54 / B-88 shared a common airframe. It was a large, single-propeller conventional monoplane with a mid-mounted, inverted-gull wing and a mid-mounted horizontal tailplane with considerable dihedral. Unlike the Fairey Gannet, it had a simple wing folding mechanism that split once at the angle of the gull-wing. The deep fuselage accommodated the engine(s), and large weapons bay and the crew of two were seated high up in tandem under a single canopy (the third crewman in the Gannet was specified after the cancellation of the Blackburn design). The undercarriage was a tricycle type and a radar scanner was carried in the rear fuselage in a retractable dome, much like in the Fairey Gannet.

== Engine ==
After the cancellation of the Napier Naiad programme, the prototype was fitted with the readily available Rolls-Royce Griffon 56 engine, delivering 2,000 hp (1,491 kW) to a 13 ft (4 m), six-blade (two three-bladed propellers) contra rotating propeller mechanism. In the B-88, an engine plant was based on the Armstrong Siddeley Mamba gas turbine, the Double Mamba - also known as the "Twin Mamba" - driving two four-blade contra-rotating propellers through a common gearbox. The ASMD.1 engine used on the B-88 was rated at 2,950 hp (2,200 kW).

== Aircraft ==
Blackburn B-54/YA.5
intended to take Napier Naiad engine, converted to YA.7 before completion.
Blackburn B-54/YA.7
YA.5 airframe with Rolls-Royce Griffon 56 engine, one prototype WB781 first flown 20 September 1949.
Blackburn B-54/YA.8
Three-seat version with a Griffon 56 engine (later changed to Griffon 57), one prototype WB788 first flown 3 May 1950.
Blackburn B-88 YB.1
YA.8 with Armstrong Siddeley Double-Mamba engine, one prototype WB797 first flown 19 July 1950.

== Specifications (B-88) ==
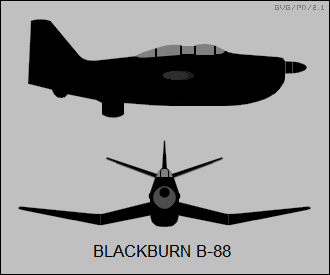
B-88 two-view

Data from Blackburn Aircraft since 1909

General characteristics

- Crew: 3
- Length: 42 ft 8 in (13.00 m)
- Wingspan: 44 ft 2 in (13.46 m)
- Height: 16 ft 9 in (5.11 m)
- Gross weight: 13,091 lb (5,938 kg)
- Powerplant: 1 × Armstrong Siddeley ASMD.1 Double Mamba coupled turboprop engine, 2,950 shp (2,200 kW)
- Propellers: 8-bladed contra-rotating constant speed, fully-feathering propeller

Performance

- Maximum speed: 320 mph (510 km/h, 280 kn)

Armament

- bombs or depth charges in internal weapons bay

== See also ==
Aircraft of comparable role, configuration, and era

- Breguet Alizé
- Fairey Gannet
- S-2 Tracker
- Short Seamew

Related lists

- List of maritime patrol aircraft

== Bibliography ==
- Buttler, Tony (2015). X-Planes of Europe. Vol. II: Military Prototype Aircraft from the Golden Age 1946–1974. Manchester, UK: Hikoki Publications. ISBN 978-1-90210-948-0.
- Jackson, A. J. (1968). Blackburn Aircraft since 1909. London: Putnam. ISBN 0-370-00053-6.
- Williams, Ray (1989). Fly Navy: Aircraft of the Fleet Air Arm since 1945. Shrewsbury, Shropshire: Airlife Publishing. ISBN 1-85310-057-9.
