= Contra-rotating marine propellers =

A Mark 46 Mod 5A torpedo is inspected aboard a destroyer in April 2005

Contra-rotating propellers have benefits when providing thrust in marine applications. Contra-rotating propellers are used on torpedoes due to the natural torque compensation and are also used in some motor boats. The cost of boring out the outer shafts and problems of mounting the inner shaft bearings are not worth pursuing in case of normal ships.

== Advantages and disadvantages ==
=== Advantages ===
- The propeller-induced heeling moment is compensated (negligible for larger ships).
- More power can be transmitted for a given propeller radius.
- The propeller efficiency is increased by recovering energy from the tangential (rotational) flow from the leading propeller. Tangential flow does not contribute to thrust, conversion of tangential to axial flow increases both thrust and overall system efficiency.

=== Disadvantages ===
- The mechanical installation of coaxial contra-rotating shafts is complicated and expensive and requires more maintenance.
- The hydrodynamic gains are partially reduced by mechanical losses in shafting.

== Applications ==
Torpedoes such as the Bliss-Leavitt torpedo have commonly used contra-rotating propellers to give the maximum possible speed within a limited diameter as well as counteracting the torque that would otherwise tend to cause the torpedo to rotate around its own longitudinal axis.

Recreational boating also found applications: in 1982 Volvo Penta introduced a contra-rotating boat propeller branded DuoProp. The patented device has been marketed since. After the Volvo Penta patents ran out, Mercury Marine has also produced a corresponding product, MerCruiser Bravo 3.

However, in commercial ships and in traditional machinery arrangement, contra-rotating propellers are rare, due to cost and complexity.

ABB provided an azimuth thruster for ShinNihonkai Ferries in form of the CRP Azipod, claiming efficiency gains from the propeller (about 10% increase) and a simpler hull design. Volvo Penta have launched the IPS (Inboard Performance System), an integrated diesel, transmission and pulling contra-rotating propellers for motor yachts.

At lower power levels, contra-rotating mechanical azimuth thrusters are one possibility, convenient for CRP due to their inherent bevel gear construction. Rolls-Royce and Steerprop have offered CRP versions of their products.
