= Australian National Aviation Museum =

Aviation museum near Melbourne, Australia

Moorabbin Air Museum
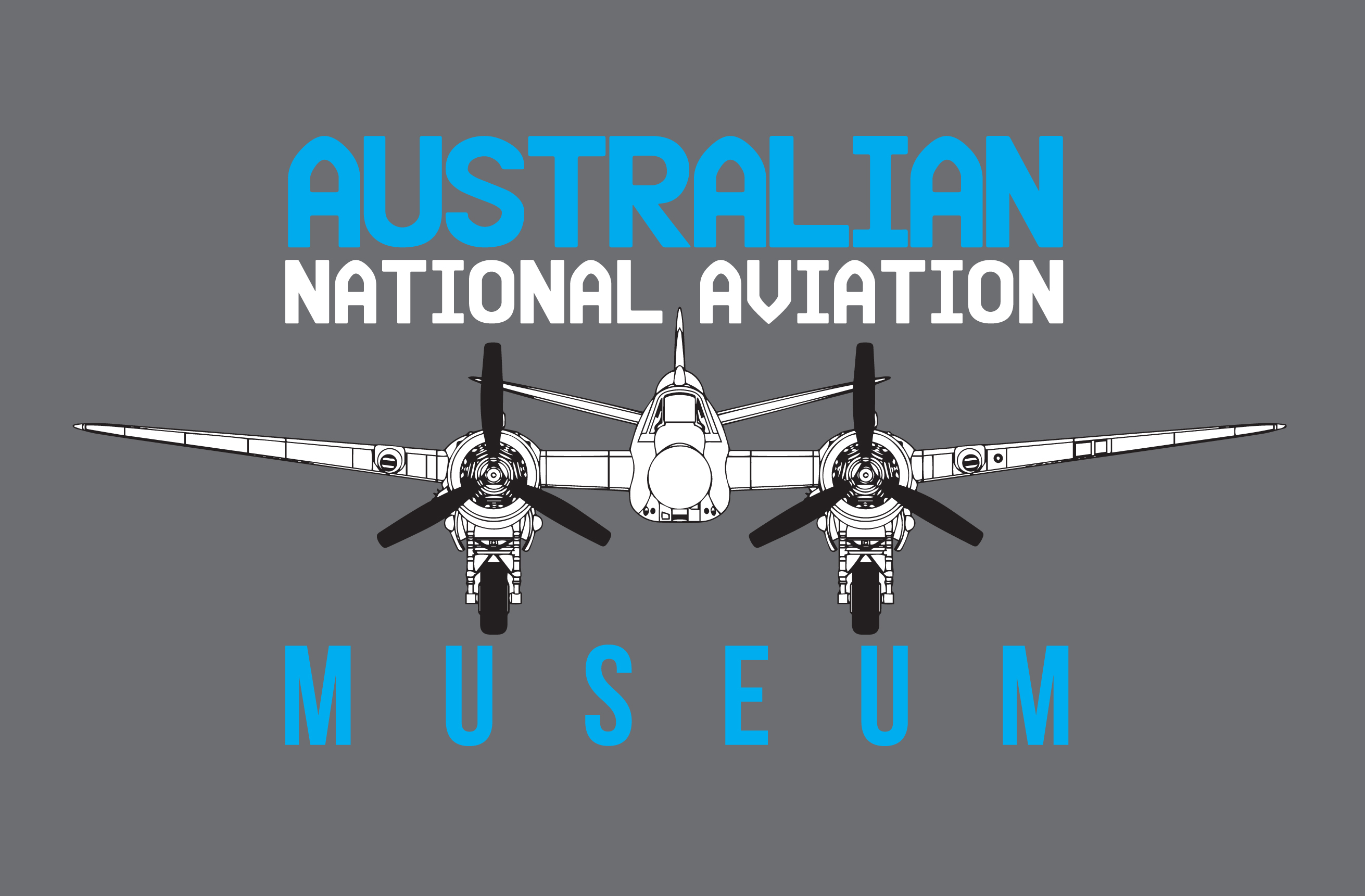

- Location within Victoria
- Established: 1962
- Location: Melbourne, Victoria, Australia
- Coordinates: 37.9767°S 145.091°E
- Type: Aerospace
- Website: www.aarg.com.au

The Moorabbin Air Museum is an aviation museum at Moorabbin Airport in Melbourne, Victoria, Australia. It was founded in 1962 as the Australian Aircraft Restoration Group, in an attempt to maintain a World War II-era Bristol Beaufighter aircraft. It has since become a museum, with a large aircraft collection. It was known as the Australian National Aviation Museum up until October 2021. As of 2021 it held nearly 60 aircraft and 25 engines.

== History ==
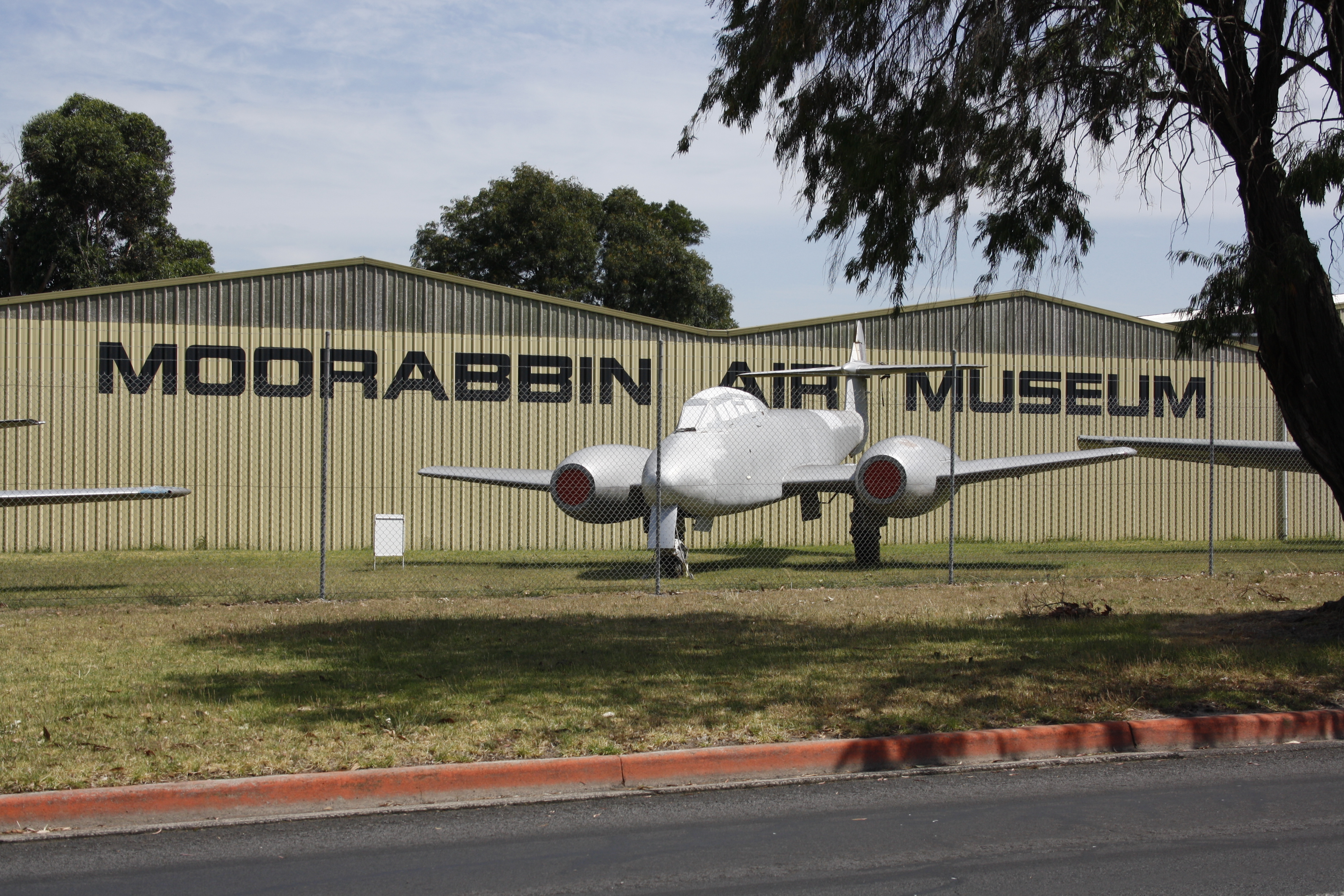
RAAF Gloster Meteor

The Australian Aircraft Restoration Group was first formed in 1962 as a volunteer group by aviation enthusiasts including members of the Aviation Historical Society of Australia.

The first home for the collection was on a farm in Wandin North then the Pine Hill Service Station, on the Warburton road, outside of Lillydale. The museum aircraft were stored there with the Wackett trainer, donated by the Lucas family, displayed prominently. In 1965 land was allocated for a museum at Moorabbin Airport.

The collection in the early days was made up of a combination of privately owned aircraft and those the Museum acquired in their own right .

Amongst the first acquisitions was DAP Mark 21 Bristol Beaufighter A8-328 ex Royal Australian Air Force (RAAF) that had been used as playground equipment at The Lord Mayor's Children's Camp at Portsea and was at risk of being scrapped.

Following donation of the Beaufighter in April 1962, a CAC Wackett was donated by the Lucas family, followed by the oldest complete aircraft in the collection, a De Haviland DH.60G Gypsy Moth.

1963 was a busy year for the group. In January an Avro Anson was purchased from Flinders Island Airlines, ( VH-FIA) and in May a Gloster Meteor was acquired from the Department of Supply. Trans Australia Airlines (TAA) donated a de Havilland Tiger Moth in mid-1963, and the year was rounded out by recovering a CAC Wirraway from the dump at East Sale RAAF base .

Early in 1964, most of the collection was moved to a service station north of Lilydale, where the Wacket was put on display where it remained until moved to Moorabbin. Later in the year many of the aircraft were taken to a market garden adjacent to Moorabbin Airport. In October 1964, a Percival Proctor was donated, and by this stage the Department of Civil Aviation had agreed to lease the group land at Moorabbin Airport, with a fence erected on 20 May 1965.

In 1966, the AARG returned to the farming district near Colac and collected a Curtiss Kittyhawk fuselage, while February 1967 saw the most spectacular arrival when a former Royal Australian Navy (RAN) Fairey Firefly was flown from Bankstown in New South Wales to Moorabbin.

For the next 20 years the Museum grew as more and more aircraft came into the collection and the theme of the Museum was quickly established. An aircraft or artefact acquired by the Museum had to be relevant to Australian aviation history. Without realising it the Museum was establishing what would be labelled by museum professionals years later as a collection policy. This theme is what held the Museum collection together and provided a sense of purpose to the collection. Other aviation museums would form in Australia but none would acquire the vast range of aircraft types, all of which related directly to Australian history. The collection ranges from gliders and homebuilts to World War II combat aircraft, jet fighters, crop dusters and four engine airliners.

== 1980s and Beyond ==
By the early 1980s the aircraft collection had grown to 30 machines but another lesson had been learned. Collecting aircraft, restoring them and displaying them was not enough. At this time the Museum was still an open-air display and the effects of the weather were beginning to play havoc with the aircraft.

During the 1970s and 1980s there had been various proposals put forward by government and private groups to fund a National Aviation Museum in Victoria. The Moorabbin Air Museum was involved in many of these deliberations, but by the late 1980s it had become apparent that none of these schemes would reach fruition. The Museum directors realised that the only way to ensure the long-term survival of the aircraft was to take action themselves, and in 1988 all surplus assets of the museum were sold in order to provide funds to erect an 8,000-square-foot hangar on the Museum site. In April 1989 that hangar was completed and three years later it was extended to 12,000 square feet. In the intervening years a library, workshop and store were also erected together with an entry building and shop.

Over the years the Moorabbin Air Museum has been recognised by a number of awards, including a Certificate of Merit in the 1985 Museum of the Year Awards. Apart from the preservation of aircraft, the Museum has also had a number of young members who have gone on to careers in aviation or museology.

Between 1980 and 2000 the aircraft collection increased by an average of one airframe per year. The collection now totals 52 machines, and that makes the Museum the largest aircraft owner on Moorabbin Airport. It is an aeronautical collection larger than half the world's airlines and a third of the world's air forces, but only one third of it is displayed under cover. The rest is in storage, on loan, under restoration or on display in the open air.

In September 2021, the Museum was granted a lease on land opposite the current site, increasing total size by around 4000sqm. A new facility will be built there as part of Stage One of the Community Heritage Precinct, and will finally see all aircraft undercover and protected for the first time in the Museum's history.

== Aircraft in collection ==
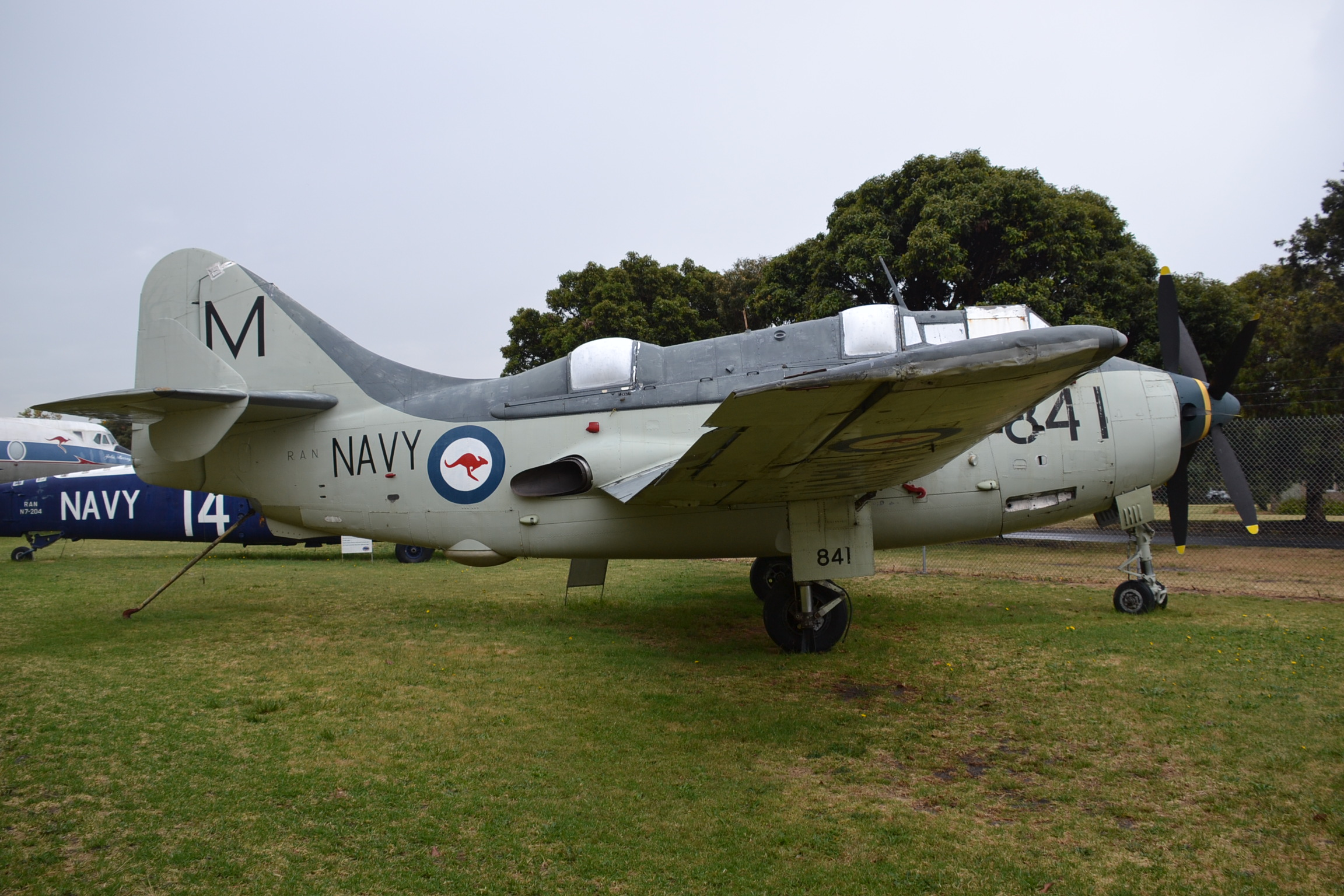
RAN Fairey Gannet

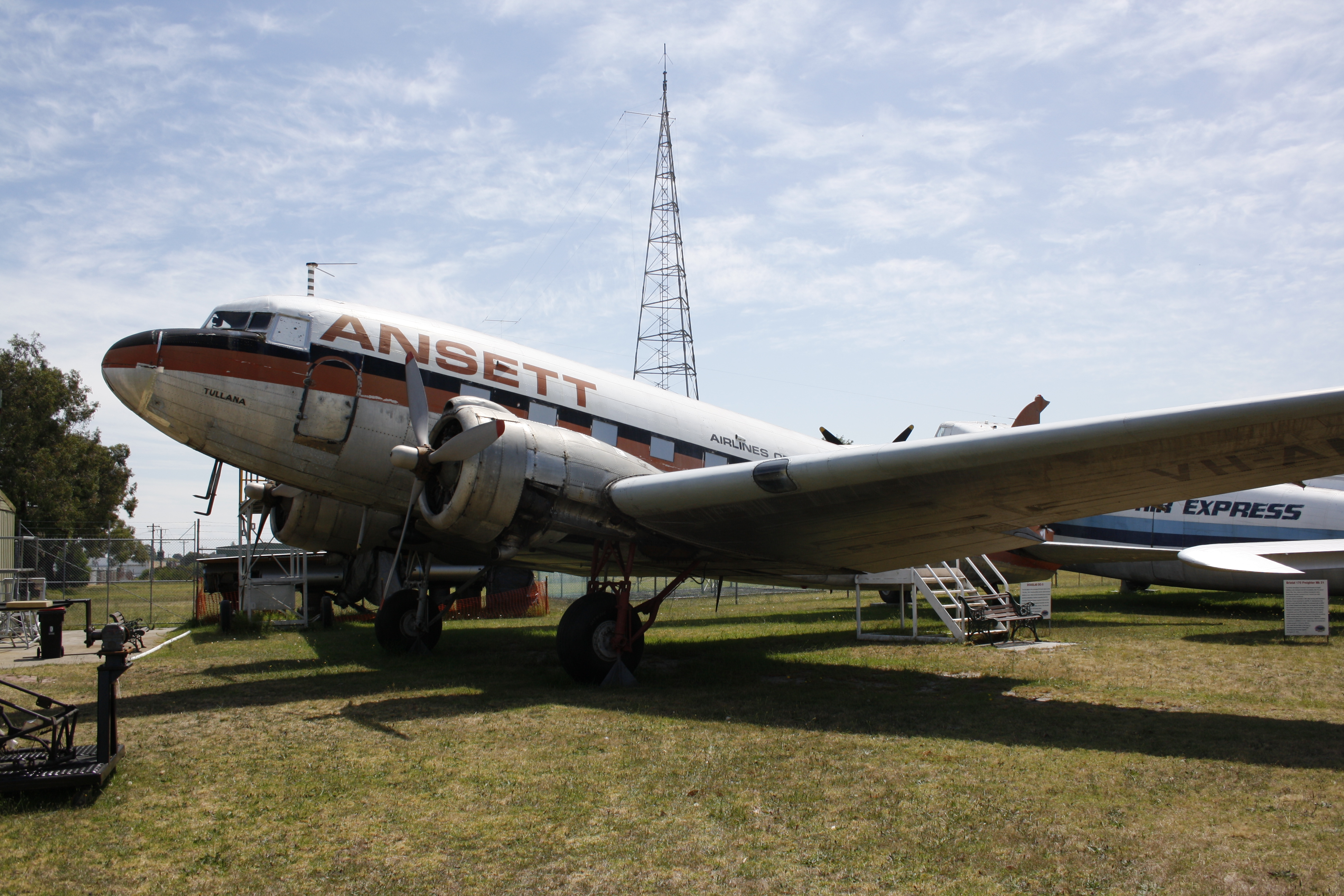
Ansett Douglas DC-3

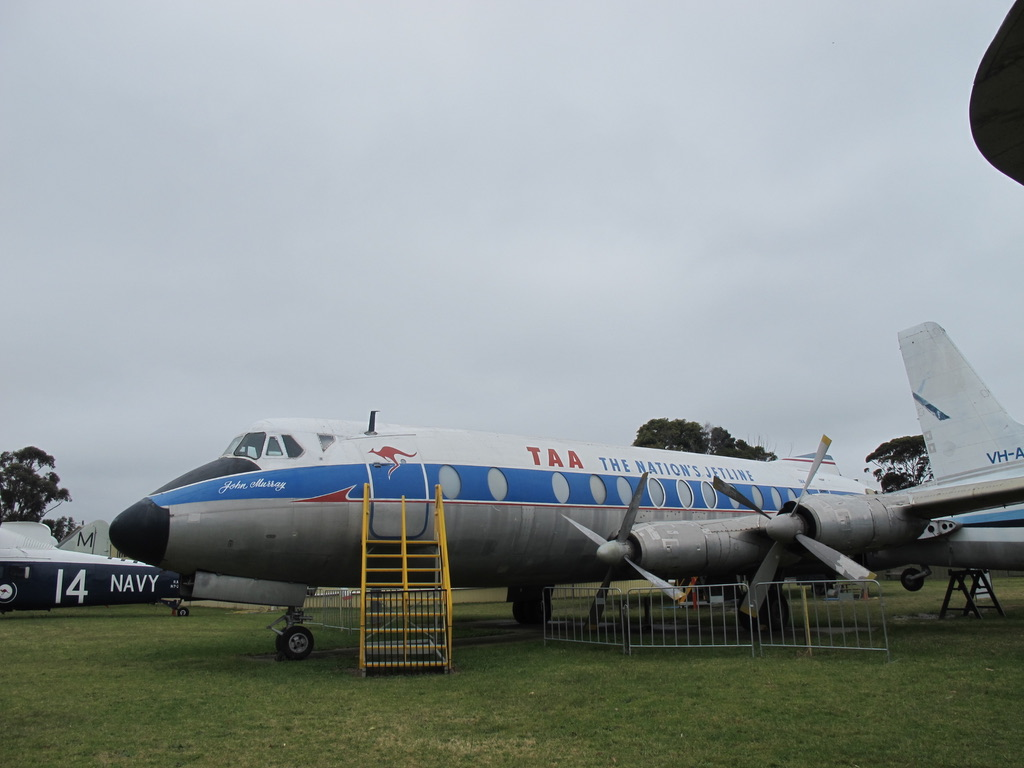
TAA Vickers Viscount

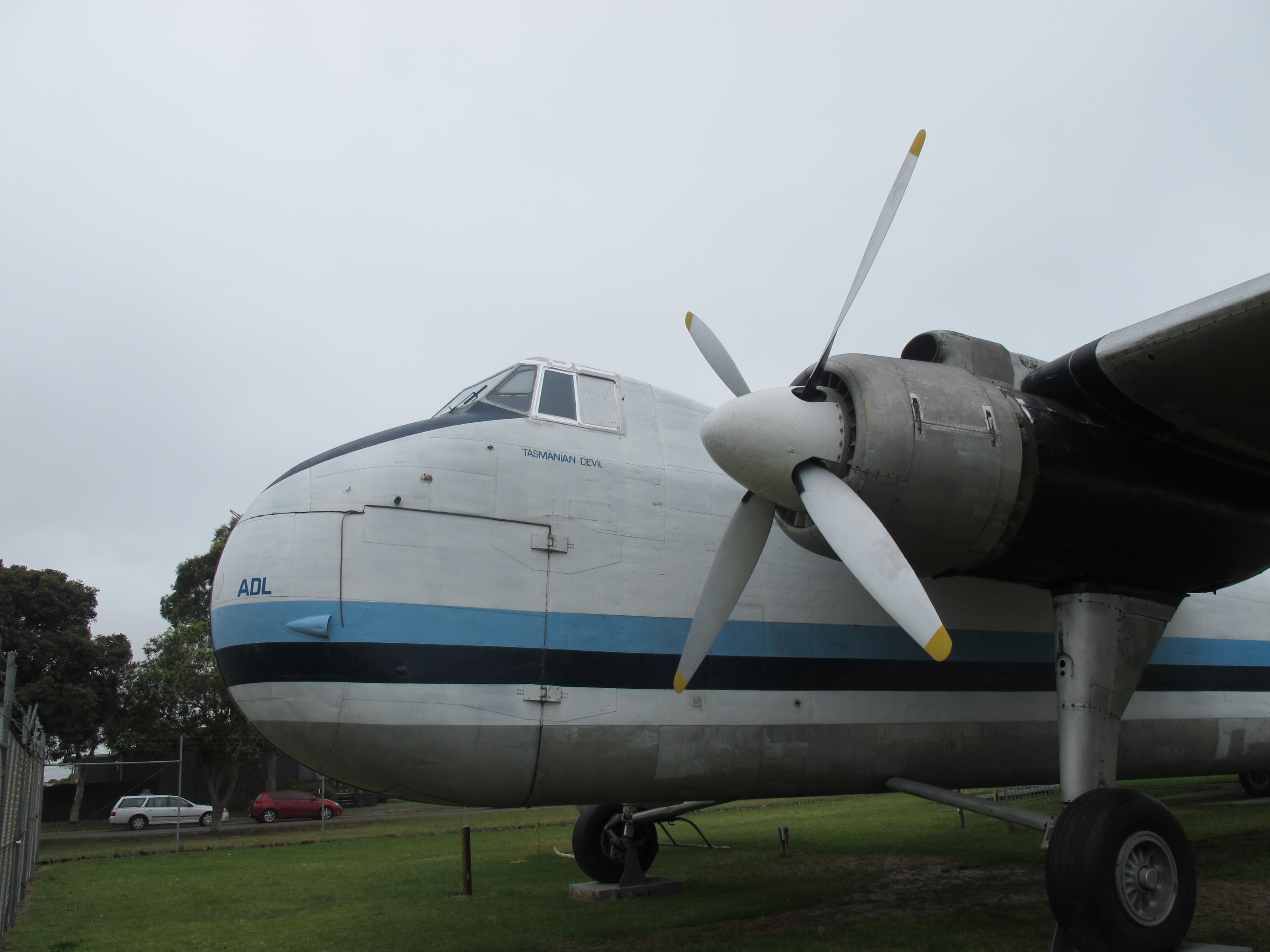
Air Express Bristol Freighter

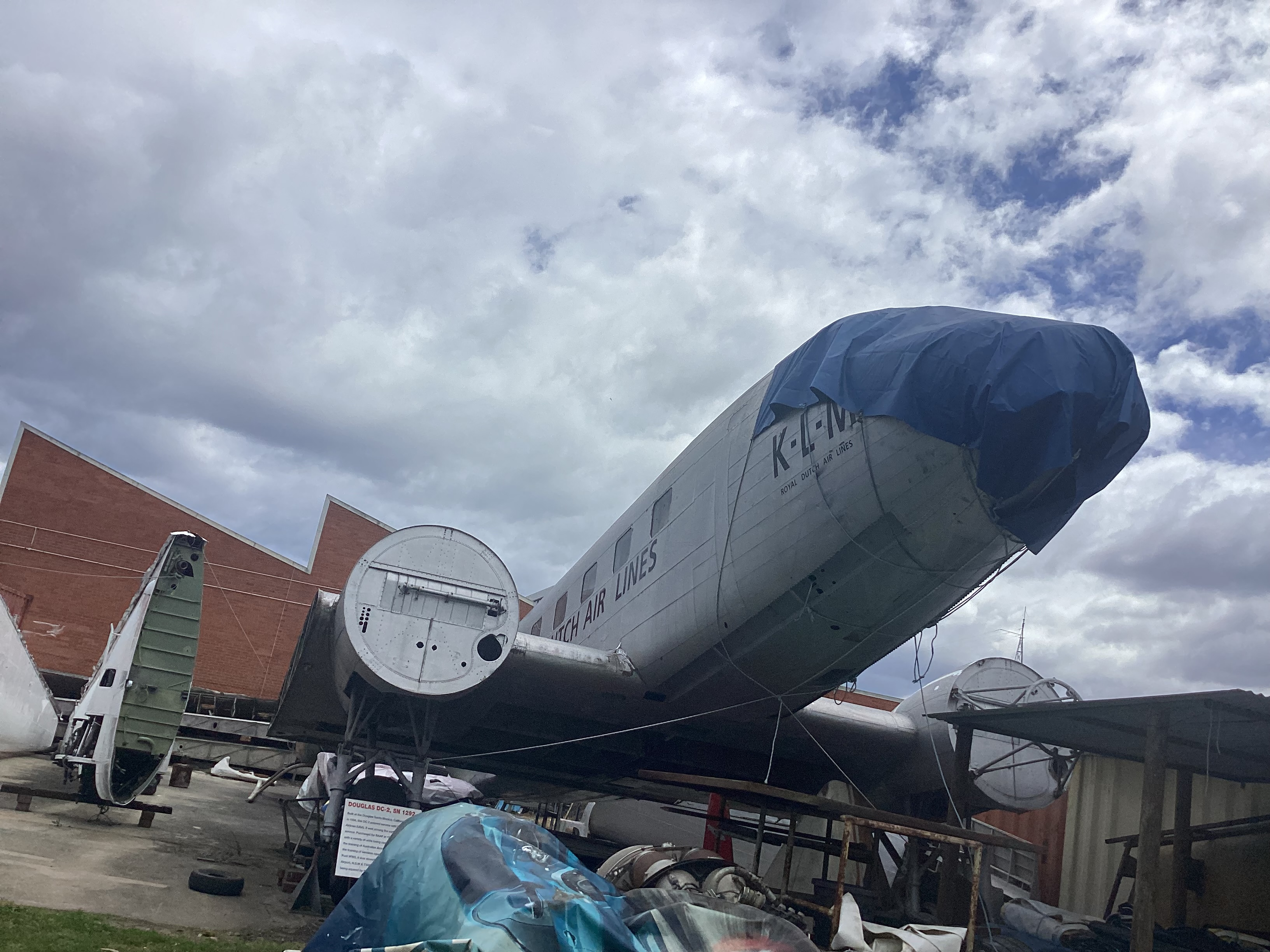
The KLM DC-2 in storage.

Acquired	Operator/s	Aircraft	Number
2018	RAAF	CA-27 Avon Sabre	A94-910
1994	RAAF	CAC CA-12 Boomerang	A46-25
	RAAF	CAC CA-31 Operational Trainer (mock-up)	
		CAC CA-28 Ceres	VH-WOT
1968	RAAF	CAC CA-6 Wackett	A3-22
1982	RAAF	CAC CA-25 Winjeel	A85-418
	RAAF	CAC CA-1 Wirraway	A20-10
	RAF	Royal Aircraft Factory B.E.2a (wings only)	
	RAAF	DAP Bristol Beaufort MK V	A9-13
	RAAF	GAF Jindivik	A92-492
	RAF	Avro Lincoln	RF342
1993	RAAF	Dassault Mirage IIIO	A3-45
	RAAF	General Dynamics F-111 (cockpit)	A8-131
	RAAF	Bristol Type 171 Sycamore	A91-1
	RAAF	Consolidated PBY Catalina	A24-88
1966	RAAF	Curtiss P-40E Kittyhawk (under restoration)	A29-53
1985	RAAF/TAA	de Havilland Tiger Moth	A17-377
	RAN	de Havilland Sea Venom	N4-901
1972	RAN	Fairey Firefly	WD827
	RAN	Fairey Gannet A.S.4	XG789
1963	RAAF	Gloster Meteor T7	A77-707
1982		Miles M-38 Messenger 2A (Civilian airframe painted in RAF Invasion stripes	VH-AVQ
2004	Pakistan Air Force/Air Express	Bristol Type 170 Freighter	VH-ADL
2005	Eastern Air Lines/RAAF	Douglas DC-2	NC13782 / A30-9 / VH-CRK
1972	USAAF/RAAF/ANA/Ansett Australia	Douglas DC-3	VH-ANH (VHCDJ)
1971	Cubana de Aviación/Trans Australia Airlines	Vickers Viscount V.816	VH-TVR
1992		Auster J-1B Aiglet	VH-ACY
1967		British Aircraft Swallow II	VH-UUM
1982		Cessna 310	VH-AER
	Airlines of Tasmania	de Havilland Heron	VH-CLX
1965		de Havilland Gypsy Moth	VH-UKV
1968		Desoutter Mk.II	VH-UPR
		Duigan pusher biplane(Replica)	VH-DGN
		Percival Proctor	VH-AUC
2015	US Air	Boeing 737 (forward fuselage)	RP-C8006
1989	Aero Club of South Australia	Victa Airtourer 100	VH-BWI
2005	KLM	Douglas DC-2 (in storage)	Unknown Registration
2016	RAAF	English Electric Canberra	A84-226
2016		Pazmany PL-4	VH-XAP
2016	Royal Australian Air Force	GAF Nomad	A18-316
2021	Victoria Police	Aerospatiale Dauphin II	VH-PVF

== See also ==
- List of aerospace museums
