= Fairey Gannet =

Naval aircraft family (1953–1978)

Gannet
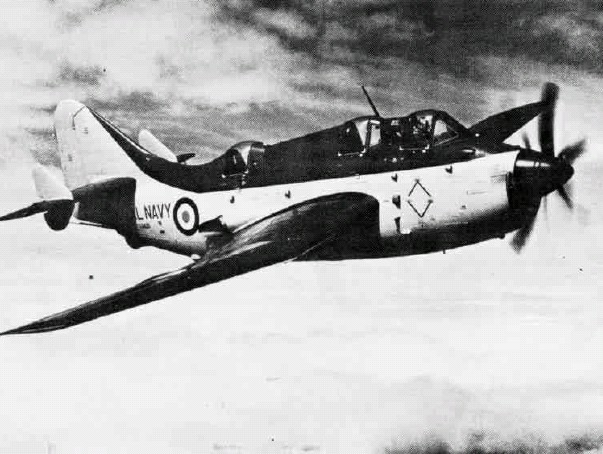
- A Royal Navy Fairey Gannet AS.4

General information
- Type: Anti-submarine warfare aircraft
- National origin: United Kingdom
- Manufacturer: Fairey Aviation Company
- Primary users: Royal Navy: Royal Australian Navy; German Navy; Indonesian Navy
- Number built: 303 (anti-submarine); 44 (airborne early warning)

History
- Manufactured: 1953–1959
- Introduction date: 1953
- First flight: 19 September 1949
- Retired: 15 December 1978
- Variant: Fairey Gannet AEW.3

The Fairey Gannet is a carrier-borne aircraft that was designed and produced by the British aircraft manufacturer the Fairey Aviation Company. It was developed for the Royal Navy, being the first fixed-wing aircraft to combine both the search and strike portions of anti-submarine warfare (ASW) operations to be operated by the Fleet Air Arm (FAA).

The Gannet was originally developed to meet a Second World War era requirement for a dual-role ASW and strike to equip the FAA. It was a mid-wing monoplane with a tricycle undercarriage and a crew of three, with a double turboprop engine driving two counter-rotating propellers. On 19 September 1949, the prototype Gannet performed its maiden flight. Four years later, it was brought into regular service with the FAA. The service would use the type from the majority of its aircraft carriers throughout the Cold War. Various export customers were also secured for the Gannet, including the Royal Australian Navy, the German Navy, and the Indonesian Navy, most of these operating the aircraft exclusively from land bases.

During the 1960s, the Royal Navy transitioned to using helicopters, such as the Westland Whirlwind HAS.7, for ASW operations. Accordingly, several Gannets were adapted to perform alternative operations, such as an airborne electronic countermeasures platform and carrier onboard delivery aircraft. Perhaps the most extensive variant of the type was the Gannet AEW.3, which was developed as a carrier-based airborne early warning platform and was operated exclusively by the FAA. The service disposed of its Gannets on 15 December 1978, roughly aligning with the withdrawal of the last of the Royal Navy's large fleet carriers.

== Development ==
=== Background ===
According to the aviation historian H. A. Taylor, the origins of what would become the Gannet can be traced back to 1935, when the Fairey Aviation Company started development of the unsuccessful Fairey Prince that used an unusual twin-engine arrangement. Formal design work on the Gannet commenced in response to the issuing of requirement GR.17/45 in 1945, under which the Admiralty sought a new twin-seat aircraft capable of performing both anti-submarine warfare (ASW) and strike missions. Two rival aircraft manufacturers, Fairey and Blackburn Aircraft, opted to produce responses. Fairey's submission was known as the Type Q or Fairey 17 (these designations being sources from the naming of the requirement), while Blackburn's was the Blackburn B-54 / B-88.

For 18 months, Fairey investigated the use of a single Rolls-Royce Tweed turboprop engine to power their proposed aircraft, however, this option was discontinued to concentrate on other efforts. Instead, Fairey approached the engine manufacturer Armstrong Siddeley to develop a new engine based on the existing Armstrong Siddeley Mamba turboprop: the Double Mamba (otherwise known as the "Twin Mamba"). This engine basically comprised a pair of Mamba engines that were mounted side-by-side and sharing a common gearbox. The proposal was enthusiastically accepted and formal design work on the engine started in December 1945.

The acceptance of this proposal enabled Fairey to develop a rather atypical propulsion arrangement for their proposed aircraft, which was normally only possible for a single engined aircraft. Via the use of a pair of coaxial contra-rotating propellers fitted on the nose of the aircraft, various advantages were presented over conventional twin-engine counterparts; one engine could be shut down and its propellers feathered without producing asymmetry and therefore control difficulties. Shutting down one of the two engines in flight would reduce fuel consumption and extend the aircraft's range.

On 12 August 1946, Fairey was awarded an initial contract to produce two prototypes; Blackburn also received a competing contract to build its own prototypes. One reason for the ordering of multiple prototypes was so that alternative engines, such as the Napier Nomad, could be test flown, although some of these alternatives would never actually be fitted. Another reason was the relatively radical engine arrangement and the high proportion of original design features incorporated into the aircraft.

=== Into flight ===
On 19 September 1949, the prototype performed its maiden flight from Aldermaston outside Reading, flown by R. G. Slate; this milestone occurred ten months ahead of Blackburn's competing prototype. While some elements of the prototype proved relatively trouble-free, such as the Double Mamba engine, several early test flights had been troubled by flight control difficulties. These issues, such as sharp trim changes, did not delay the next stage of testing, which commenced in November of that year at Fairey's White Waltham facility. On 25 November 1949, the prototype crash-landed during an unstable landing, leading to three months of repairs.

On 1 March 1950, flight testing resumed with the repaired prototype. By this point, several of the handling issues had been appropriately remedied along with several other faults, yet difficulties with holding the nose wheel up during landings remained. Two months later, sufficient progress had been made to proceed with a formal assessment by naval test pilots at RAF Boscombe Down as well as to begun preliminary carrier trials. On 19 June 1950, the prototype conducted the first deck landing by a turboprop aircraft on HMS Illustrious, piloted by Lieutenant Commander G. Callingham.

On 6 July 1950, the second prototype took to the skies, joining the flight test shortly thereafter. As a result of changes to the operational requirements, this aircraft featured numerous changes from the first prototype, such as a third canopy for an additional crew member and an extended bomb bay. To accommodate the latter, the radome had to be repositioned rearwards; the first prototype was modified to reflect these changes for the aerodynamic trials.

In May 1952, the first prototype returned to Boscombe Down to conduct deck landing assessments and trials, having been configured to represent a production-standard aircraft by this point. Changes included the repositioning of the main landing legs rearwards by 12 inches. Following a full series of handling trials, further carrier trials were performed aboard HMS Eagle. On 13 March 1951, Fairey received an initial order for 100 Gannet AS.1s from the British Government; this had been placed as a 'super-priority' on account of the Korean War. In 1953, quantity production of the type commenced.

On 9 June 1953, the first production Gannet performed its initial flight from RAF Northolt and was put to work in the latter stages of the flight test programme. One serious flaw encountered during the later stage of trials was instances of compressor stalls; the type was grounded for two months while the propeller control system was modified accordingly. One early production aircraft appeared at the 1953 Society of British Aerospace Companies (SBAC) display at Farnborough. On 5 April 1954, four Gannets were formally handed over to the FAA at RNAS Ford.

=== Further development ===
The development of several variants of the Gannet started relatively early. On 16 August 1954, the first Gannet T.2, a dedicated trainer variant made its initial flight; it was furnished with dual controls in the forward cockpits, with a retractable periscope for the second cockpit, while the radar apparatus and scanner equipment were deleted. Production of the Gannet was shared between Fairey's factories at Hayes, Middlesex and Heaton Chapel, Stockport / Manchester (Ringway) Airport. During 1954, production commenced at Heaton Chapel, the first aircraft from this production line flew on 5 October of that year. That same month, tropical trials were conducted in Khartoum.

During the late 1950s, an improved ASW model, the Gannet AS.4, and its T.5 trainer equivalent were developed. The improvements included the fitting of an up-rated Double Mamba engine. Several were refurbished with new electronics and radar; these were re-designated Gannet AS.6.

During 1958, the Gannet was selected to replace the Douglas Skyraider in the airborne early warning and control (AEW) role. In order to accommodate the systems required for this new mission, the Gannet underwent a significant redesign that saw a new version of the Double Mamba installed, a new radome mounted under the aircraft, the tailfin increased in area, the undercarriage lengthened and the weapons bay removed. A total of 44 aircraft (plus a single prototype) of the AEW.3 version were produced.

== Design ==
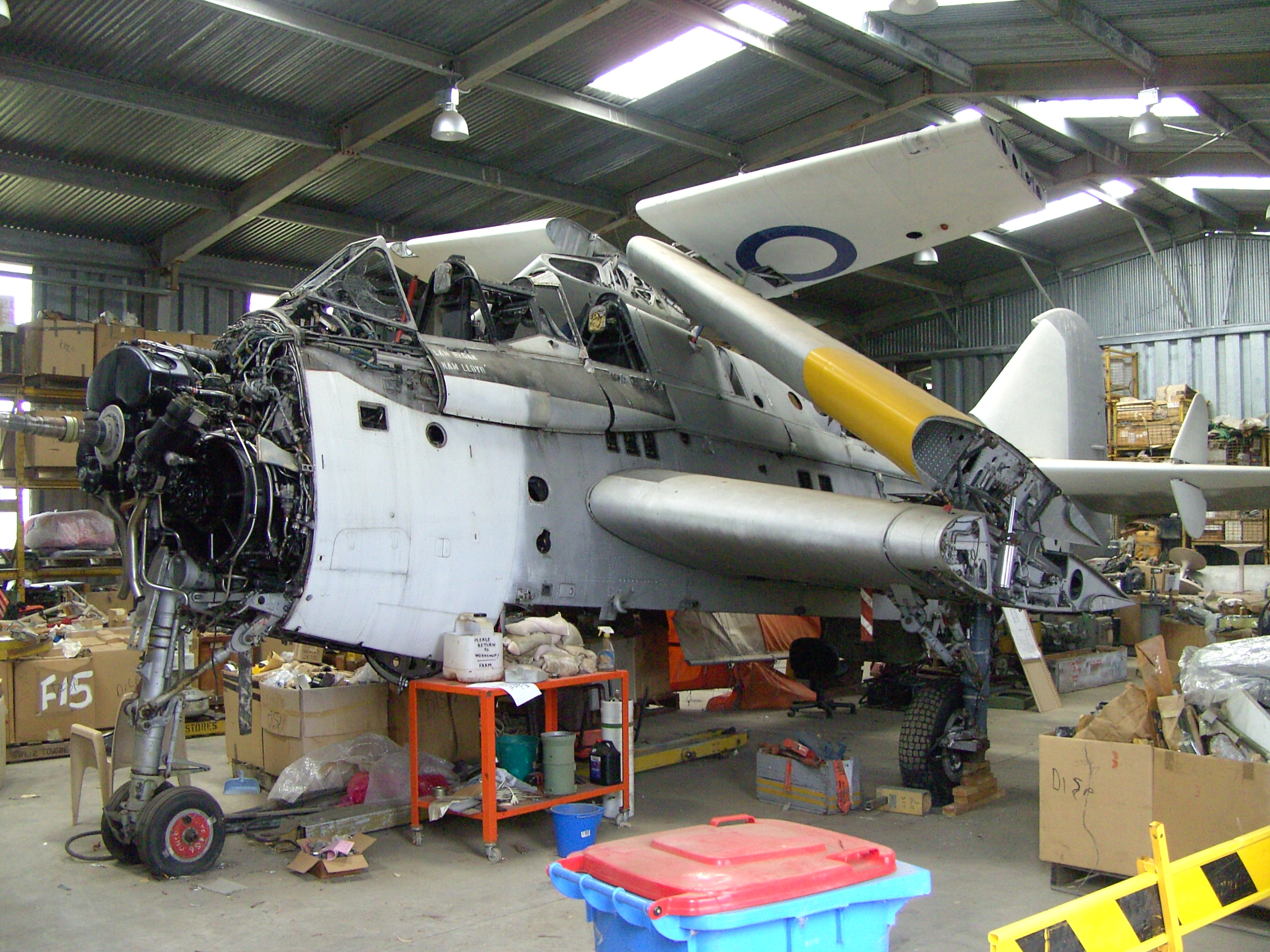
The Gannet's distinctive double folding wing. This specimen is shown in storage at the Australian Fleet Air Arm Museum.

The Fairey Gannet is a carrier-borne turboprop-powered aircraft. It was typically operated by a crew of three, a pilot and two aerial observers. The pilot was seated directly above the aircraft's Double Mamba engine and behind the gearbox and contra-rotating propellers in a position that conferred a favourable view over the nose for carrier operations. The first observer was seated underneath a separate canopy that was directly aft of the pilot's position. On the production aircraft, a second observer was also present in their own cockpit that was located over the wing trailing edge. This addition disturbed the airflow over the horizontal stabiliser, necessitating the addition of small finlets on either side.

The wing of the Gannet folded in two places, forming a distinctive Z-shape on each side, to minimise its space requirements while being stowed onboard aircraft carriers. The first fold was upwards, at about a third of the wing span where the inboard anhedral (down-sweep) changed to the outboard dihedral (up-sweep) of the wing (described as an inverted gull wing). The second wing fold was downward, at about two-thirds of the wing span. The length of the nosewheel shock absorber caused the Gannet to have a distinctive nose-high attitude, which was a common characteristic of carrier aircraft of the era.

The Gannet had a sizable internal bomb bay within the fuselage; it was the first British aircraft in FAA service to be capable of storing all its munitions (other than rockets) within an internal bomb bay. Such munitions could include depth charges, sonobuoys, homing torpedoes, bombs, markers, and mines. Hard points beneath the outer wings could carry up to 16 Mk.8 or 24 Mk.5 rocket projectiles; other equipment included 100 gallon external fuel tanks. The primary search apparatus was the air-to-surface-vessel (ASV) radar, which made use of a retractable radome positioned underneath the rear fuselage just to the aft of the bomb bay.

The Armstrong Siddeley Double Mamba engine consisted of two Mamba engines that were mounted in a side-by-side arrangement and coupled through a common gearbox to coaxial contra-rotating propellers. Each engine drove its own propeller, and power was transmitted by a torsion shaft which was engaged through a series of sun, planet, epicyclic and spur gears to give a suitable reduction ratio and correct propeller-shaft rotation. The ASMD.1 engine (2,950 hp; 2,200 kW) was used in the Gannet AS.1; ASMD.3 (3,145 hp; 2,345 kW) in the AS.4; and ASMD.4 (3,875 hp; 2,890 kW) in the AEW.3 variant. The Double Mamba engine could be run with one Mamba stopped and its propeller feathered, to conserve fuel and extend endurance when cruising; stopping one engine on a conventional twin-engined plane would normally create thrust asymmetry, whereas the centreline-mounted propeller arrangement avoided this. The Mamba exhausts were situated on each side of the fuselage, at the root of the wing trailing edge. The gas-turbine engine could run on kerosene, "wide-cut" turbine fuel or diesel fuel, allowing the Admiralty to eliminate the dangerous high-octane petroleum spirit required to operate piston-engined aircraft from carriers.

In FAA service, the Gannet generally wore the standard camouflage scheme of a Sky (duck-egg blue) underside and fuselage sides, with Extra Dark Sea Grey upper surfaces, the fuselage demarcation line running from the nose behind the propeller spinner in a straight line to then curve and join the line of the fin. Code numbers were typically painted on the side of the fuselage ahead of the wing; roundel and serial markings were behind the wing. The T.2 and T.5 trainers were finished in silver overall, with a yellow "Trainer band" on rear fuselage and wings.

== Operational history ==
During April 1954, deliveries of the Gannet AS.1 formally commenced. On 17 January 1955, the 826 NAS became the RN's first operational Gannet squadron, which promptly embarked on the modernised aircraft carrier HMS Eagle. During its initial at-sea deployment in the Mediterranean, no serious issues were encountered with the Gannet aside from the standard teething issues. Later that same year, the Royal Australian Navy (RAN) stood up their first two Gannet squadrons.

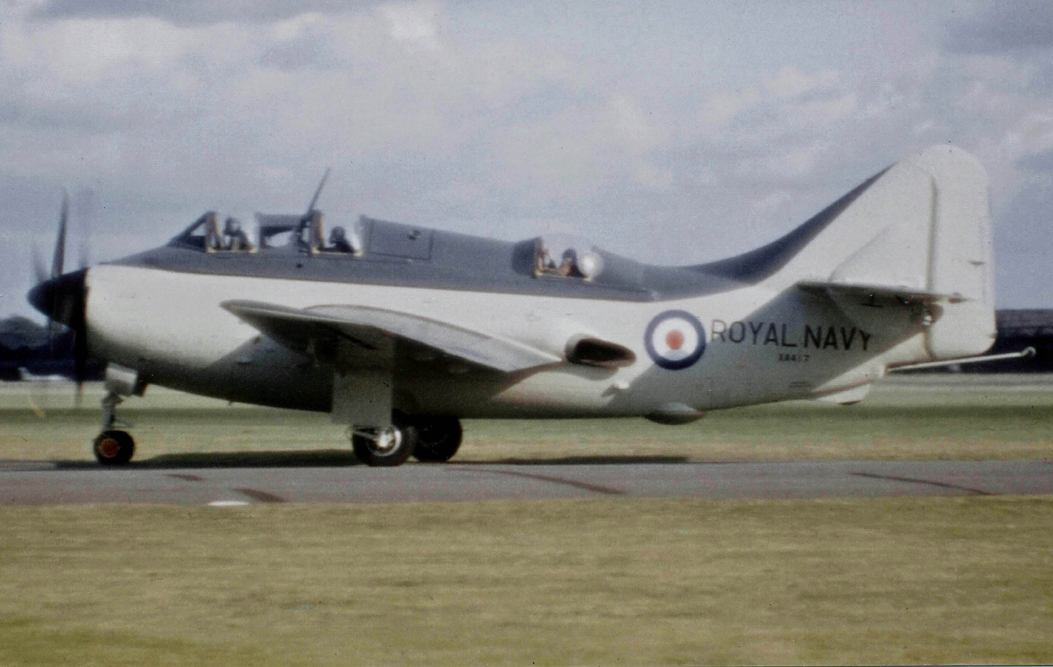
Newly assembled Gannet AS.4 at Manchester Airport, June 1956

The RAN ultimately operated 33 Gannet AS.1 and three T.2 trainers. They were primarily flown from the aircraft carrier HMAS Melbourne as well as the shore base HMAS Albatross near Nowra, New South Wales. During 1967, the RAN withdrew its surviving 24 Gannets from service.

By the mid-1960s, the Royal Navy's Gannet AS.1 and AS.4 models had been replaced by the Westland Whirlwind HAS.7 helicopters. FAA Gannets continued to operate as electronic countermeasures (ECM) aircraft: the ECM.6. Several Gannet AS.4s were converted to COD.4s for Carrier onboard delivery—the aerial supply of mail and light cargo to the fleet.

Starting in May 1958, West Germany's Navy commenced operations of the Gannet AS.4; the country would obtain 15 Gannet AS.4s and a single T.5. German Gannets operated as the ASW squadron of Marinefliegergeschwader 2 (2nd Naval Aviation Wing) from Jagel and Sylt. During 1963, the squadron was reassigned to MFG 3 at Nordholz Naval Airbase, where they remained until replaced by the newer and larger Breguet Br.1150 Atlantic three years later.

During January 1959, Indonesia ordered 18 Gannet AS.4 and T.5s for the Indonesian Navy; they received 17 AS4 (converted from AS1) and 2 Trainers (also upgraded). These were purchased from Fairey via the Ministry of Supply and were re-modelled from existing Gannet AS.1s and T.2s prior to delivery. Several were used as ground-based trainers only. Additional Gannets were later acquired by other countries.

=== Accidents and mishaps ===
- 21 November 1958 – Fairey Gannet AS.1, WN345, suffered a belly landing during a test programme, forced by a partially deployed nose wheel. The pilot landed gear-up on a foam-covered runway at RAF Bitteswell, suffering minimal damage. After repair, the Gannet was back in the air within weeks.
- 30 January 1959 – A Royal Australian Navy Gannet on a trip from Bankstown to Nowra broke up in mid-flight over the Sydney suburb of Sylvania, killing the pilot.
- 29 July 1959 – Royal Navy Fairey Gannet AS.4, XA465, unable to lower the undercarriage, made a power-on deck belly landing into the crash barrier on HMS Centaur. The crew was uninjured but the airframe was written off, salvaged in Singapore, but ending up at the fire dump of Singapore Naval Base.
- 9 April 1962 – Two Fairey Gannet AEW.3s of 849 Sqn FAA RN (XL499 "426" and XP197 "414") collided at night and crashed into the English Channel 15 miles off The Lizard, Cornwall. All six crew were killed.
- 23 January 1964 – Royal Navy Fairey Gannet ECM.6 XG832 suffered double engine failure caused by a phosphor bronze bushing on the idler gear of the port engine's primary accessory drive failing. Fine metal particles from the gear were carried away by the shared oil system of the two engines, causing both to be destroyed. All three crew bailed out near St Austell and survived.
- 12 May 1966 – German Navy AS.4 UA-115 crashed shortly after takeoff from Kaufbeuren, killing all three crew members. The crash was deemed the result of pilot error.

=== Harness restraint issues ===
Tests on the harness restraint system in the Gannet were carried out after a midflight failure due to the release cables binding. The accident was the result of an unrelated engine failure, but the primary issue was the failure of the harness quick-release mechanism.

A brief report in Cockpit, Q4 1973, concerning the accident:

A Gannet was launched at night from Ark Royal and climbed to 4,000 ft. Shortly afterwards the starboard engine ran down to 60%. Attempts to feather and brake the engine, and a subsequent re-light were unsuccessful and the aircraft was unable to maintain height. (It is considered that the most likely cause of the accident was disconnection of the HP cock linkage). Both observers bailed out at 1,800 ft, but when the pilot, Lieutenant Keith Jones, tried to bail out he could not free himself from the 'Negative g' strap. However, the rest of the harness had fallen clear and so the pilot was committed to a ditching without any restraint from shoulder or lap straps. This was successfully accomplished and the aircrew were all recovered safely and uninjured ... Although the ditching was successful, the most disturbing factor of the accident was the inability of the pilot to release himself from 'Negative g' strap ...

== Variants ==
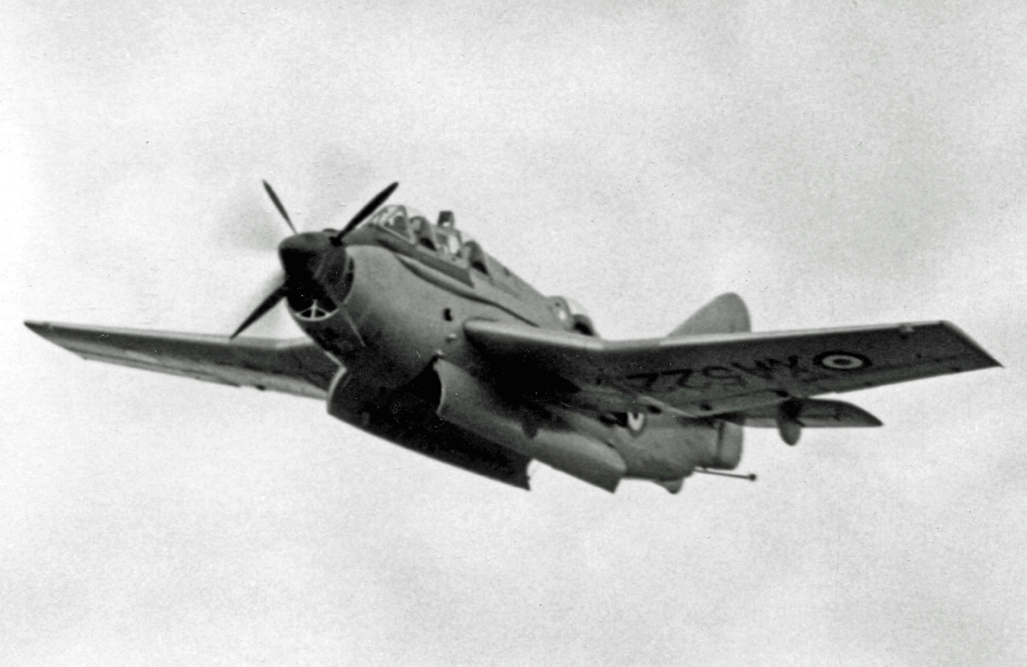
Gannet T.2 advanced trainer demonstrating in 1955 with one-half of the Double Mamba shut down and weapons bay open

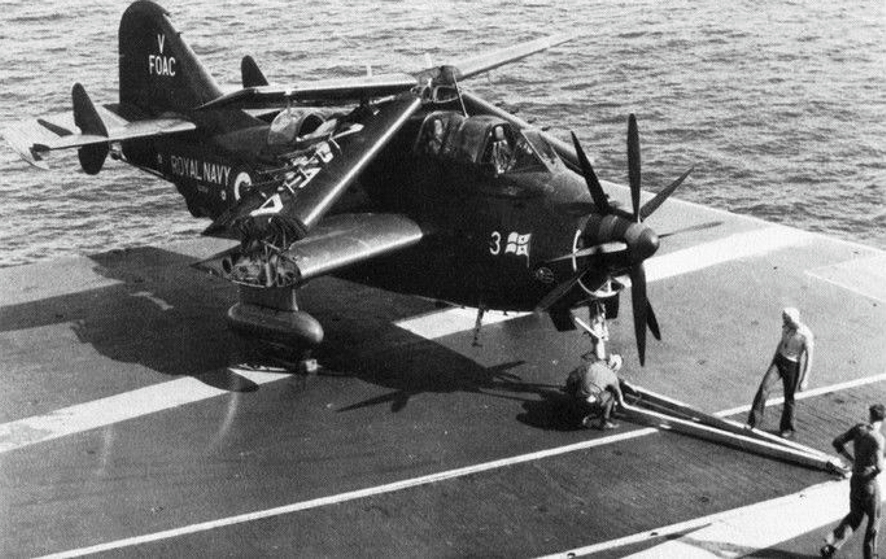
A Gannet COD.4 from HMS Victorious (R38), in 1965

Type	Role	Number built	Notes
Type Q	Anti-submarine warfare	3	Three prototypes were ordered, two in August 1946 and one with a rear cockpit mockup was ordered in July 1949. The first VR546 first flew on 19 September 1949 followed by the second VR577 on 6 July 1950. The third WE488 first flew in May 1951 and all three were powered by the Double Mamba ASMD.1.
AS.1	Anti-submarine warfare	183	
T.2	Dual control trainer version of AS.1	38	1 converted from AS.1
AEW.3	Airborne early warning	44	Separate build
AS.4	Anti-submarine warfare	75	1 converted from AS.1
COD.4	Carrier onboard delivery	6	Converted from AS.4
T.5	Dual control trainer version of AS.4	11	3 converted from T.2
ECM.6	Electronic countermeasures	9	Converted from AS.4; initially classed as AS.6
AEW.7	Airborne early warning	0	Proposal for radical upgrade of AEW.3

== Operators ==
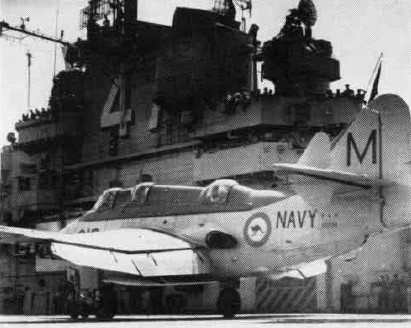
An Australian Gannet AS.1 on the USS Philippine Sea in 1958.

Australia

- Fleet Air Arm
  - 724 Squadron RAN - AS.1 & T.2 (1955-58 & 1961-66)
  - 725 Squadron RAN - AS.1 & T.2 (1958–61)
  - 816 Squadron RAN - AS.1 & T.2 (1955–67)
  - 817 Squadron RAN - AS.1 (1955–58)

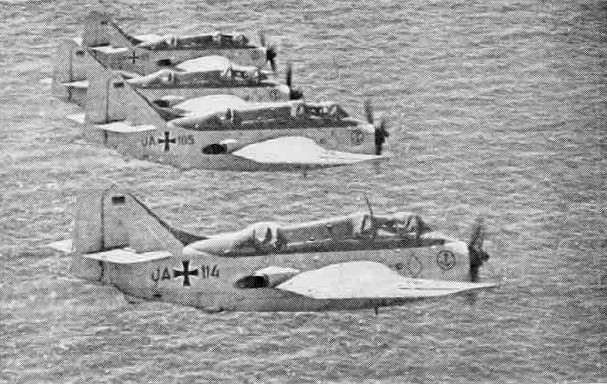
German Gannets in flight, in 1960.

West Germany

- Marineflieger
  - Marinefliegergeschwader 2 (1958–1963)
  - Marinefliegergeschwader 3 (1963–1966)

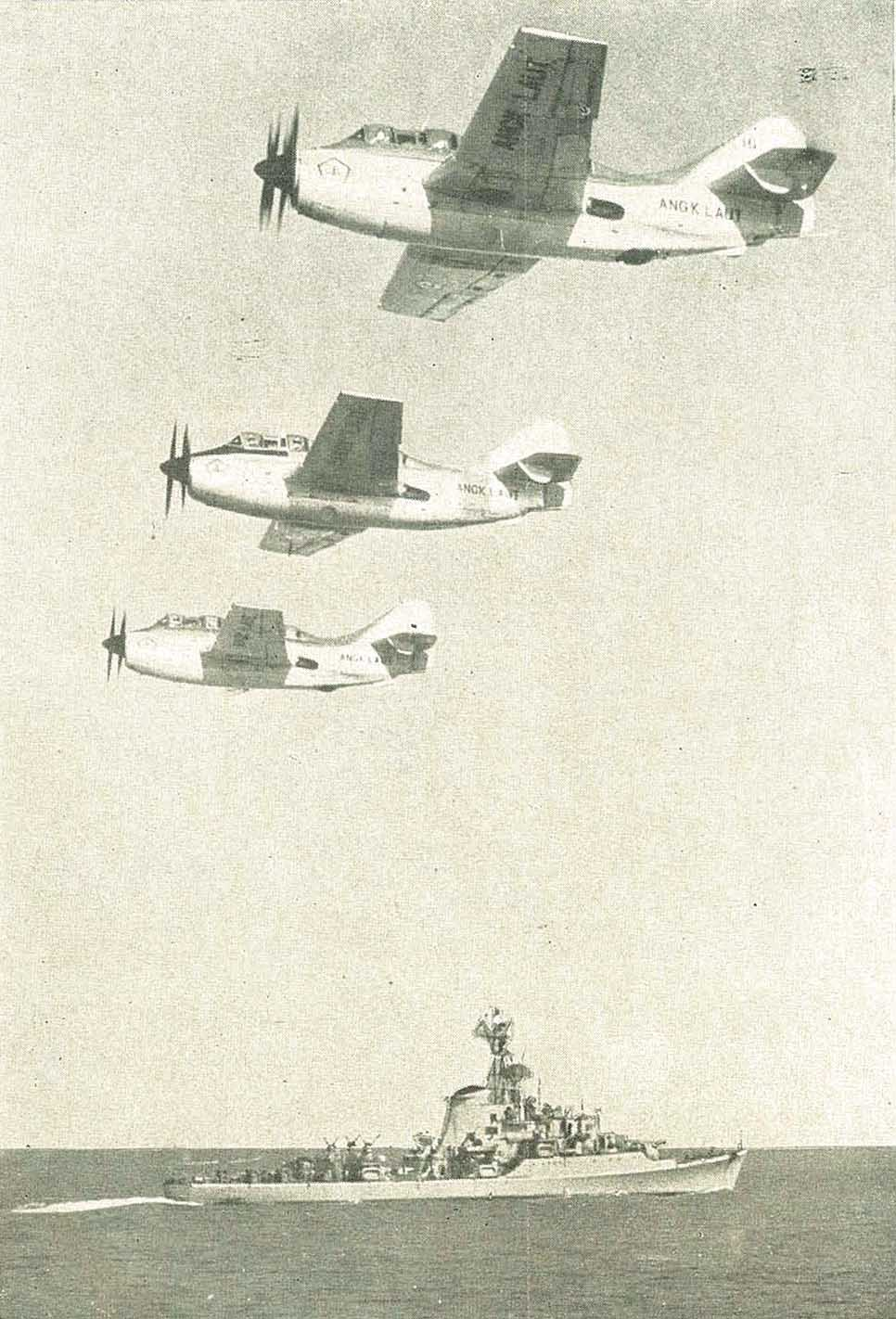
Indonesian Gannets in formation over an Imam Bondjol-class destroyer escort in 1960.

Indonesia

- Indonesian Navy Naval Aviation

United Kingdom

- Royal Navy Fleet Air Arm
  - 700 Naval Air Squadron - AS.1, T.2 & AS.4 (1955–61)
    - 700G Squadron - AEW.3 (1959–60)
  - 703 Naval Air Squadron - AS.1 (1953–55)
    - 703X Flight - AS.1 (1954)
  - 719 Naval Air Squadron - AS.1 & T.2 (1955–59)
  - 728 Naval Air Squadron - T.2 (1957)
  - 737 Naval Air Squadron - AS.1 & T.2 (1955–57)
  - 744 Naval Air Squadron - AS.1 (1955–56)
  - 796 Naval Air Squadron - AS.1 & T.2 (1957–58)
  - 810 Naval Air Squadron - AS.4 (1959–60)
  - 812 Naval Air Squadron - AS.1 & T.2 (1955–56)
  - 814 Naval Air Squadron - T.2 & AS.4 (1957–59)
  - 815 Naval Air Squadron - AS.1, T.2 & AS.4 (1956–58)
  - 820 Naval Air Squadron - AS.1 & T.2 (1955–57)
  - 824 Naval Air Squadron - AS.1, T.2 & AS.4 (1955–57)
  - 825 Naval Air Squadron - AS.1, T.2 & AS.4 (1955-56 & 1957-58)
  - 826 Naval Air Squadron - AS.1 (1955)
  - 831 Naval Air Squadron - AS.1, ECM.4 & ECM.6 (1958 & 1959-66)
  - 847 Naval Air Squadron - AS.1 & AS.4 (1956–59)
  - 849 Naval Air Squadron - AEW.3, AS.4, COD.4 & T.5 (1959–78)
  - 1840 Naval Air Squadron Royal Naval Volunteer Reserve - AS.1 & T.2 (1956–57)

== Surviving aircraft ==
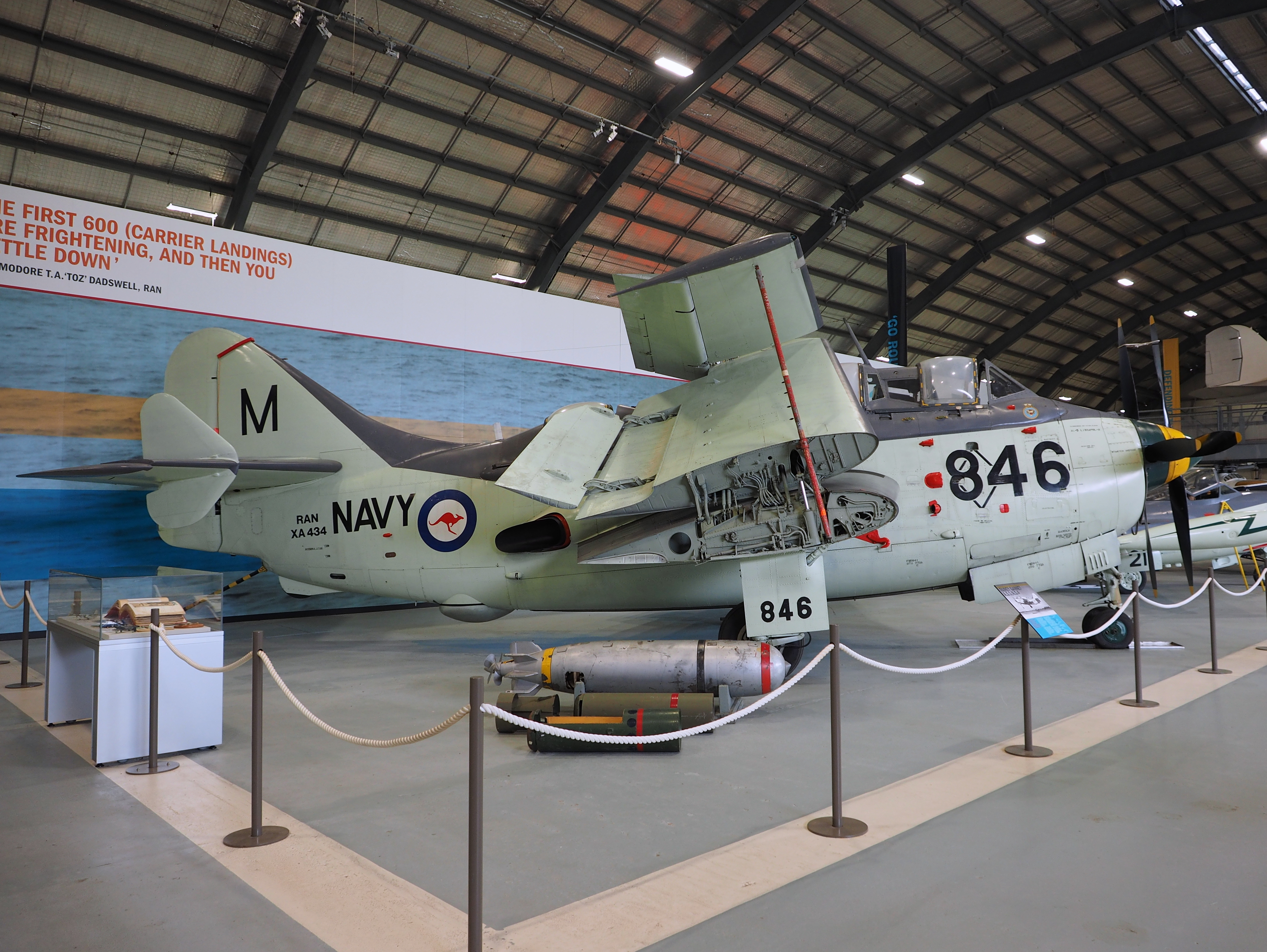
The Australian Fleet Air Arm Museum's Gannet on display in 2015

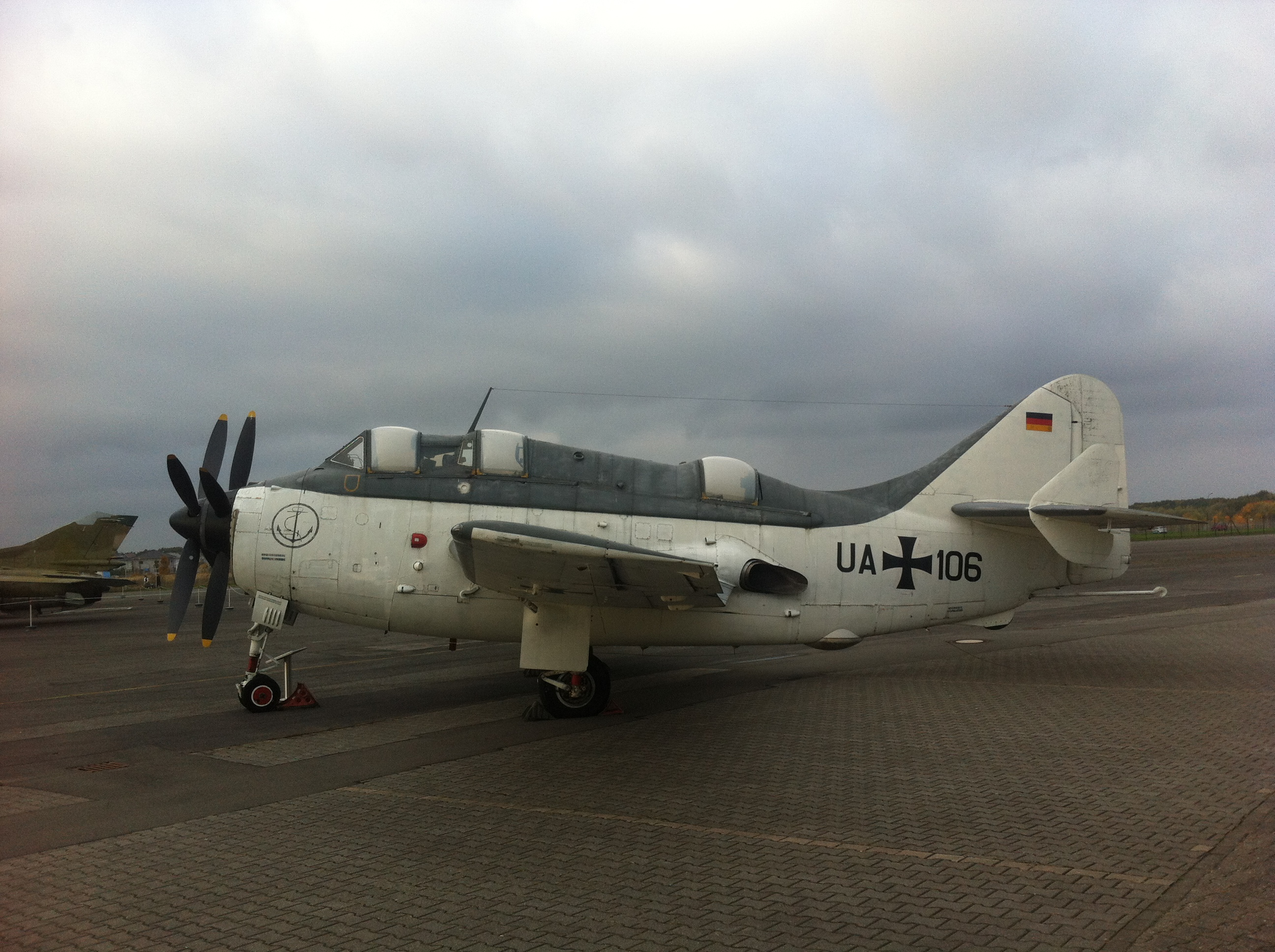
Fairey Gannet at Gatow

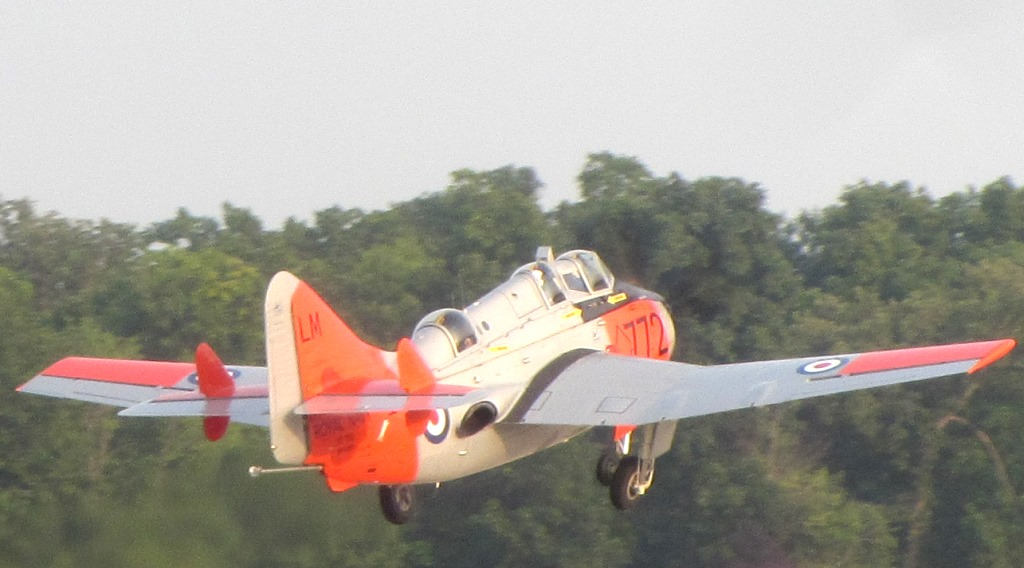
Fairey Gannet XT752/772-LM has been restored to flying condition

=== Australia ===
On display:

- Gannet AS.1 XA334, Camden Museum of Aviation, New South Wales
- Gannet AS.1 XA331, Queensland Air Museum, Caloundra, Queensland.
- Gannet AS.1 XA434 at the Fleet Air Arm Museum, Nowra, New South Wales
- Gannet AS.1 XG789 the Australian National Aviation Museum, Moorabbin, Victoria.
- Gannet T.5 XG888 at the Fleet Air Arm Museum, Nowra, New South Wales

=== Germany ===
On display:

- Gannet AEW.3 XL450, at the Flugausstellung Hermeskeil.
- Gannet AS.4 UA-113, at the Aeronauticum Marinefliegermuseum Nordholz e.V
- Gannet AS.4 UA-112 at the Technik Museum Speyer
- Gannet AS.4 UA-110 painted as UA-106 at Militärhistorisches Museum Flugplatz Berlin-Gatow

=== Indonesia ===
On display:

- Gannet AS.1, Serial no. AS07 painted as AS101 at Juanda Naval Air Station in Surabaya.
- Gannet AS.1, Serial no. AS05 painted as AS105 at Bumi Moro Museum TNI-AL Loka Jala Crana in Surabaya.
- Gannet AS.1, Serial no. AS00 at Satria Mandala Armed Forces Museum in Jakarta.

=== United Kingdom ===
On display:

- Gannet COD.4 XA466 at the Fleet Air Arm Museum, RNAS Yeovilton
- Gannet T.2 XA508, Midland Air Museum, Coventry
- Gannet T.5 XG883, Museum of Berkshire Aviation, Woodley, Berkshire, England
- Gannet ECM.6 XG831 at Davidstow Airfield and Cornwall at War Museum, Cornwall.
- Gannet ECM.6 XA459 at Solway Aviation Museum, England
- Gannet ECM.6 XG797 at the Imperial War Museum at Duxford Airfield, Cambridgeshire
- Gannet AEW.3 XL497 at the Dumfries and Galloway Aviation Museum, Scotland
- Gannet AEW.3 XL502 at Yorkshire Air Museum, England
- Gannet AEW.3 XL503 at the Fleet Air Arm Museum, RNAS Yeovilton
- Gannet AEW.3 XP226 at the Newark Air Museum, England

Under restoration or stored:

- Gannet ECM.6 / AS.4 XA460 currently under restoration at the Ulster Aviation Society Museum, Maze Long Kesh, Lisburn, Northern Ireland
- Gannet T.5 XG882 is on the former RAF Errol, between Dundee and Perth, Scotland; however, the aircraft is unprotected and is derelict
- Gannet AEW.3 G-KAEW (XL500) undergoing a full restoration to airworthiness at South Wales Aviation Museum (SWAM), former RAF St Athan site at Picketston, near Cardiff

=== United States ===
Airworthy:

- Gannet T.5 XT752, Wings of Steel Foundation, Wisconsin

On display:

- Gannet AEW3 XL482 at the Pima Air Museum, Arizona

== Specifications (Gannet AS.1) ==
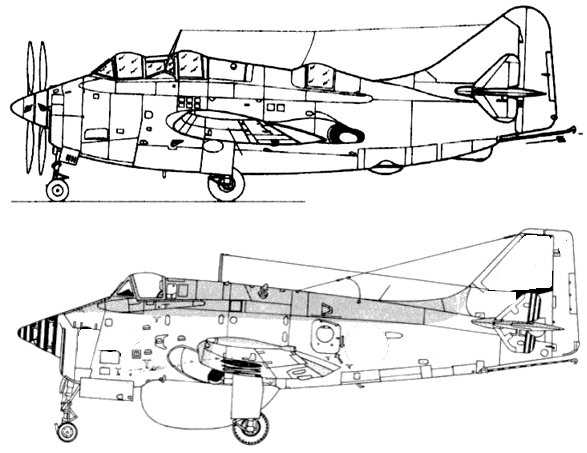
Side view comparison of Fairey Gannet ASW and AEW versions

Data from British Naval Aircraft since 1912

General characteristics

- Crew: 3
- Length: 43 ft 0 in (13.11 m)
- Wingspan: 54 ft 4 in (16.56 m)
- Height: 13 ft 9 in (4.19 m)
- Wing area: 483 sq ft (44.9 m^{2})
- Airfoil: root: NACA 23018; tip: NACA 23010
- Empty weight: 15,069 lb (6,835 kg)
- Max takeoff weight: 19,600 lb (8,890 kg)
- Powerplant: 1 × Armstrong Siddeley ASMD.1 Double Mamba coupled turboprop engine, 2,950 shp (2,200 kW) equivalent
- Propellers: 8-bladed Rotol contra-rotating propeller

Performance

- Maximum speed: 310 mph (500 km/h, 270 kn)
- Endurance: 5–6 hours
- Service ceiling: 25,000 ft (7,600 m)

Armament

- Up to 2,000 lb of bombs, torpedoes, depth charges and rockets

Avionics

- Ekco ASV Mk. 19 radar (ARI 5838)

== See also ==
Aircraft of comparable role, configuration, and era

- Breguet Alizé
- Grumman S-2 Tracker
- Short Seamew
- Tupolev Tu-91

Related lists

- List of aircraft of the Fleet Air Arm
