= Sun Flightcraft =

Former Austrian aircraft manufacturer

- Company type: Privately held company
- Industry: Aerospace
- Headquarters: Innsbruck, Austria
- Products: Powered parachutes
- Owner: Herbert Hofbauer
- Parent: Hofbauer GmbH
- Website: www.sunflightcraft.com

Sun Flightcraft (formally Pro-Design & Sun Flightcraft) is a former Austrian aircraft manufacturer based in Innsbruck, founded by Herbert Hofbauer. The company at one time specialized in the design and manufacture of powered parachutes in the form of ready-to-fly aircraft for the European Fédération Aéronautique Internationale microlight category.

Founded in the early 2000s as a division of Hofbauer GmbH, the company stopped production of its powered parachute design, the Sun Flightcraft Air-Chopper, in about 2008, although it still supplies parts for the design.

The Air-Chopper was noted for its innovative use of the contra-rotating Coax-P aircraft propeller design to eliminate torque effects.

The company continues as an aircraft importer for Airborne Windsports ultralight trikes from Australia as well as a dealer for the Aeropro Eurofox, B&F Fk9, B&F Fk14 Polaris, Evektor Eurostar, TL Ultralight TL-2000 Sting and the Flight Design CT series of aircraft designs, in addition to Rotax aircraft engines.

== Aircraft ==
Summary of aircraft built by Sun Flightcraft
Model name	First flight	Number built	Type
Sun Flightcraft Air-Chopper	circa 2003		Two-seat powered parachute
