= Senftenbach =

- Municipality
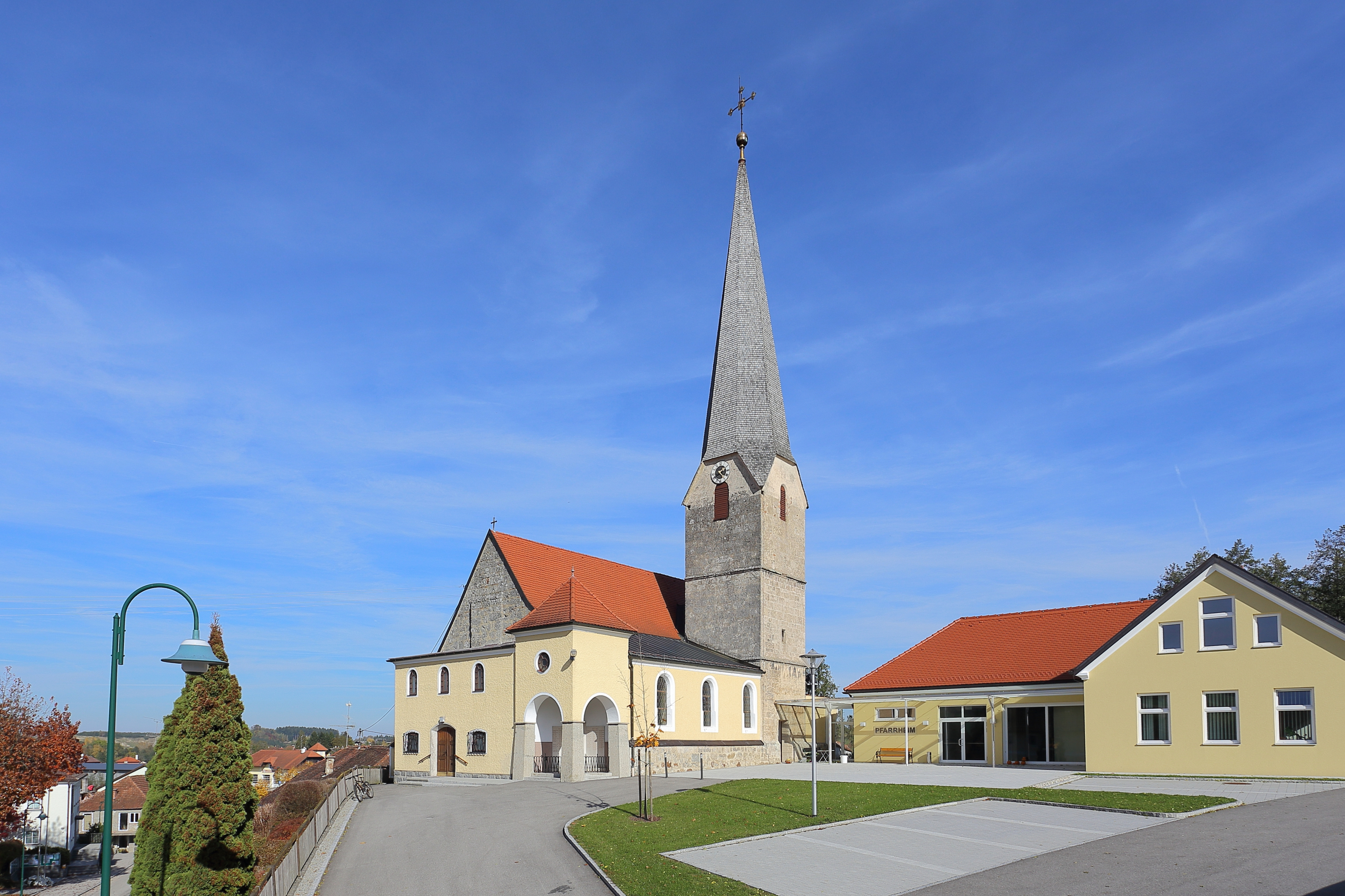

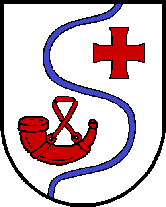
- Coat of arms

- Location within Austria
- Coordinates: 48°15′34″N 13°25′08″E
- Country: Austria
- State: Upper Austria
- District: Ried im Innkreis

Government
  - Mayor: Georg Schrattenecker (ÖVP)

Area
  - Total: 9.73 km^{2} (3.76 sq mi)
- Elevation: 414 m (1,358 ft)

Population (2018-01-01)
  - Total: 772
  - Density: 79.3/km^{2} (205/sq mi)
- Time zone: UTC+1 (CET)
  - Summer (DST): UTC+2 (CEST)
- Postal code: 4973
- Area code: 07751
- Vehicle registration: RI
- Website: www.oberoesterreich. at/senftenbach

Senftenbach is a community in Upper Austria in the district of Ried im Innkreis.

== Geography ==
Senftenbach lies 414 meters above sea level. North to south, it is 3.3 km. From east to west, it is 5 km. The total area is 9.8 km². 19.4% of the area is wooded, while 73.5% of it is used for agriculture. The meaning of the name Senftenbach is "gentle brook", referring to Senftenbach Brook.
