= Armstrong Siddeley Viper =

1950s British turbojet aircraft engine

Viper
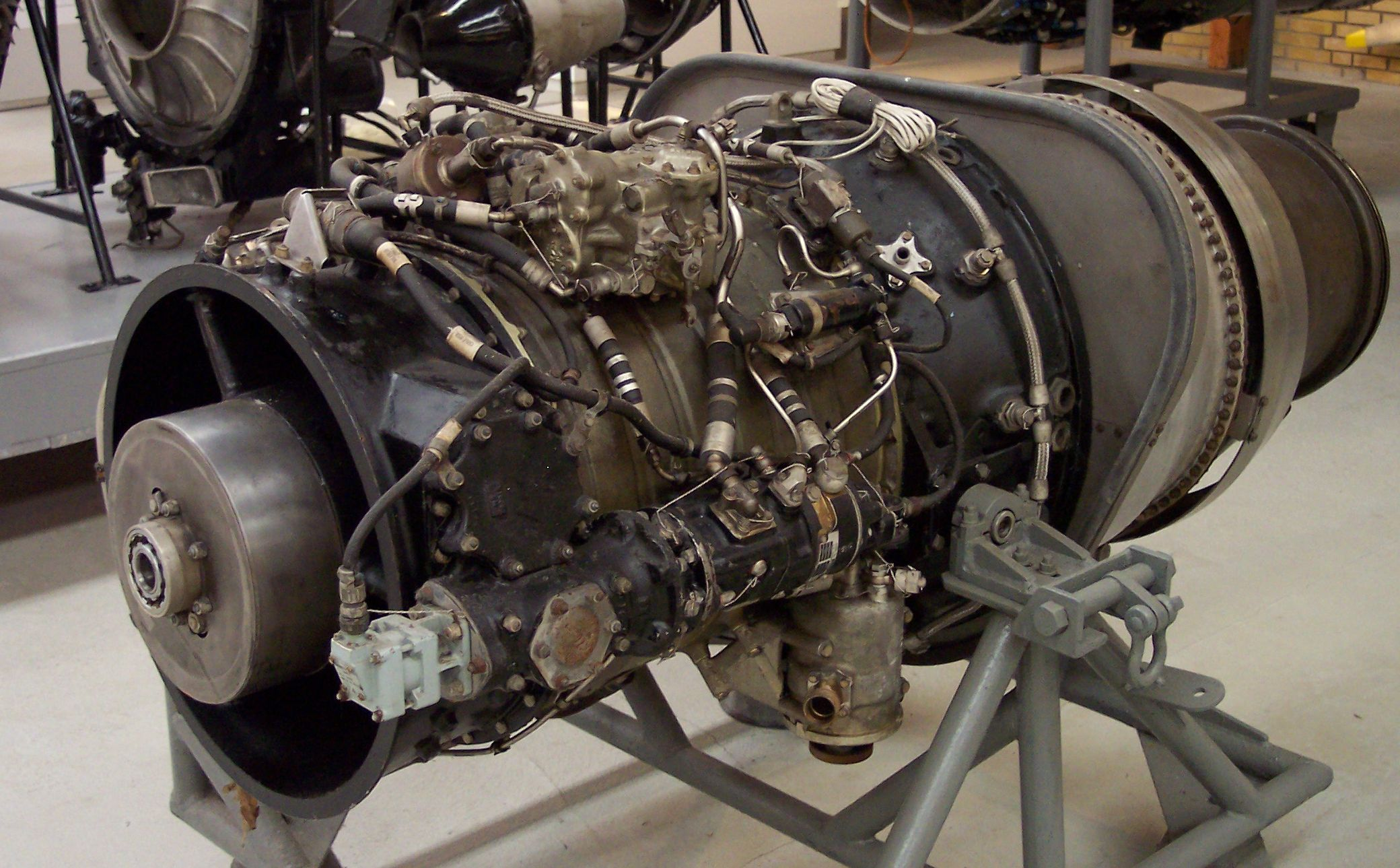
- A preserved Rolls-Royce Viper on display at Danmarks Flymuseum
- Type: Turbojet
- Manufacturer: Armstrong Siddeley; Rolls-Royce Limited
- First run: April 1951
- Major applications: BAC Jet Provost; HS Dominie; Aermacchi MB-326; Soko J-22 Orao
- Developed from: Armstrong Siddeley Adder

The Armstrong Siddeley Viper is a British turbojet engine developed and produced by Armstrong Siddeley and then by its successor companies Bristol Siddeley and Rolls-Royce Limited. It entered service in 1953 and remained in use with the Royal Air Force, powering its Dominie T1 navigation training aircraft, until January 2011.

== Design and development ==
The design originally featured a seven-stage compressor based on their Adder engine — the Viper is in effect a large-scale Adder.

Like the similar J85 built in the United States, the Viper was originally developed as an expendable engine for production versions of the Jindivik target drone. Like the J85, the limited-life components and total-loss oil systems were replaced with standard systems for use in crewed aircraft.

Because it was initially developed as an expendable engine, the Viper was subject to many recurring maintenance issues. This led to the development of the first Power by the Hour program in which operators would pay a fixed hourly rate to Bristol Siddeley for the continual maintenance of the engines.

In the 1970s, Turbomecanica Bucharest and Orao Sarajevo acquired the license for the Viper engine, which propelled various Romanian and Yugoslav built aircraft.

== Variants ==
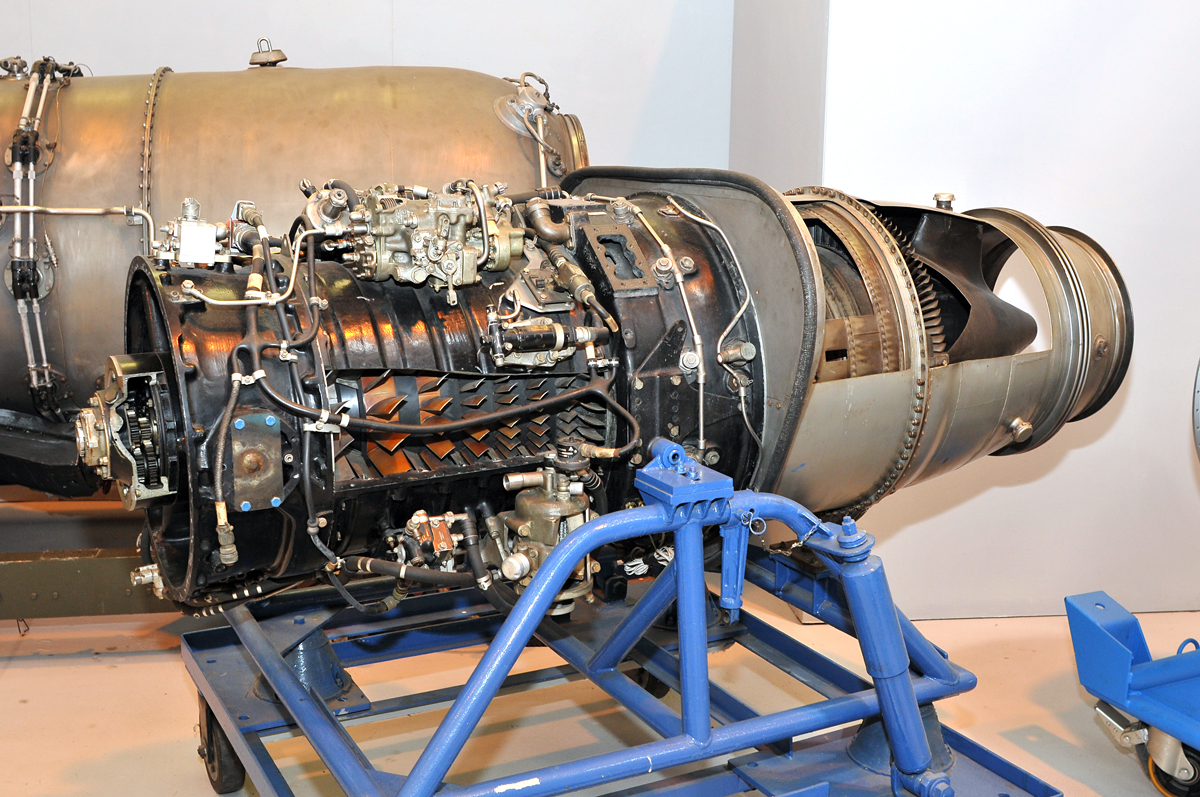
Rolls-Royce Viper in RAF Museum Cosford

Data from:Jane's All the World's Aircraft 1955-56, Jane's all the World's Aircraft 1959-60, Jane's All the World's Aircraft 1962-63

ASV.1
Short life design study; 1,145 lbf (5.09 kN).
ASV.2
Developed short life version, first run in April 1951; 1,145 lbf (5.09 kN).
ASV.3
(Mk.100) Short life for missile/target applications, flight-tested in the tail of an Avro Lancaster November 1952; 1,640 lbf (7.30 kN).
ASV.4
Short life for missile/target applications first run in 1952, 1,750 lbf (7.78 kN).
ASV.5
(Mk. 101) Extended life version for crewed aircraft.
ASV.6
Short life for missile/target applications; 1,900 lbf (8.45 kN).
ASV.7
ASV.7/R
ASV.7 with re-heat; 2,470 lbf (10.99 kN).
ASV.8
(became Viper 8 and Mk.102); Long-life version rated at 1,750 lbf (7.78 kN) for Jet Provost T Mk.3.
ASV.9
(became Viper 9 and Mk.103) Similar to ASV.8 with improved turbine materials; 2,000 lbf (8.90 kN).
ASV.10
Long-life version with re-designed Sapphire-style compressor first run in January 1956; 1,900 lbf (8.45 kN).
ASV.11
(became Viper 11 and Mk.200) ASV.10 with increased mass-flow; 2,500 lbf (11.12 kN).
ASV.12
(became Viper 12) up-rated ASV.11 with higher JPT and rated at 2,700 lbf (12.01 kN)
Viper 8
(Mk.102 / Mk.104): Engines for the Hunting-Percival Jet Provost TMk.3 (Mk.102) and GAF Jindivik Mk.102B target drone (Mk.104).
Viper 9
(Mk.103): Powered the Bell X-14 and Handley Page HP 115 among others.
Viper 11
(Mk.200): Powered the Hunting-Percival Jet Provost TMk.4(Mk202) and GAF Jindivik Mk.3 among others.
Viper 12
see ASV.12 above
Viper 20
(Mk.500 series): Powered the Hawker Siddeley HS.125 and Piaggio-Douglas PD.808 among others.
Viper 22
Built under licence by Piaggio for the Aermacchi MB.326
Mk.100
see ASV.3 above
Mk.101
see ASV.5 above
Mk.102
see ASV.8 above
Mk.103
see ASV.9 and Viper 9 above
Mk.104
see ASV.12 above
Mk.200
see Viper 11 above
Mk.201
Mk.202
see Viper 11 above
Mk.204
Mk.301
Mk.521
Mk.522
Mk.525
Mk.601
Mk.632
Built under licence by Turbomecanica and Orao, as the non-afterburning engine for the IAR-93 Vultur A/MB versions, Soko J-22 Orao 1 version, IAR-99 Standard/Șoim versions, and Soko G-4 Super Galeb.
Mk.633
Built under licence by Turbomecanica and Orao, as the afterburning engine for the IAR-93 Vultur B version, and Soko J-22 Orao 2 version.
M.D.30 Viper
Engines licence-built and developed by Dassault Aviation
M.D.30R Viper
2,200 lbf (9.8 kN) with afterburner.

== Applications ==
- Aermacchi MB-339
- Aermacchi MB-326
- Aero L-29 Delfin (prototype only)
- Atlas Aircraft Impala
- Avro Shackleton
- BAC Jet Provost
- BAC Strikemaster
- Bell X-14
- Blue Origin Charon
- Dassault MD.550 Mystere-Delta
- Embraer AT-26 Xavante
- Folland Midge
- GAF Jindivik
- Hawker Siddeley Dominie
- Handley Page HP.115
- HAL HJT-16 Kiran
- IAR 99
- MTA Long Island Rail Road jet snow blower
- Piaggio PD.808
- PZL TS-11 Iskra (prototype only)
- Saunders-Roe SR.53
- Soko J-22 Orao/IAR-93 Vultur
- Soko G-2 Galeb
- Soko G-4 Super Galeb

== Specifications (Viper ASV.12) ==
Data from

==== General characteristics ====
- Type: Turbojet
- Length: 64.0 in (1,625 mm)
- Diameter: 24.55 in (624 mm)
- Dry weight: 549 lb (249 kg)

==== Components ====
- Compressor: Seven stage axial
- Combustors: Annular, 24 burners
- Turbine: Single stage
- Fuel type: AVTUR, AVTAG
- Oil system: scavenge, metered

==== Performance ====
- Maximum thrust: 2,700 lbf (12 kN) at 13,800 rpm
- Overall pressure ratio: 4.3:1
- Air mass flow: 44 lb/s (20 kg/s)
- Specific fuel consumption: 1.09 lb/(hr lbf)
- Oil consumption: 1.25 pt/h (0.7 L/h)
- Thrust-to-weight ratio: 4.9

== See also ==
Related development

- Armstrong Siddeley Adder
- Armstrong Siddeley Sapphire

Comparable engines

- General Electric J85
- Ishikawajima-Harima J3
- Motorlet M-701
- Turbomeca Gabizo

Related lists

- List of aircraft engines
