= Armstrong Siddeley Adder =

1940s British turbojet aircraft engine

Adder
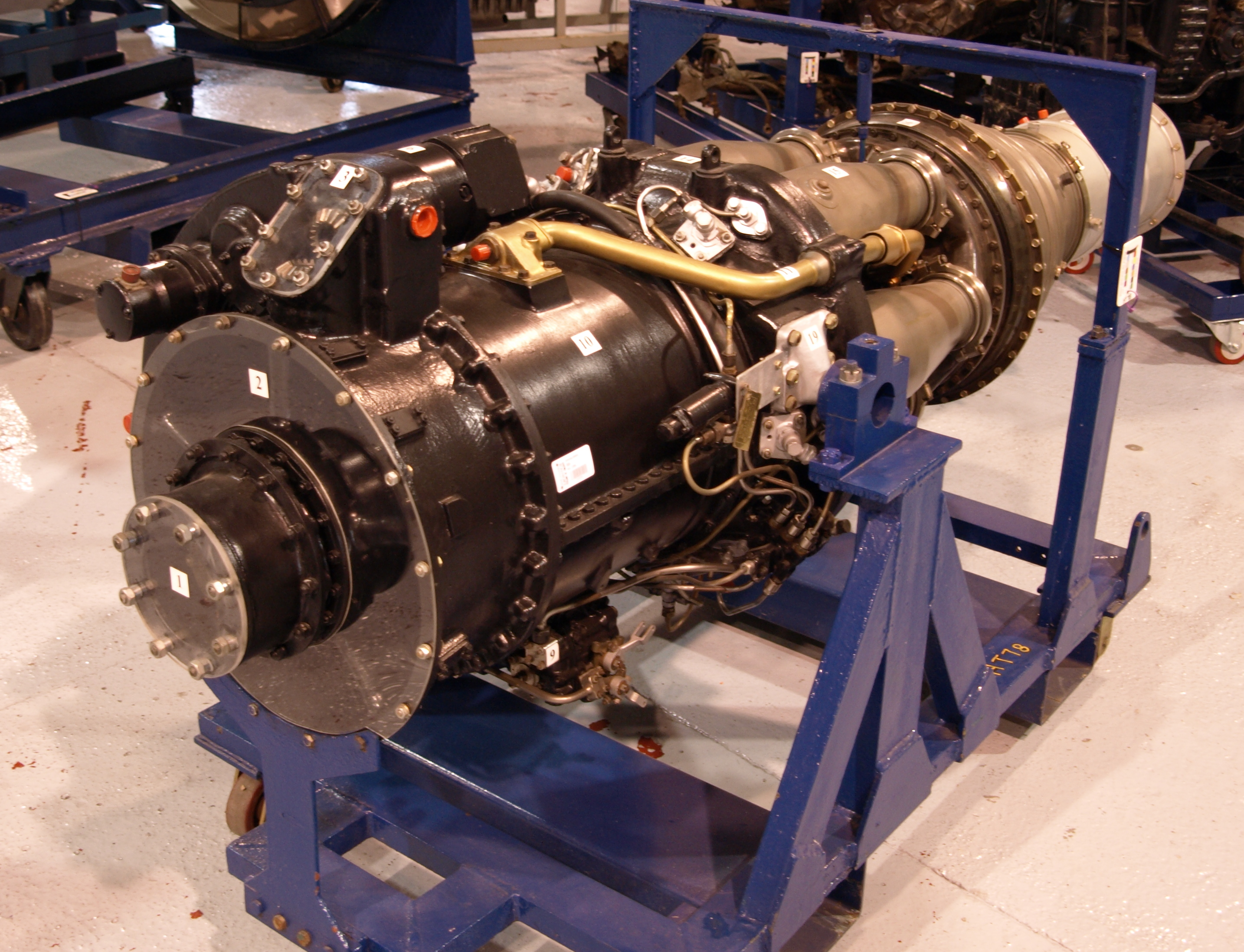
- Armstrong Siddeley Adder turbojet on display at the Rolls-Royce Heritage Trust, Derby
- Type: Turbojet
- Manufacturer: Armstrong Siddeley
- First run: November 1948
- Developed from: Armstrong Siddeley Mamba
- Developed into: Armstrong Siddeley Viper

The Armstrong Siddeley ASA.1 Adder was an early British turbojet engine developed by the Armstrong Siddeley company and first run in November 1948.

== Design and development ==
The Adder, a turbojet derivative of the Armstrong Siddeley Mamba, was originally developed as an expendable engine to power the Jindivik 1 target drone. The engine was then developed into a longer-life engine before evolving into the more-powerful Armstrong Siddeley Viper.

The ASA.1 Adder was flight tested in the rear-turret position of the Avro Lancaster III SW342, the aircraft also having been previously modified and used for icing trials of the Mamba by Armstrong Siddeley's Flight Test Department at Bitteswell.

== Applications ==
- GAF Pika
- Saab 210

== Specifications ==
Data from Aircraft Engines of the World 1953.

==== General characteristics ====
- Type: Turbojet
- Length: 86.7 in (2,200 mm)
- Diameter: 29 in (740 mm)
- Dry weight: 580 lb (260 kg)

==== Components ====
- Compressor: 10-stage axial-flow
- Combustors: six can combustion chambers
- Turbine: 2-stage axial
- Fuel type: Aviation kerosene
- Oil system: dry sump and total loss pressure spray

==== Performance ====
- Maximum thrust: 1,050 lbf (4.7 kN) at 15,000 rpm for take-off; 870 lbf (3.9 kN) max continuous at 14,250 rpm at sea level
- Overall pressure ratio: 5:1
- Air mass flow: 18.2 lb/s (8.2 kg/s)
- Turbine inlet temperature: 870 °C (1,600 °F; 1,140 K) TIT at 15,000 rpm
- Specific fuel consumption: 1.02 lb/lbf/hr (103.98 kg/kN/hr)
- Thrust-to-weight ratio: 0.53

== See also ==
Related development

- Armstrong Siddeley Mamba
- Armstrong Siddeley Viper

Related lists

- List of aircraft engines
