= Armstrong Whitworth Apollo =

Four-engine turboprop airplane

AW.55 Apollo
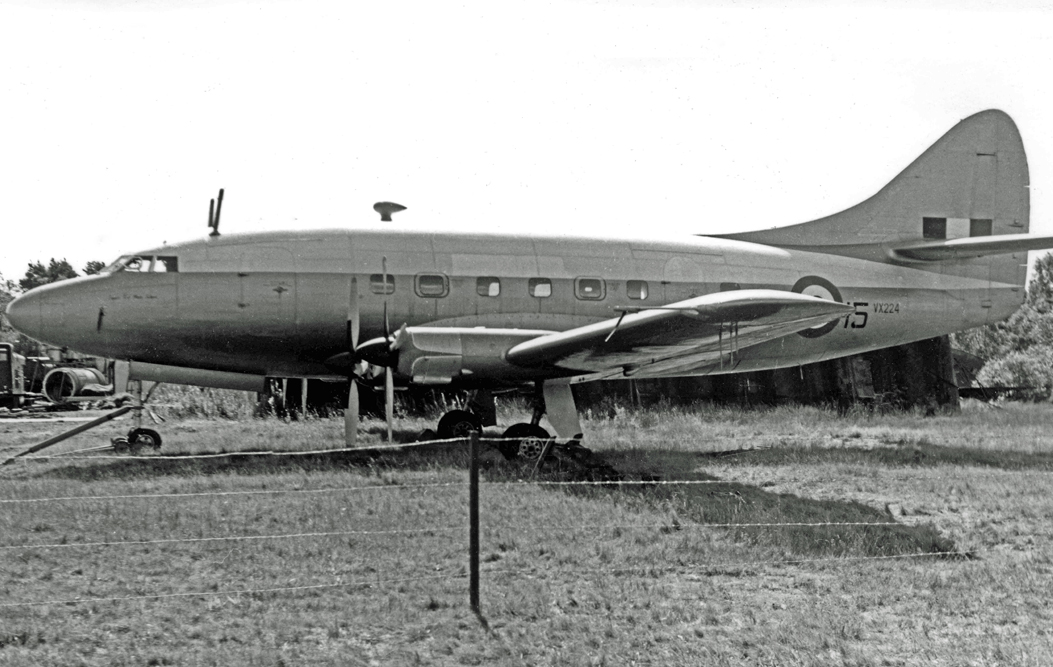
- The second AW.55 Apollo in use by the Empire Test Pilot School at Farnborough in September 1954

General information
- Type: Four-engined turboprop airliner
- Manufacturer: Armstrong Whitworth
- Primary users: Aeroplane & Armament Experimental Establishment Empire Test Pilot's School
- Number built: 2

History
- Introduction date: 1952
- First flight: 1949
- Retired: 1957

The Armstrong Whitworth AW.55 Apollo was a 1940s British four-engine turboprop airliner built by Armstrong Whitworth at Baginton. The aircraft was in competition with the Vickers Viscount but was beset with engine problems and only two were built.

== Development ==
The requirement resulted from the Brabazon Committee's Type II design, calling for a small, medium-range pressurized aircraft to fly its less-travelled routes which became Air Ministry Specification C.16/46 for an aircraft able to carry 24–30 passengers over 1,000 mi (1,600 km) at a cruising speed of 300 mph (480 km/h).

The resulting design was the AW.55 Apollo, a low-wing cantilever monoplane with retractable tricycle undercarriage. Due to the narrowness of the engines, there was no room in the nacelles for the main wheels which instead folded up into the wings. It had a conventional tail unit with a mid-placed cantilever horizontal tailplane. It had a pressurised fuselage with seating for 26–31 passengers. It was designed to use the Armstrong Siddeley Mamba ASM.2 which was expected to produce 1,270 shp (950 kW) plus 307 lbf (1,370 N) static thrust for the production aircraft. When the prototype Apollo was ready to fly the engine could only produce 800 shp (600 kW). Two prototypes - one to be completely fitted out - and a static test fuselage were ordered by the Ministry of Supply and construction started in 1948. The prototype (serial VX220) first flew from the grass field at Baginton, Coventry on 10 April 1949 for a thirty-minute test flight.

The aircraft was unstable and underpowered and after just nine hours of test flying, it was grounded to try to solve some of the problems. Test flying resumed in August 1949 but the aircraft had further engine problems. Changes were made to the design of the tail unit including fitting a dorsal fin and increasing the fin area to improve the flying qualities. In October 1950, a limited category Certificate of Airworthiness was granted to allow the aircraft to carry non-fare paying passengers. One proving flight - between Baginton and Paris taking 1 hr 26 min - was carried out on 12 March 1951.

Further engine problems stopped the trial and test flights. The company started a selling campaign to European airlines but the problems with performance and continual engine difficulties caused the decision in June 1952 to abandon development of the aircraft. The competing Brabazon IIB design the Vickers Viscount powered by the Rolls-Royce Dart became a best-selling turboprop in the 1950s and 60s. The second prototype was expected to use the Mamba 3 to give it a maximum weight of 45,000 lb.

== Operational history ==
Although the development programme was cancelled the two prototypes had been paid for by the Ministry of Supply and the prototype aircraft entered service at the Aeroplane & Armament Experimental Establishment at Boscombe Down in September 1952. The second aircraft (serial VX224) followed in September 1953 and was later used by the Empire Test Pilot's School during 1954 for multi-engine pilot training. The prototype was broken up in 1955 and the second aircraft was passed to the Structures Department at RAE Farnborough. The aircraft fuselage was used at Farnborough for water tank pressure testing until it was scrapped in the 1970s.

== Operators ==
United Kingdom

- Aeroplane & Armament Experimental Establishment
- Empire Test Pilot's School

== Specifications ==
Data from British Civil Aircraft since 1919, Armstrong Whitworth Aircraft since 1913

General characteristics

- Crew: 3
- Capacity: 26–31 passengers
- Length: 71 ft 6 in (21.79 m)
- Wingspan: 92 ft 0 in (28.04 m)
- Height: 26 ft 0 in (7.92 m)
- Wing area: 986 sq ft (91.6 m^{2})
- Empty weight: 30,800 lb (13,971 kg)
- Gross weight: 45,000–47,000 lb (20,412–21,319 kg)
- Fuel capacity: 970 imp gal (1,160 US gal; 4,400 L)
- Powerplant: 4 × Armstrong Siddeley Mamba AS.1 axial-flow turboprops, 1,010 shp (750 kW) each

Performance

- Maximum speed: 330 mph (530 km/h, 290 kn)
- Cruise speed: 276 mph (444 km/h, 240 kn)
- Range: 940 mi (1,510 km, 820 nmi)
- Service ceiling: 28,000 ft (8,500 m)
- Rate of climb: 1,500 ft/min (7.6 m/s) at sea level

== See also ==
Aircraft of comparable role, configuration, and era

- Airspeed Ambassador
- Vickers Viscount
