= GAF Jindivik =

Australian target drone

Jindivik
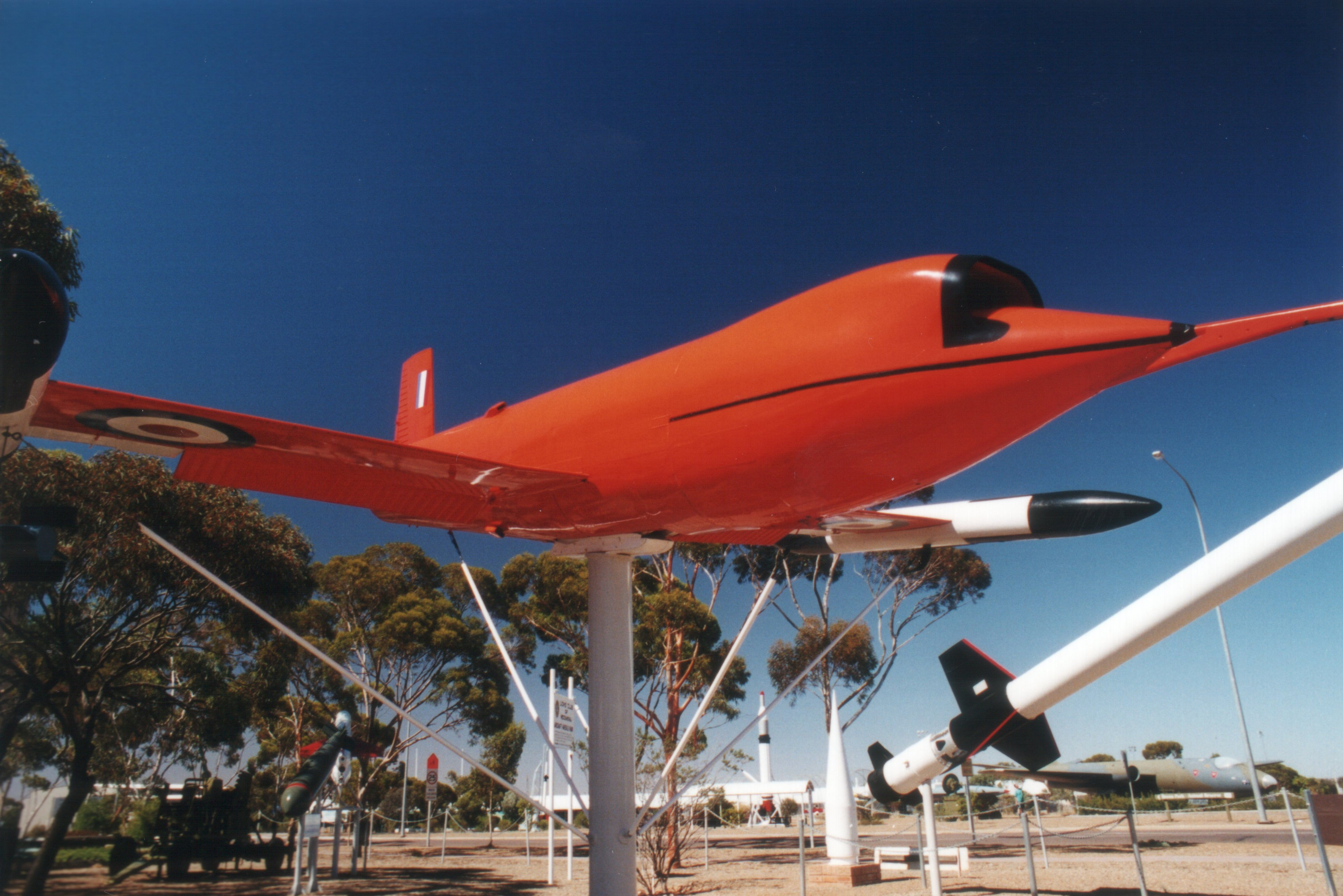

General information
- Type: target drone
- Manufacturer: Government Aircraft Factories
- Number built: 517

History
- Manufactured: 1952–1986, 1997
- First flight: 28 August 1952

The GAF Jindivik is a radio-controlled target drone produced by the Australian Government Aircraft Factories (GAF). The name is from an Aboriginal Australian word meaning "the hunted one". Two manually-controlled prototypes, were built as the GAF Pika (Project C) as a proof of concept to test the aerodynamics, engine and radio control systems, serialled A92-1/2, 'B-1/2'. The radio-controlled Jindivik was initially designated the Project B and received serials in the A93 series. Pika is an Aboriginal Australian word meaning flier.

== Design and development ==
The Jindivik was developed as a result of a bilateral agreement between Australia and the UK regarding guided missile testing. While the UK provided the missiles, Australia provided test facilities, such as the Woomera Test Range. As a result of the talks, Australia gained the contract for developing a target drone to Ministry of Supply specification E.7/48. The specification called for an aircraft capable of a 15-minute sortie at 12,000 metres (40,000 ft). Development began in 1948, with the first flight of the Pika in 1950 and the first flight of the Jindivik Mk.1 in August 1952.

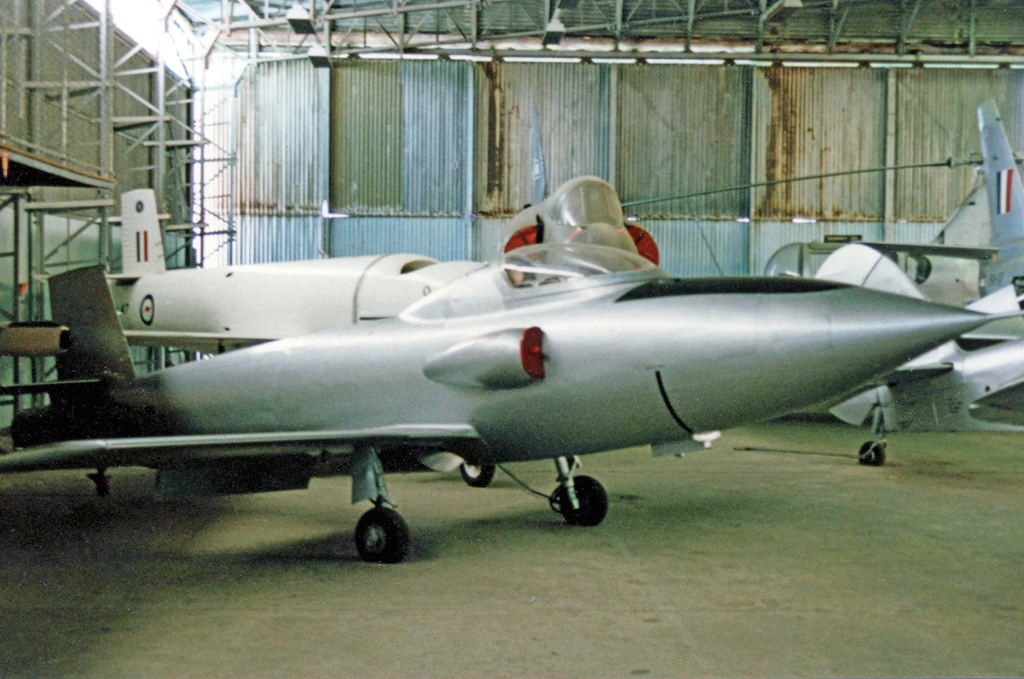
GAF Pika displayed at the RAAF Museum at Point Cook, Victoria in 1988

The manually piloted prototype, known as the Pika, had side air intakes (to make room for the cockpit) and retractable undercarriage operated from a pneumatic reservoir. The remotely-piloted version, the Jindivik, followed the same basic form except that it had a single skid instead of an undercarriage and a dorsal air intake located where the Pika's cockpit was. The Jindivik Mk.1 was powered by an Armstrong Siddeley Adder (ASA.1) turbojet, which had been developed as a disposable engine for the project. Only 14 Mk.1s were ever made. The Mk.2 was powered by a 7.3 kilonewtons (1,640 lbf) Armstrong Siddeley Viper engine. The Viper was also intended for a short lifespan – about 10 hours, but a "long life" version was also produced for conventional aircraft.

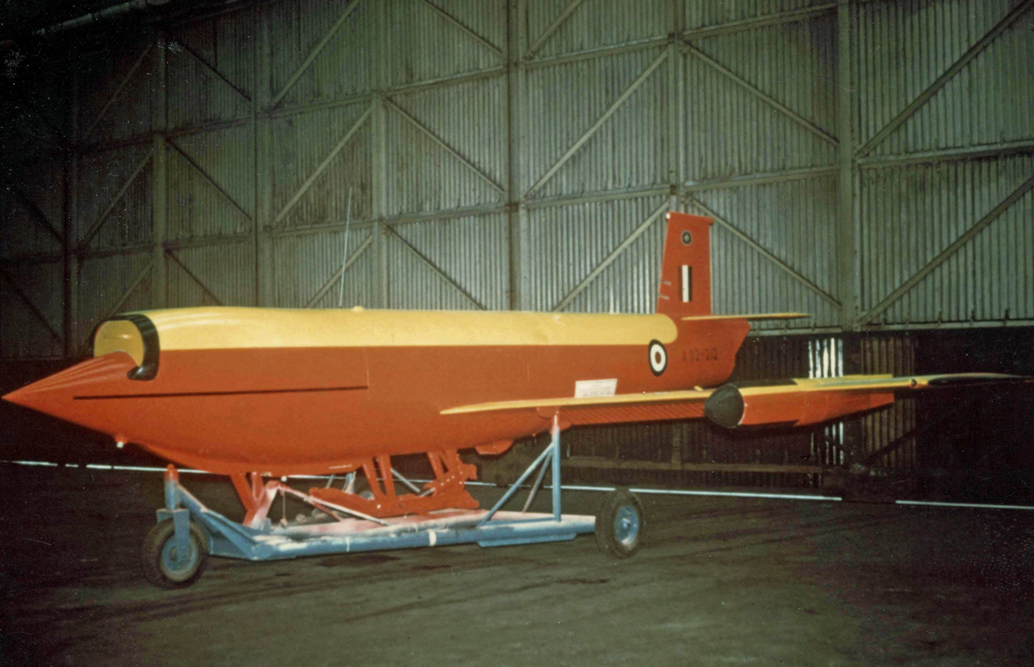
A Jindivik 102B after assembly by Fairey Aviation at Manchester for use on the UK test range at Aberporth

The control systems were manufactured by various firms including Elliott Brothers, GEC and McMichael, with assistance from the Royal Aircraft Establishment. Control was maintained through an autopilot that received radio commands from the ground, rather than direct flight by a ground controller. Eighteen commands could be issued to the autopilot with six further commands for the operation of other onboard equipment. The drone was launched via a self-steering trolley. At 110 knots (200 km/h; 130 mph), the drone was designed to apply its flaps, push the elevators up and release the trolley. Landing was made at 150–125 knots (278–232 km/h; 173–144 mph). Two controllers (azimuth and elevation) were used to align the drone on the runway. On landing it touched down on its skid and banking would cause the wingtip "shoes" to touch the runway, which controlled its path down the runway as it slowed.

Between 1952 and 1986, a total of 502 aircraft were produced. Examples for use in the United Kingdom were shipped by surface transport, and assembled and tested by Fairey Aviation at Hayes, Middlesex, and Manchester Airport. In 1997, the production line was re-opened to build another 15 for Britain.

== Operators ==
Since production began, the Jindivik has been used by the Royal Australian Air Force, the Royal Australian Navy's Fleet Air Arm, and the Royal Air Force. The last Australian Jindiviks were taken out of service in the late 1990s and were replaced by the Kalkara. Most UK tests were conducted by the Royal Aircraft Establishment at their Llanbedr establishment and fired over the nearby Aberporth Airport test range in west Wales. In the UK, the drone was used in the development of the Bristol Bloodhound, English Electric Thunderbird, and Seaslug surface-to-air missiles, and the de Havilland Firestreak air-to-air missile. Small numbers of the aircraft have also been operated by both Sweden, who used the Jindivik 2, and the United States.

Australia

- Royal Australian Air Force
- Fleet Air Arm (RAN)

Sweden

- Swedish Air Force

United Kingdom

- Royal Air Force

United States

- United States Navy – 42 Mk 303B

== Variants ==
Jindivik 1
Initial aircraft powered by Armstrong Siddeley ASA.1 Adder, 14 built.
Jindivik 2
Jindivik Mk 102
Jindivik 2 modified by Fairey Aviation for use in United Kingdom.
Jindivik 2A
development model with 1,750 lbf (7.78 kN) Armstrong Siddeley ASV.8 Viper (1,750 lbf) new intake and wider wings, three built.
Jindivik 2B
production model of 2A, 76 built.
Jindivik Mk 102B
as for Mk 102 based on 2B airframe
Jindivik 3A
ASV.11 Viper engine, with new equipment for higher altitude
Jindivik 3B
as 3A but ASV.8 Viper engine
Mk 103B
for the United Kingdom
Mk 203B
for the Royal Australian Navy
Mk 303B
for the United States Navy

== Surviving aircraft ==
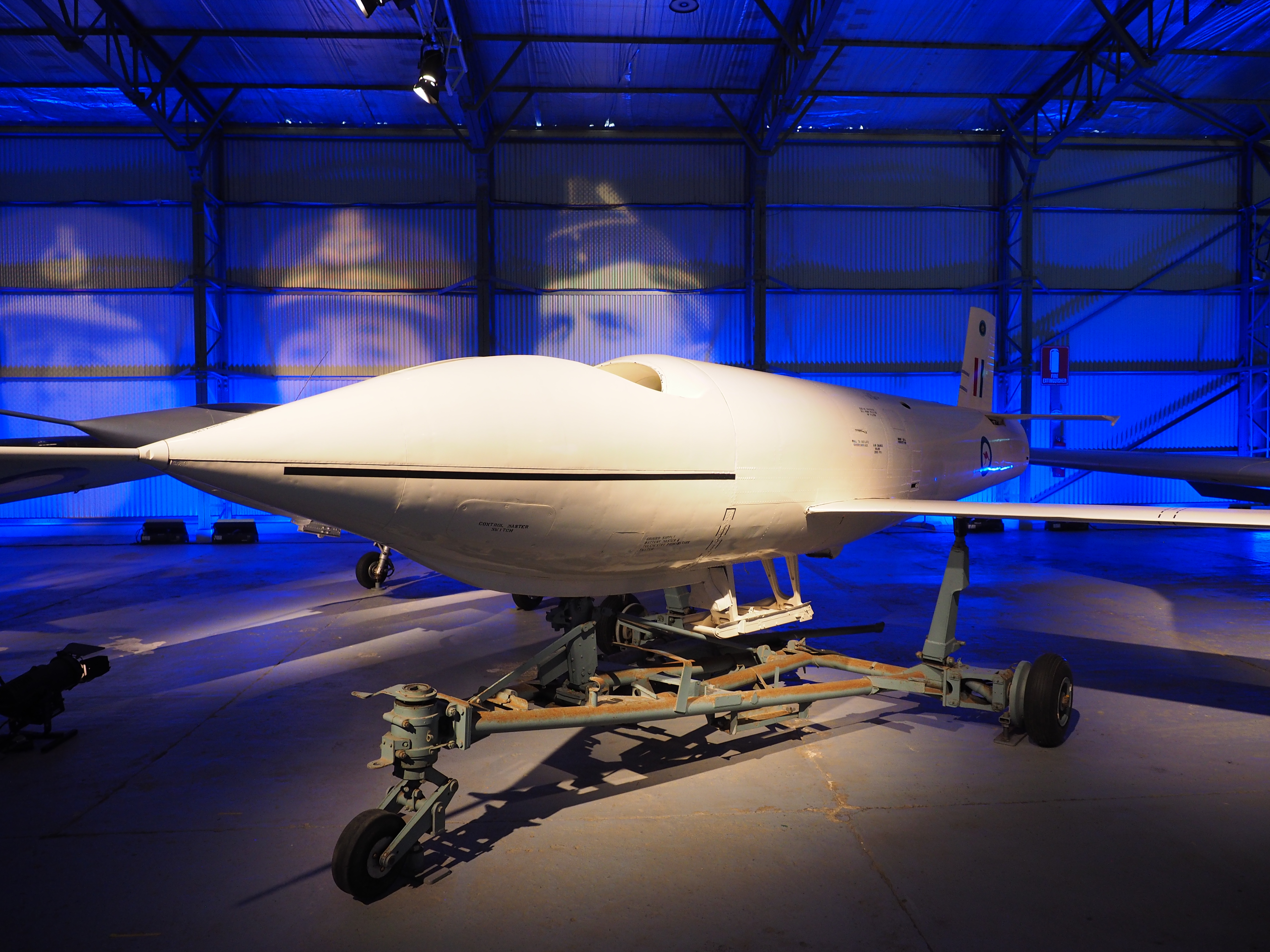
GAF Jindivik A92-47 on display at the RAAF Museum in 2025

1 Pika and 22 Jindiviks are preserved as either in storage or on display in museums or collections around the world ( 1 in Sweden, 8 in UK, 13 in Australia).
Pika – Project C
A93-2, second pilot–controlled Pika prototype, RAAF Museum, Point Cook
Jindivik – Project B
A92-9 mark 1, painted as B-9 prototype, mounted on a pole at RAAF Base Edinburgh
A92-22 mark 2, previously on a pole at Jervis Bay, now with HARS Parkes
A92-47 mark 2, displayed on launch trolley RAAF Museum, Point Cook
A92-UNK? mark 2? as “RB01” drone (flown in Sweden in 1959?), displayed at Vidsal Test Range Museum, Sweden
A92-418 mark 3A, as WRE-418 displayed on a pole at Woomera
A92-480 mark 3A, pole-mounted gate guardian, RAF Llanbedr, Wales
A92-492 mark 3A, composite owned by Australian National Aviation Museum, on loan to Benalla
A92-511 mark 303A, mounted on pole, RAAF Base Wagga
A92-520 mark 303A, as WRE-520 composite in private collection SA
A92-529 mark 303A, as WRE-529 composite at Classic Jets Museum
A92-601 mark 3B, as WRE-60 composite displayed hanging from the roof Queensland Air Museum
N11-609 mark 3B, displayed on handling trolley, RAN Fleet Air Arm Museum, Nowra
A92-466 mark 303BL, Boscombe Down Aviation Collection, England
A92-708 mark 103, Newark Air Museum, Newark-on-Trent, England
A92-740 mark 203B, crashed fuselage on display, Caernarfon Airworld Aviation Museum, Wales
N11-743 mark 203B, named "David Manolan", owned by AARG, stored with handling trolley at Hallam, Victoria
N11-750 mark 203B, displayed on launch trolley, Fighterworld RAAF Base Williamtown
N11-752 mark 203B, displayed on handling trolley, South Australian Aviation Museum, Adelaide
A92-804 mark 104AL, Royal Air Force Museum Cosford, England
A92-808 mark 104AL (RAF ZJ489) fuselage only, modified with cockpit, Caernarfon Airworld Aviation Museum, Wales
A92-901 mark 104A (RAF ZJ496), Farnborough Air Sciences Trust, Farnborough Airport
A92-908 mark 104A, held to become gate guardian at RAF Llanbedr, Wales

== Specifications (Jindivik 3B – short span wings) ==
Data from Jane's All The World's Aircraft 1982–83.

General characteristics

- Length: 8.15 m (26 ft 9 in)
- Wingspan: 6.32 m (20 ft 9 in)
- Height: 2.08 m (6 ft 10 in)
- Wing area: 6.32 m^{2} (68.0 sq ft)
- Airfoil: NACA 64A-106
- Empty weight: 1,315 kg (2,900 lb)
- Max takeoff weight: 1,451 kg (3,200 lb)
- Powerplant: × Rolls-Royce Viper Mk.201 turbojet, 12.36 kN (2,780 lbf) thrust

Performance

- Maximum speed: 908 km/h (564 mph, 490 kn)
- Range: 1,038 km (645 mi, 560 nmi)
- Service ceiling: 17,375 m (57,000 ft)

== See also ==
Aircraft of comparable role, configuration, and era

- Aviolanda AT-21
- Ryan Firebee
- Martin KDM Plover

Related lists

- List of unmanned aerial vehicles
