= Rolls-Royce Dart =

1940s British turboprop aircraft engine

Dart
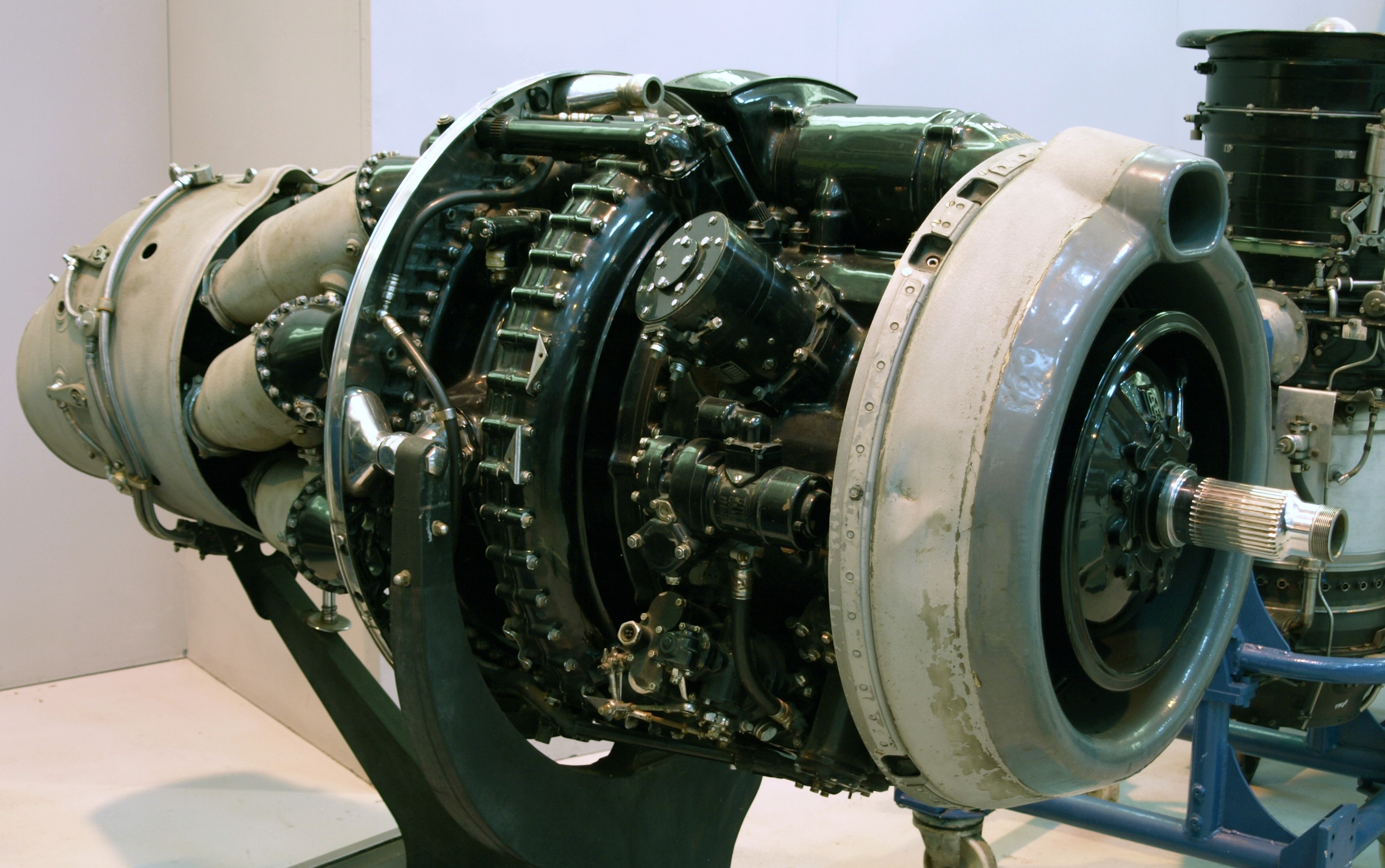
- Rolls-Royce Dart RDa. 3 Mk506
- Type: Turboprop
- Manufacturer: Rolls-Royce Limited
- First run: 1946
- Major applications: Avro 748; Breguet Alizé; Fokker F27; Grumman Gulfstream I; Vickers Viscount
- Number built: more than 7,100

The Rolls-Royce RB.53 Dart is a turboprop engine designed and manufactured by Rolls-Royce Limited. First run in 1946, it powered the Vickers Viscount on its maiden flight in 1948. A flight on July 29 of that year, which carried 14 paying passengers between Northolt and Paris–Le Bourget Airport in a Dart-powered Viscount, was the first regularly scheduled airline flight by a turbine-powered aircraft. The Viscount was the first turboprop-powered aircraft to enter airline service - British European Airways (BEA) in 1953.

The Dart was still in production forty years later when the last Fokker F27 Friendships and Hawker Siddeley HS 748s were produced in 1987.

Following the company's convention for naming gas turbine engines after rivers, this turboprop engine design was named after the River Dart.

== History ==
Designed in 1946 by a team led by Lionel Haworth, the Dart engine was derived using experience gained from the earlier more powerful Rolls-Royce Clyde turboprop. A two-stage centrifugal compressor was specified to achieve the desired overall pressure ratio. A 3 stage, shared load, axial turbine was used to drive both the load (via a reduction gearbox) and the compression system. A photo showing a cutaway section of typical Dart engine is given below.

Unlike the Clyde, the engine lacked a free power turbine. Consequently, under normal operating conditions, the power delivered to the propeller could not be modulated at a fixed prop speed.

The Dart was initially rated at 890 shp and first flew in October 1947 mounted to the nose of a converted Avro Lancaster.

Improvements in the design boosted power output to 1,400 shp in the RDa.3, which went into production for the Viscount in 1952. The RDa.6 increased power to 1,600 shp and the RDa.7 to 1,800 shp by incorporating various improvements including a larger diameter second impeller.

Later Darts were rated up to 3,245 shp and remained in production until 1987, with approximately 7,100 produced, flying some 170 million hours.

The Dart was also produced under licence in India by Hindustan Aeronautics Limited.

Haworth and his team later went on to design and develop the larger and more powerful Rolls-Royce Tyne.

== Variants ==
As well as the RB.53 designation each mark of Dart engine was allocated a Ministry of Supply (MoS) "RDa.n" number as well as Mk.numbers.

RDa.1
Initial prototype engines – 1,250 shp (930 kW) plus 300 lbf (1.3 kN) residual thrust
RDa.2
Initial production engines
RDa.3
1,480 hp (1,100 kW) estimated power – 1,345 hp (1,003 kW) shaft power + 350 lbf (1.6 kN) residual thrust at 14,500 rpm
RDa.6
1,670 hp (1,250 kW) estimated power – 1,535 hp (1,145 kW) shaft power + 350 lbf (1.6 kN) residual thrust at 14,500 rpm
RDa.7
1,815 hp (1,353 kW) estimated power – 1,630 hp (1,220 kW) shaft power + 480 lbf (2.1 kN) residual thrust at 15,000 rpm
RDa.7/1
1,910 hp (1,420 kW) estimated power – 1,730 hp (1,290 kW) shaft power + 470 lbf (2.1 kN) residual thrust at 15,000 rpm
RDa.7/2
2,020 hp (1,510 kW) estimated power – 1,835 hp (1,368 kW) shaft power + 485 lbf (2.16 kN) residual thrust at 15,000 rpm
RDa.7 Mk 21
2,099 hp (1,565 kW) estimated power - used for Bréguet 1050 Alizé
RDa.7/2 Mk.529
2,100 hp (1,600 kW) estimated power – 1,910 hp (1,420 kW) shaft power + 495 lbf (2.20 kN) residual thrust at 15,000 rpm
RDa.10
2,555 hp (1,905 kW) estimated power – 2,305 hp (1,719 kW) shaft power + 670 lbf (3.0 kN) residual thrust at 15,000 rpm
RDa.10/1
3,030 hp (2,260 kW) estimated power – 2,750 hp (2,050 kW) shaft power + 750 lbf (3.3 kN) residual thrust at 15,000 rpm
RDa.10/1
3,245 hp (2,420 kW) estimated power at 15,000 rpm, with Water/Methanol injection for the Hawker-Siddeley HS.748MF Andover C Mk.1.
RDa.11
Mk.506
(RDa.3)
Mk.510
(RDa.6)
Mk.511
(RDa.6)
Mk.512
(RDa.6)
Mk.514
(RDa.6)
Mk.520
(RDa.7)
Mk.525
(RDa.7/1)
Mk.526
(RDa.7/2)
Mk.527
(RDa.7/2)
Mk.528
(RDa.7/2)
Mk.529
(RDa.7/2)
Mk.530
(RDa.7/2)
Mk.531
(RDa.7/2)
Mk.551
(RDa.7)
Mk.552
(RDa-7)
Mk.540
(RDa.10)
Mk.541
(RDa.11)
Mk.542
(RDa.10/1)

== Applications ==
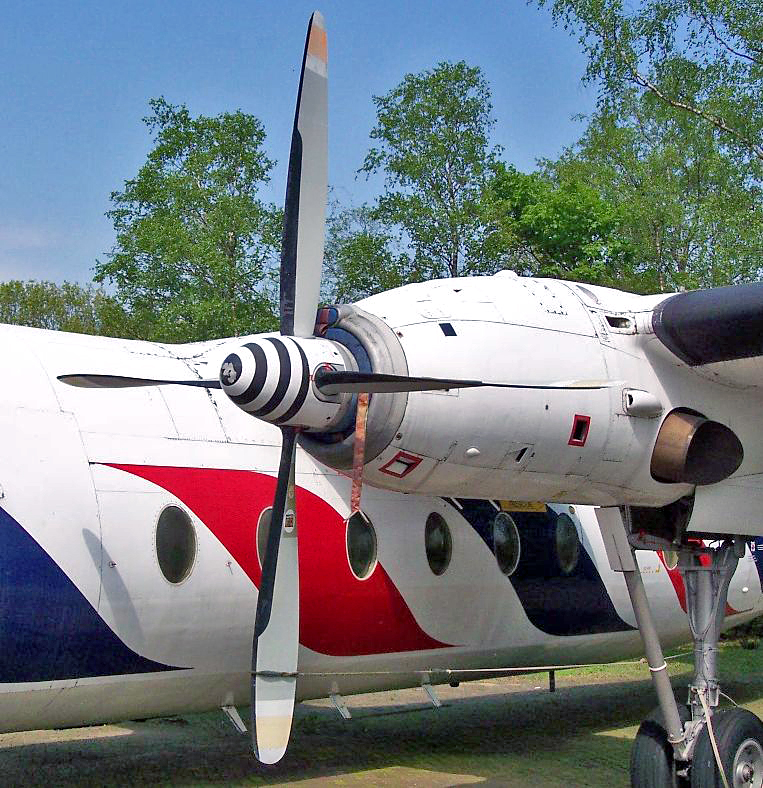
A Rolls-Royce Dart mounted on a Fokker F27 Friendship

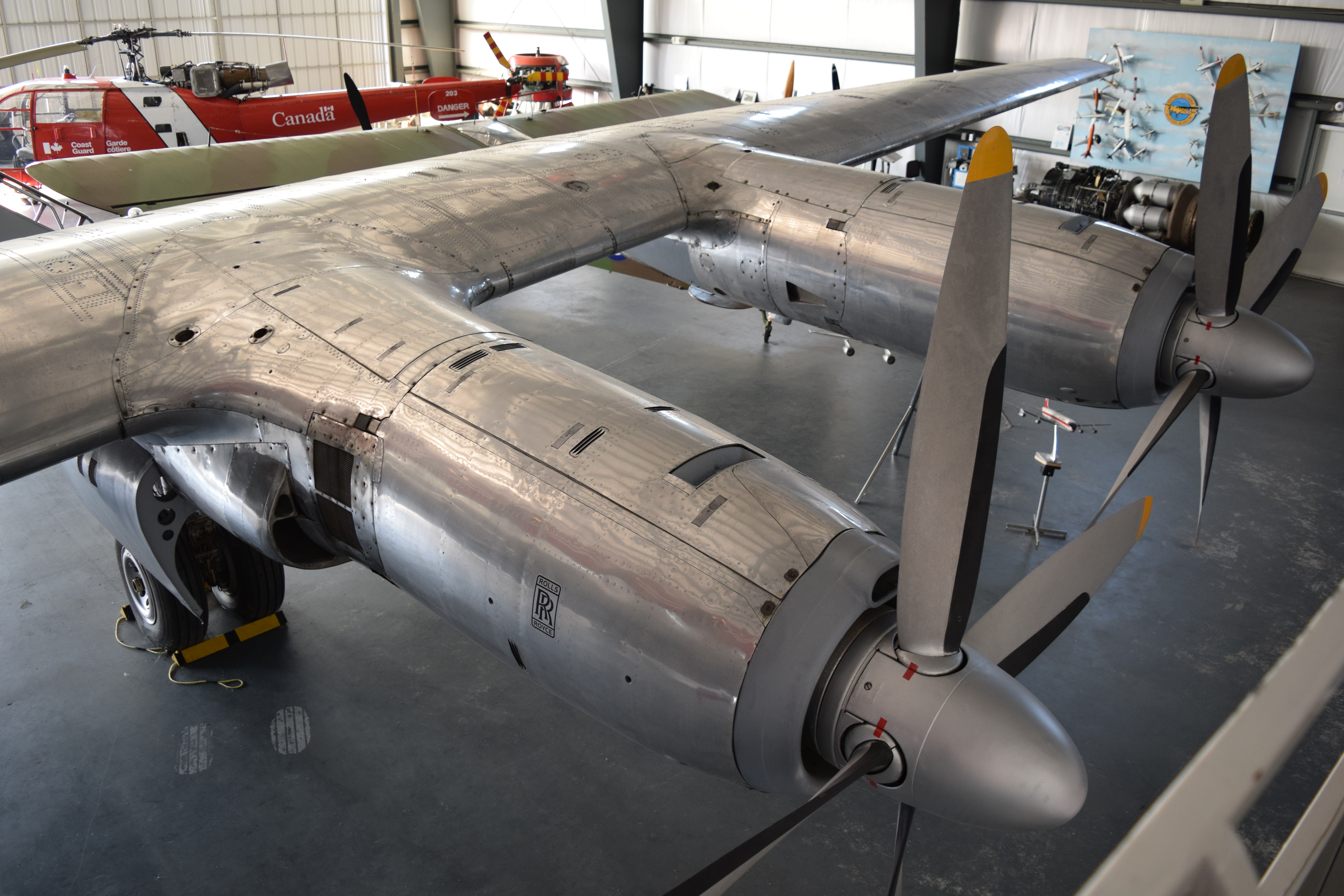
Rolls-Royce Darts on a Vickers Viscount

Largely associated with the very successful Vickers Viscount medium-range airliner, it powered a number of other European and Japanese designs of the 1950s and 60s and was also used to convert American-manufactured piston aircraft to turboprop power. The list includes:

- Armstrong Whitworth AW.660 Argosy : Medium-range transport
- Aviation Traders Accountant : Cancelled prototype airliner
- Avro 748 (Hawker Siddeley H.S. 748) : Feeder airliner.
- Avro Athena one prototype aircraft only : Military trainer
- Breguet Alizé : Anti-submarine aircraft: Dart RDa 21 2099 hp with water/methanol injection
- Cavalier Turbo Mustang III
- Fairchild F-27 : Small airliner, U.S. manufactured version of the Fokker F27 Friendship. Two versions: F27A and F27B
- Fairchild Hiller FH-227 : Airliner, U.S. manufactured version of the Fairchild F-27 featuring a stretched fuselage with increased passenger seating
- Fokker F27 Friendship : Small airliner from Dutch aerospace and aviation manufacturer Fokker. The original model on which several other airliners were based (such as the abovementioned F-27 and FH-227).
- Grumman Gulfstream I (G-159) : Executive transport & small airliner. Includes the stretched Grumman Gulfstream I-C (G-159C).
- Handley Page Dart Herald : Small airliner
- Hawker Siddeley Andover : Military transport
- NAMC YS-11 : Short/medium range airliner (Japanese aircraft)
- Some Douglas DC-3 transport aircraft have been upgraded to use Darts. DC-3s in BEA service with this update were called Pionairs. Another conversion is the Conroy Turbo Three.
- Convair 600 and Convair 640 converted from Convair 240, Convair 340 and Convair 440 piston-powered aircraft: Small airliners
- Boeing B-17F Flying Fortress : A unique one was converted by Aero-Flite Company with 4x Rolls-Royce Dart turboprop engines and was used for fire fighting.

Power output was around 1,500 hp (1,120 kW) in early versions, and close to twice that in later versions, such as those that powered the NAMC YS-11 airliner. Some versions of the engine were fitted with water methanol injection, which boosted power in hot and high altitude conditions.

== Engines on display ==
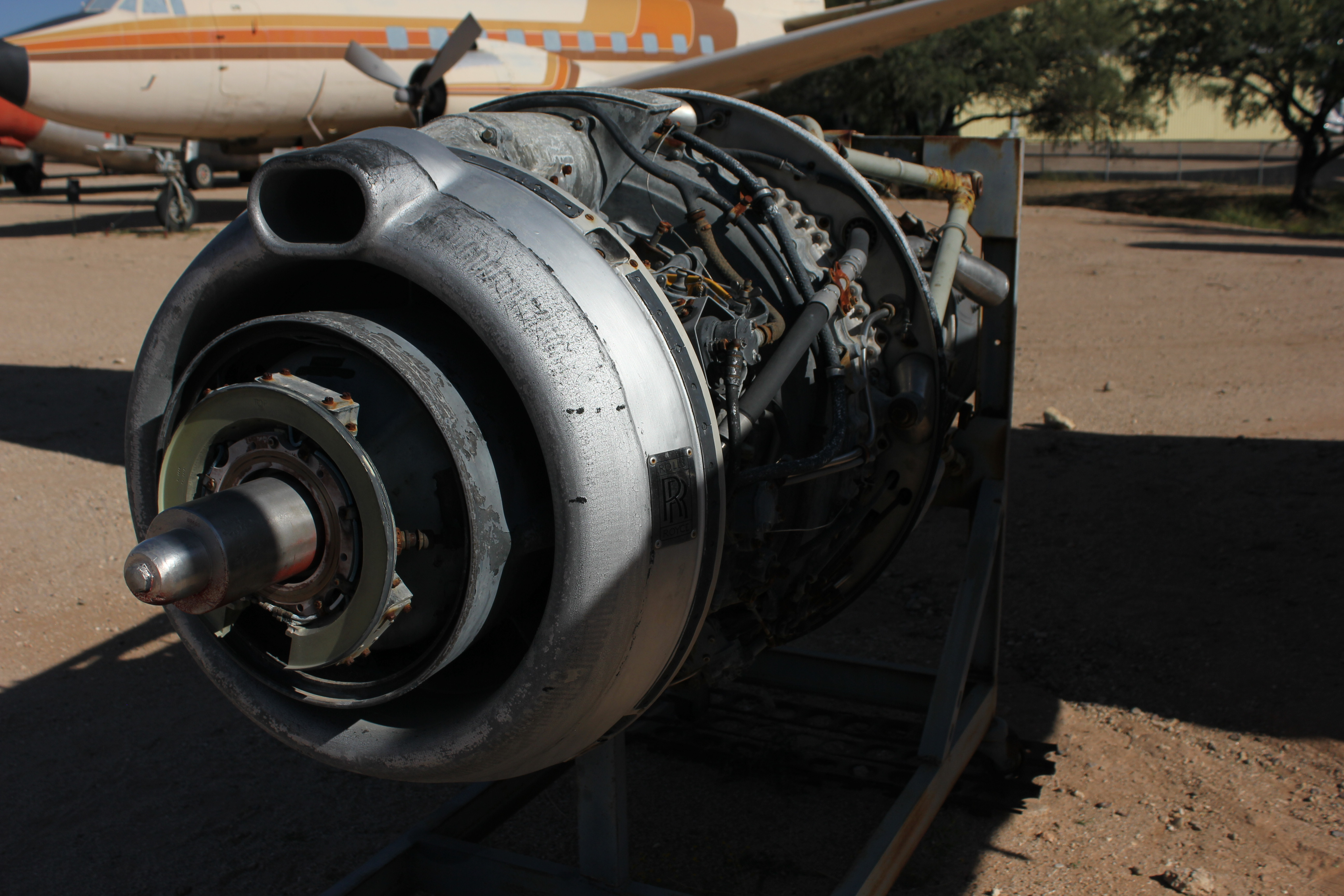
Rolls Royce Dart Engine on Display at the Pima Air and Space Museum in Tucson, Arizona

- A Rolls-Royce Dart working module cutaway is on public display at the Trenchard Museum RAF Halton, Halton, Buckinghamshire.
- A Rolls-Royce Dart is on public display at the Royal Air Force Museum Cosford.
- A Rolls-Royce Dart is on display at the Rolls-Royce Heritage Trust (Derby).
- A Rolls-Royce Dart is on public display at the Gatwick Aviation Museum.
- A Rolls-Royce Dart is on public display at the National Air and Space Museum.
- A Rolls-Royce Dart is on public display at Canadian Museum of Flight.
- A Rolls-Royce Dart is on public display at the Australian National Aviation Museum.
- A Rolls-Royce Dart is on public display at the Aviation Heritage Museum (Western Australia).
- A Rolls-Royce Dart is on display at Brooklyn Technical High School
- A Rolls-Royce Dart RDa.7 is on public display at the City of Norwich Aviation Museum in Horsham St Faith, Norfolk.
- A Rolls-Royce Dart is on public display at the Civil Aviation Trust Museum in Staplecross, East Sussex.

== Specifications (Dart RDa.7) ==
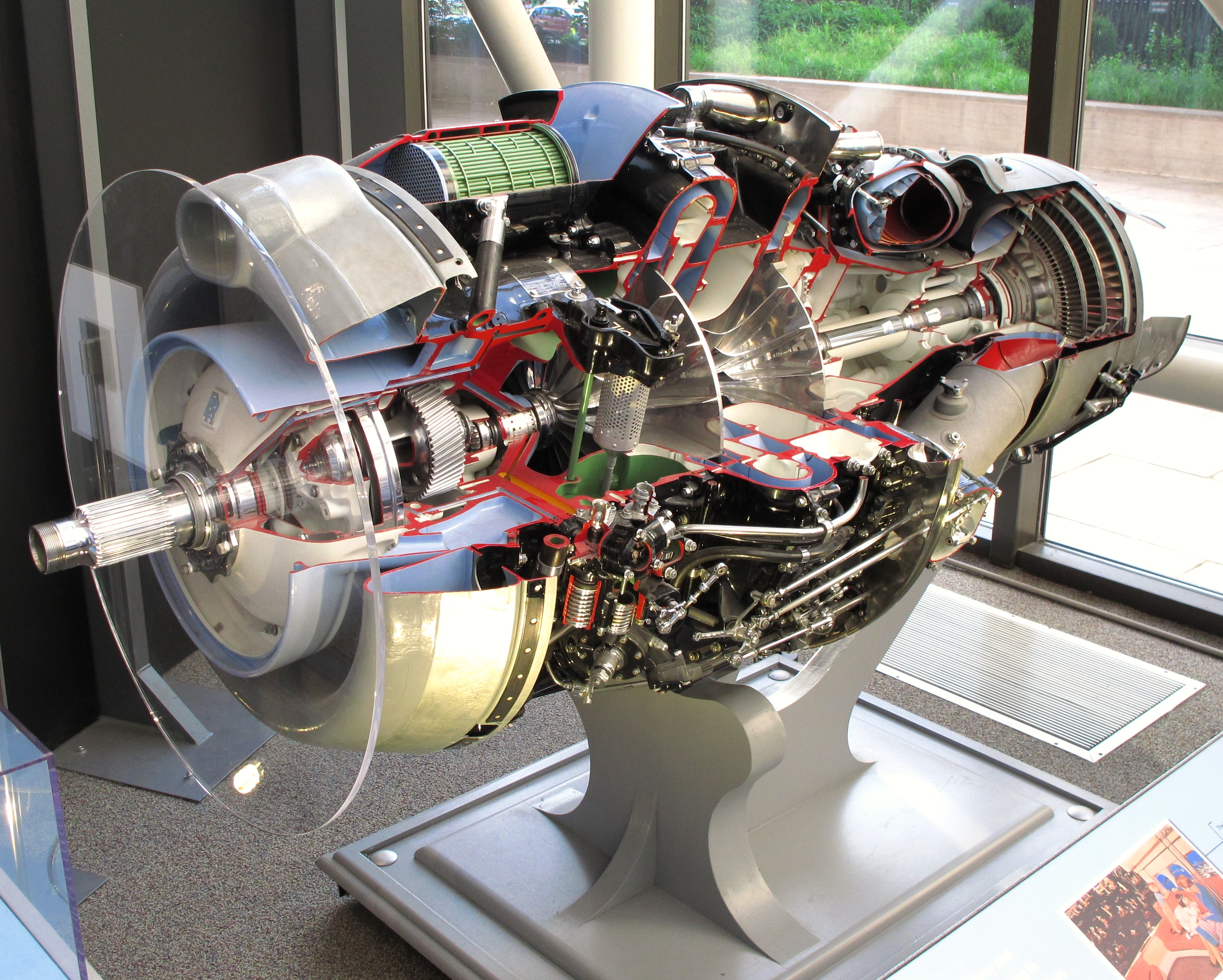
Rolls-Royce Dart Turboprop engine, cut-away display

Data from Jane's All The World's Aircraft 1965–66.

==== General characteristics ====
- Type: Turboprop
- Length: 97.6 in (2,480 mm)
- Diameter: 37.9 in (960 mm)
- Dry weight: 1,207 lb (547 kg) (dry)

==== Components ====
- Compressor: Two-stage centrifugal compressor
- Combustors: 7 straight-flow combustion chambers with ignitors in No 3 and 7 chambers
- Turbine: 3-stage axial turbine
- Fuel type: Kerosene
- Oil system: Self contained, 25 pint (14 L) capacity oil tank

==== Performance ====
- Maximum power output: 1,815 ehp (1,354 kW) (1,630 shp (1,220 kW)) at 15,000 rpm
- Overall pressure ratio: 5.62:1
- Air mass flow: 23.5 lb/s (10.66 kg/s)
- Specific fuel consumption: 0.581 lb/(ehp hr)
- Power-to-weight ratio: 1.35 shp/lb (2.48 kW/kg)

== See also ==
Comparable engines

- Armstrong Siddeley Mamba
- General Electric T58
- Lycoming T53
- Napier Eland

Related lists

- List of aircraft engines
