= EFW N-20 =

Swiss jet fighter aircraft

N-20 Aiguillon
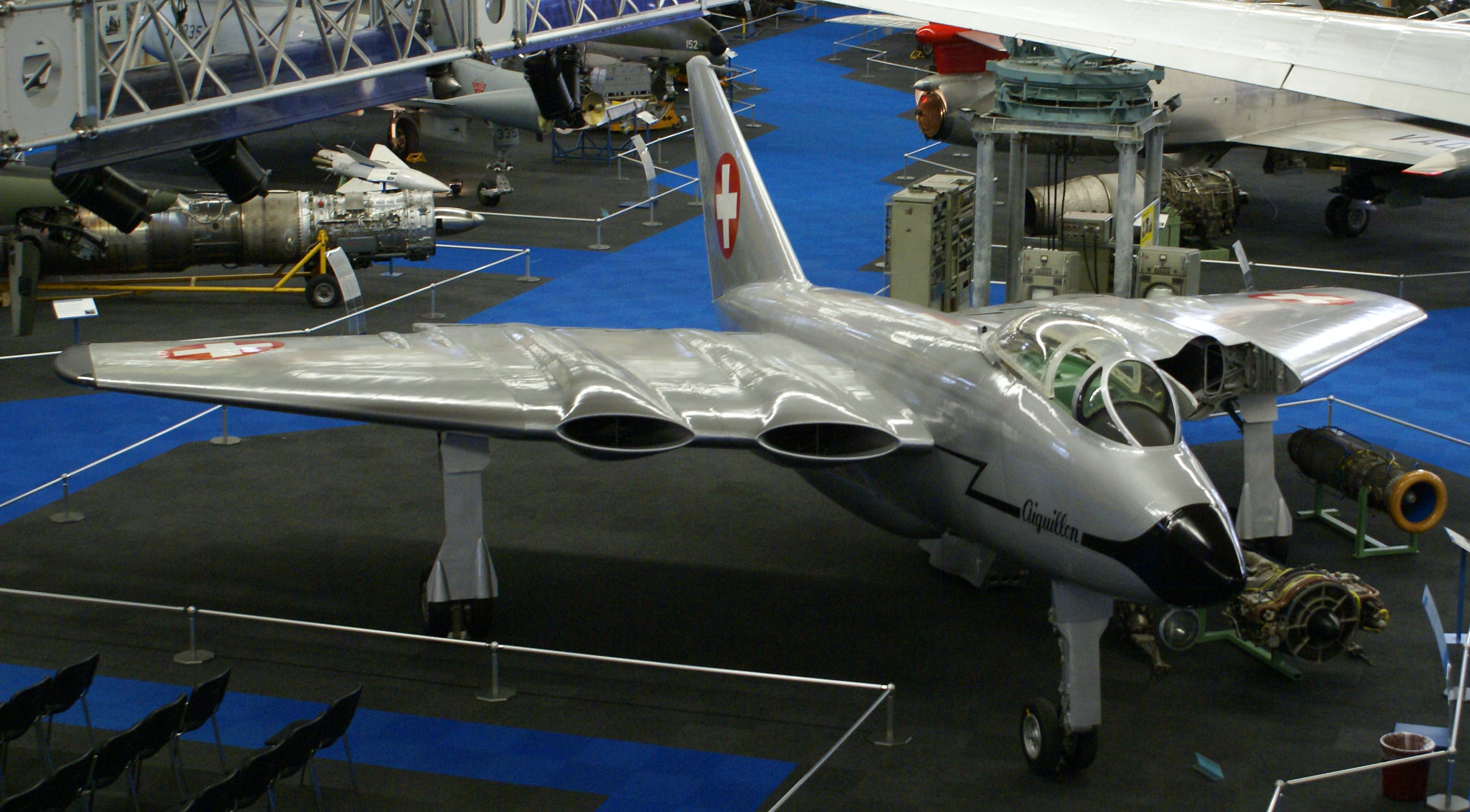
- The N-20.10 Aiguillon

General information
- Type: Fighter aircraft
- National origin: Switzerland
- Manufacturer: Eidgenössische Flugzeugwerke Emmen
- Status: Cancelled
- Primary user: Swiss Air Force
- Number built: 1

History
- First flight: 8 April 1952

The EFW N-20 Aiguillon (in English: "Stinger") was Switzerland's first indigenous jet fighter project. The Swiss Federal Aircraft Factory developed a design for a four-engined swept winged fighter following the end of the Second World War. An unpowered sub-scale N-20.01 glider and a turbojet powered test aircraft, also sub-scale and known as the N-20.02 Arbalète ("Crossbow"), were test flown. A fighter prototype N-20.10 Aiguillon was built but never flown, and a twin-engines N.20.20 Harpon was also proposed but not followed up.

The Arbalète and Aiguillon are on public display at the Flieger Flab Museum, Dübendorf.

== Design and development ==
The aircraft was to be powered by four turbofan engines buried in the wings, with the bypass air feeding cold-air tunnels each side of the engines including a combustion chamber where additional thrust could be gained. The bypass air could be deflected though large slots on the upper and lower wings to act as aerodynamic flaps or thrust reversers. Two engines could be shut down in flight to increase range. It was planned that the N-20 would carry its armament in a detachable weapons bay, capable of carrying large loads of cannons, rockets or bombs.

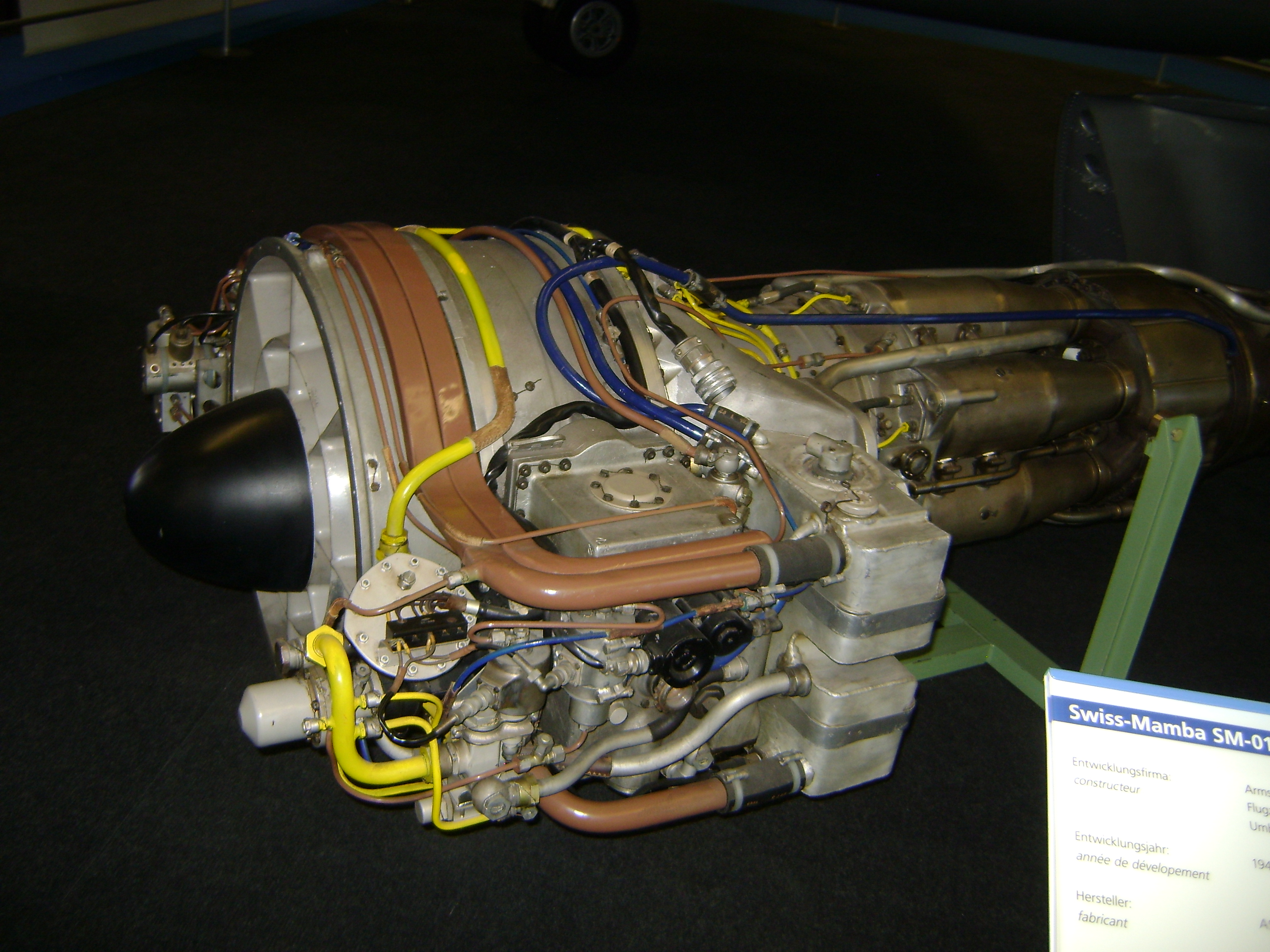
SM-1 engine on display

It was initially planned that the aircraft's engines would be designed and built in Switzerland by Sulzer. Sulzer only built a turbojet though, the Sulzer D-45, with a thrust of 7.38 kN (1,660 lbf). Of these engines, D-45.01 was used in a test rig between 1950 and 1951 and the second engine, D-45.04 (of limited airworthiness) was used until 1955 in a test rig. The D45.04 is part of the Dübendorf museum N-20 display. For the development of the bypass-engine DZ-45 Sulzer expected a development contract worth 10 million swiss francs that never materialized.

Aerospace engineer Theodore von Kármán who worked on the similar Vought Cutlass when invited by F+W Emmen for the N-20 project suggested a vertical stablizer for the aircraft.

The Armstrong Siddeley Mamba turboprop was then chosen as the basis for the N-20's prototype engines, with the propeller reduction gear replaced by a low pressure compressor. This powerplant was named Swiss Mamba SM-1; the conversion was carried out in 1948 by EFW, with only six engines built (four fitted to the N-20 with two spares). One of the spare engines is today part of the Swiss Museum of Transport, at the Flieger-Flab-Museum Dübendorf. Flight tests of the engine began in October 1952 under a De Havilland Mosquito. The proposed development into the SM-5 for the production aircraft was very similar to the DZ-45 proposed by Sulzer in 1947.

=== EFW N-20.01 ===
Since Swiss industry still had no experience with the aircraft and aerodynamics of jet aircraft, several wind tunnel models were produced. In addition, a 3/5th scale wooden glider, the EFW N-20.01 was built to allow testing of the novel wing shape; this flew on 17 April 1948. The aircraft was equipped with a JATO solid rocket motor, which was able to be started independently to reach the necessary altitude for tests. The nose gear came from a de Havilland Vampire and the main landing gear from a Messerschmitt Bf 109; both were electromechanical retractable. The body was made from wood and fabric covered. The N-20.01 was destroyed in a landing accident on 1 July 1949 at Emmen air force base.

=== EFW N-20.02 Arbalète ===
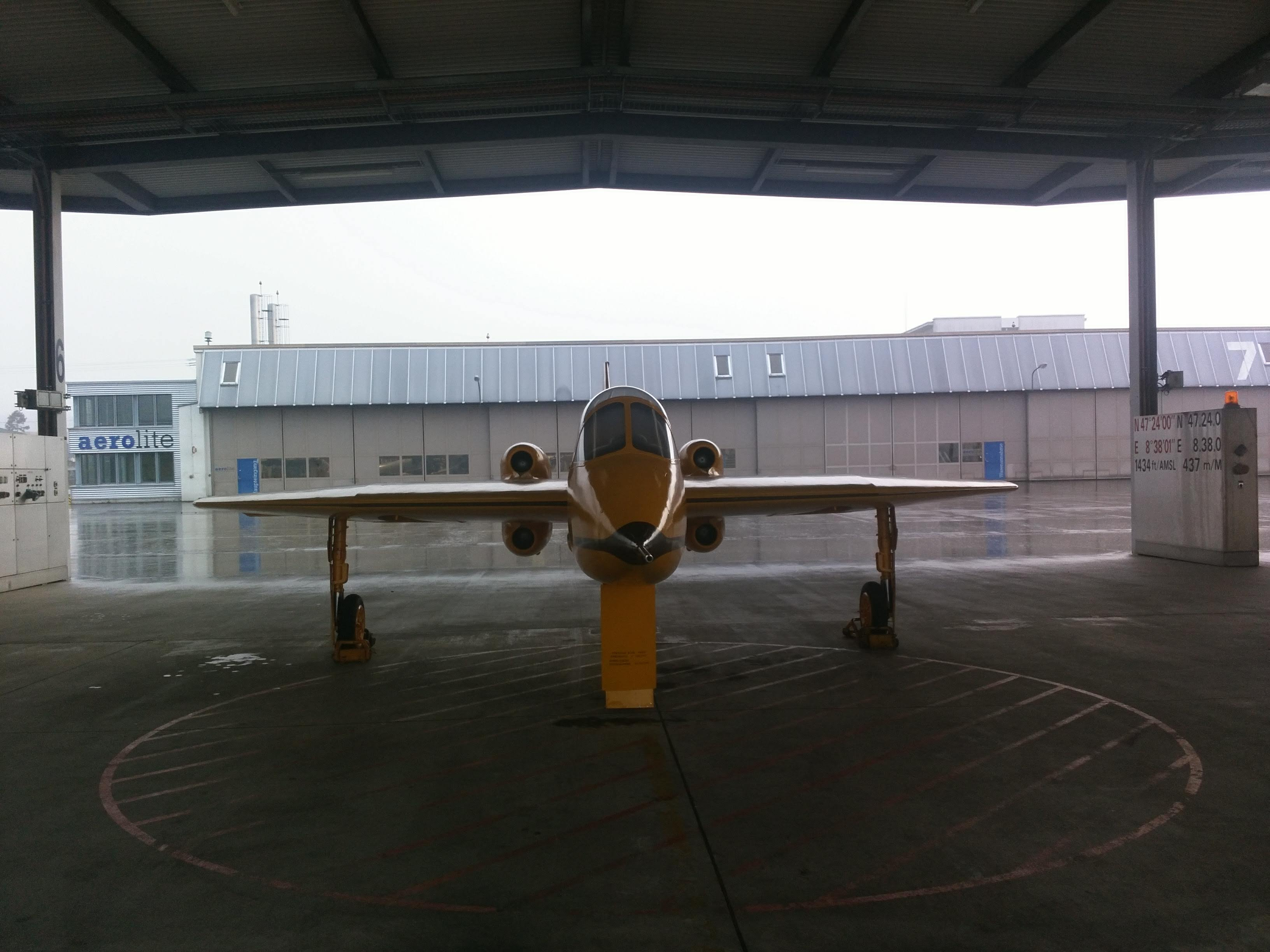
N-20.02 Arbalète on display

The glider had successfully proven the design and was followed by a similar sized powered test aircraft, the EFW N-20.02 Arbalète ("Crossbow"), powered by four 0.98 kN (220 lbf) Turboméca Piméné turbojets mounted above and below the wings. This aircraft first flew on 16 November 1951. It proved to have good manoeuvrability and reached a maximum speed of 750 km/h (466 mph).

=== EFW N-20.10 Aiguillon ===
The full scale aircraft was estimated to have a maximum speed of 1,095 km/h (680 mph), but the initial converted Mamba, the SM-1, which was test-flown under a de Havilland Mosquito in 1948 and was the first turbofan to fly, did not generate adequate thrust. Considerable further work was required for the definitive two-shaft SM-5 engine, which was meant to generate 14.7 kN (3,300 lbf) thrust. The prototype was completed in 1952 and, fitted with four SM-1 engines, flew briefly during a taxi test on 8 April 1952 but development of the engine and the N-20 aircraft was cancelled soon afterwards.

=== EFW N-20.20 Harpon ===
During testing it was discovered that the engines would not produce the required thrust, so the N-20.20 project was started. The aircraft was similar to the N-20.10, but had one conventional engine, a Rolls-Royce Avon or Armstrong Siddeley Sapphire turbojet in each wing root. The wing was a little thinner and the main landing gear came a little closer to the fuselage because now there was no need to place the engines within the wing. The N 20:20 was never completed, although some wind tunnel models were manufactured.

== Specifications (N-20.10 Aiguillon) ==
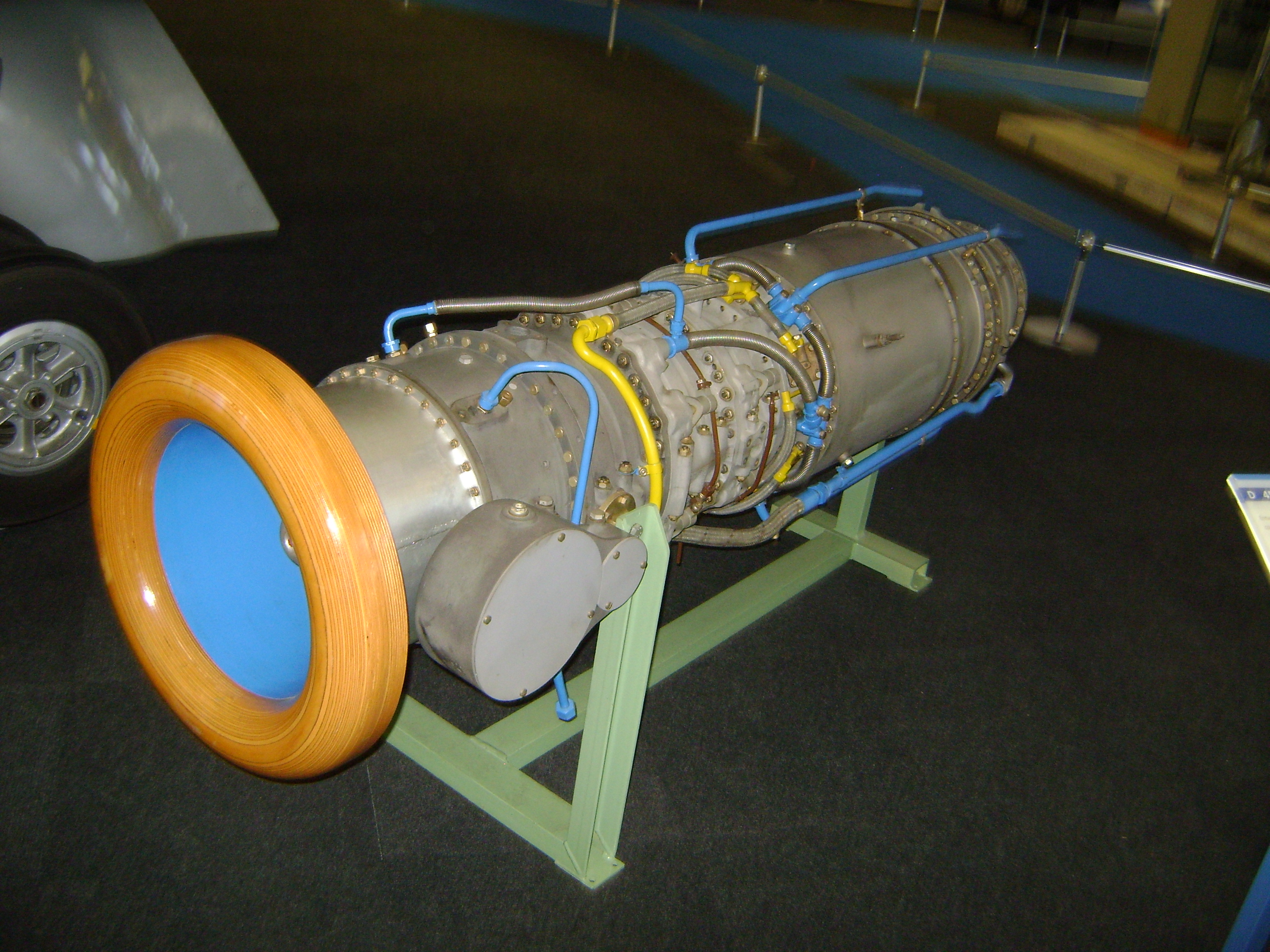
Sulzer D45.04 engine

Data from The Swiss N-20 Jet Fighter Bomber.

General characteristics

- Crew: 1
- Length: 12.5 m (41 ft 0 in)
- Wingspan: 12.6 m (41 ft 4 in)
- Height: 3.13 m (12 ft 0 in)
- Wing area: 54 m^{2} (570 sq ft)
- Empty weight: 9,000 kg (19,842 lb)
- Gross weight: 8,709 kg (19,200 lb)
- Powerplant: 4 × Sulzer Swiss Mamba turbofan, 6.2 kN (1,400 lbf) thrust each

Performance

- Maximum speed: 1,000 km/h (620 mph, 540 kn)
- Range: 500 km (310 mi, 270 nmi)
- Service ceiling: 11,000 m (36,000 ft)

== See also ==
Aircraft of comparable role, configuration, and era

- Douglas F4D Skyray
- Vought F7U Cutlass

Related lists

- List of tailless aircraft
- List of fighter aircraft

== Bibliography ==
- Buttler, Tony and Jean-Louis Delezenne. X-Planes of Europe: Secret Research Aircraft from the Golden Age 1946-1974. Manchester, UK: Hikoki Publications, 2012. ISBN 978-1-902-10921-3
- Haller, Ullrich. "The Swiss N-20 Jet Fighter-Bomber". Air Pictorial, July 1964. pp. 203–4.
- Munziger, Ernst. Düsentriebwerke. Luzern: Baden Verlag, 1991. ISBN 3-85545-056-0.
- Schürmann, Roman. Helvetische Jäger. Dramen und Skandale am Militärhimmel. Zürich: Rotpunktverlag, 2009. ISBN 978-3-85869-406-5
