= Saab 210 =

Saab experimental aircraft

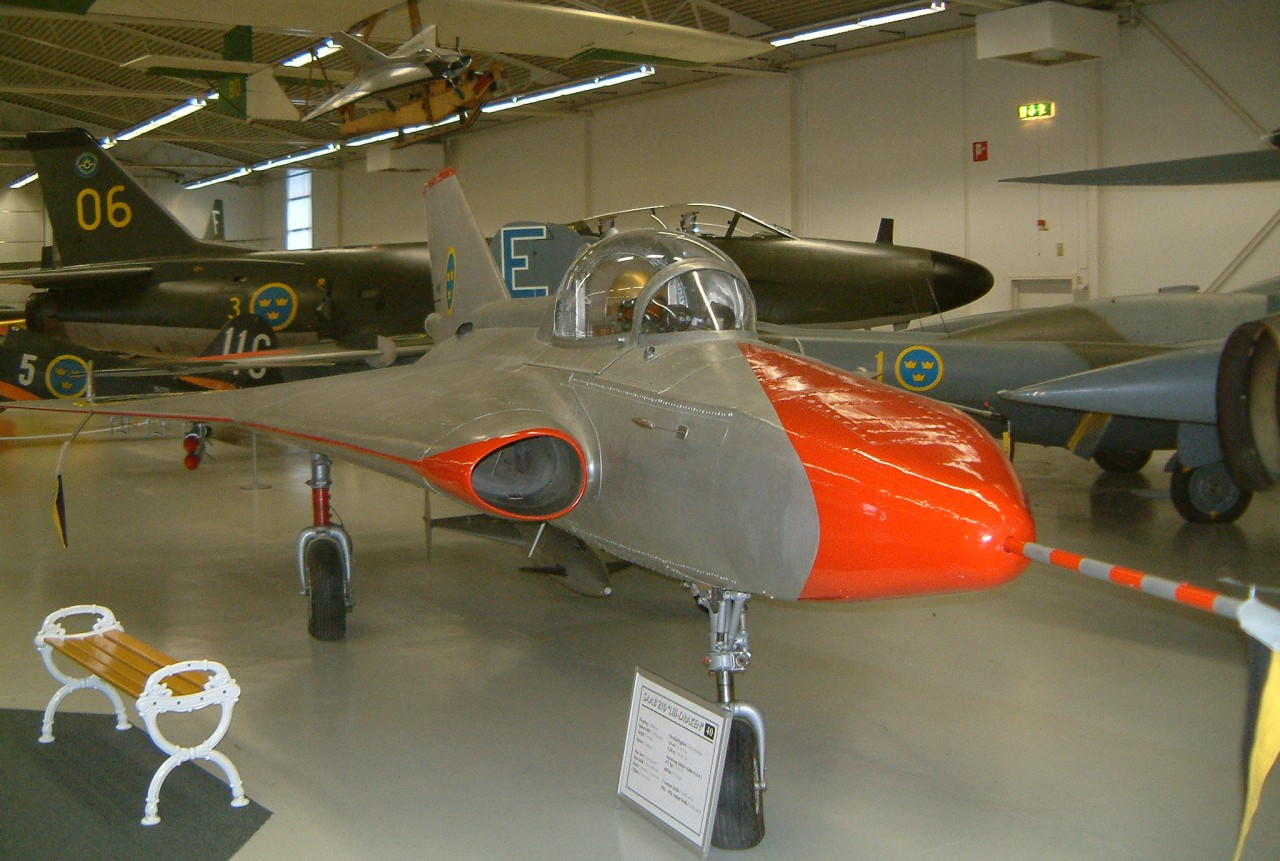
- Saab 210B on display at the Flygvapenmuseum (Air Force Museum)

General information
- Type: Experimental aircraft
- National origin: Sweden
- Manufacturer: Saab AB
- Number built: 1

History
- First flight: 21 January 1952
- Developed into: Saab 35 Draken

The Saab 210 is an approximately 70% scale research prototype for the double-delta configuration of the Saab 35 Draken supersonic fighter. It became known by the unofficial nickname Lilldraken (Little Dragon or Little Kite). Its first flight was on 21 January 1952.

== Naming ==
The 210 retrospectively gained the unofficial name Lilldraken from the larger Type 35 Draken which it led to. The Swedish word "Draken" has a double meaning, translating either as "The Dragon" or "The Kite". It is said that the name was derived from the appearance of the prototype Type 35, like a paper kite, when seen from above.

== Design and development ==
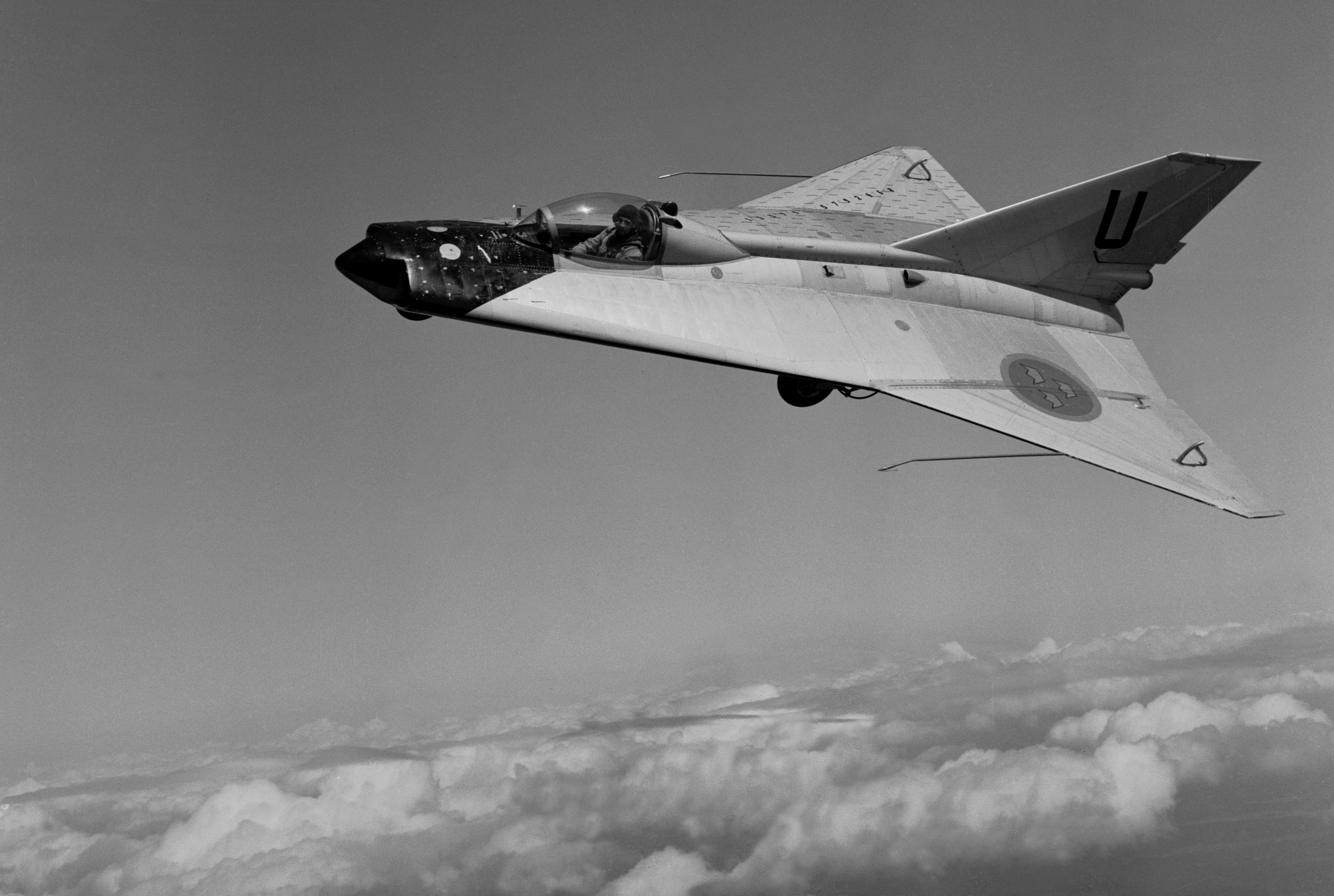
Saab 210 (Saab 210A), the original configuration

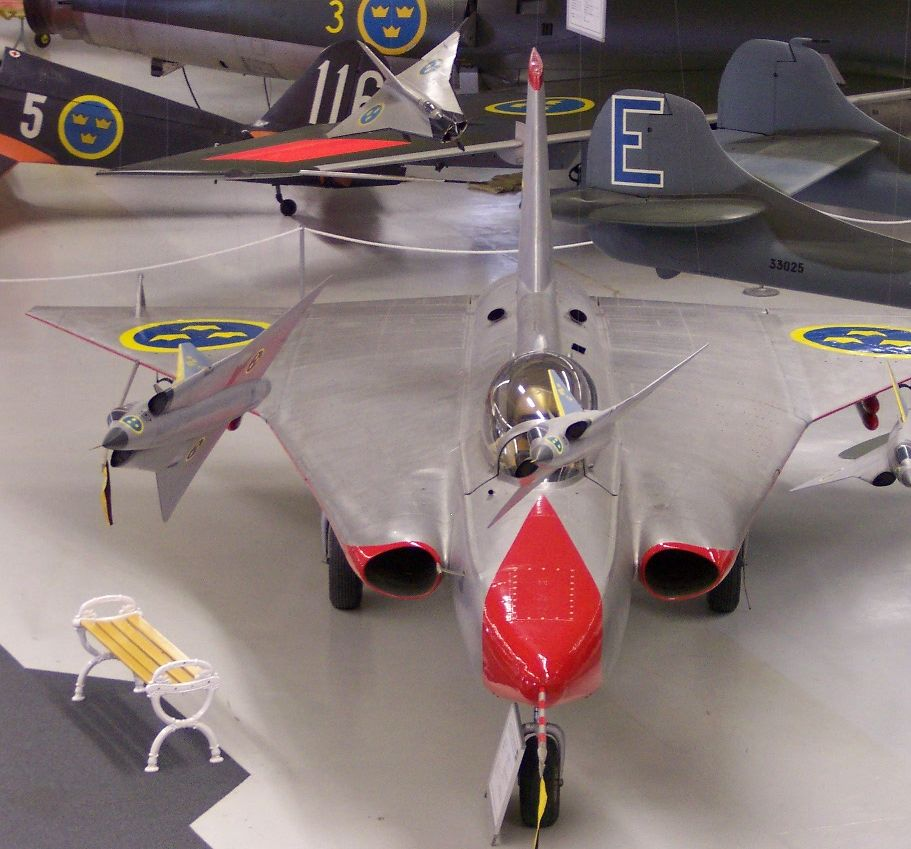
Saab 210B, the later configuration

Under designer Erik Bratt, in the early 1950s Saab were developing a double-delta configuration for a proposed supersonic jet fighter. The configuration was novel and highly advanced, so a small aerodynamic test aircraft, the Type 210, was built to investigate its low-speed flight characteristics.

=== 210 or 210A ===
The tailless double-delta wing extended almost to the front of the 210, with the integral wing root air intakes positioned just behind a small nose. The 210 also featured a protruding bubble canopy, a swept tail fin and semi-retractable tricycle undercarriage. By now the fighter was designated the J 35 Draken and the diminutive test aircraft soon became known as the "Lilldraken". Jet power was provided by a 1,000 lb class Armstrong Siddeley Adder engine.

The 210 was taken up for its maiden flight by Bengt Olow, on 21 January 1952. It subsequently undertook extensive flight testing, before undergoing modification for a second phase.

=== 210B ===
The 210 was modified, with the air intakes moved back to positions alongside the cockpit, in order to increase the field of view for the pilot. A drogue parachute was also added. In this form it was designated the 210B, and the previous configuration retrospectively as the 210A.

Flight testing resumed, and by the time of its last flight on 25 October 1955, the Saab 210 in both its forms had undertaken 887 separate sorties.

The Saab 210B is currently on display in the Flygvapenmuseum (Air Force Museum) in Linköping.

== Specifications ==
Data from Taylor 1976, p. 205

General characteristics

- Crew: 1
- Length: 6.1 m (20 ft 0 in) +
- Wingspan: 4.88 m (16 ft 0 in) ~
- Powerplant: 1 × Armstrong Siddeley Adder turbojet engine, 4.67 kN (1,050 lbf) thrust

Performance

- Maximum speed: 644 km/h (400 mph, 348 kn)

== See also ==
Related development

- Saab 35 Draken

Aircraft of comparable role, configuration, and era

- Boulton Paul P.111
- Convair XF-92

Related lists

- List of experimental aircraft
- List of military aircraft of Sweden
