= Avro Athena =

1948 British military trainer aircraft

Athena
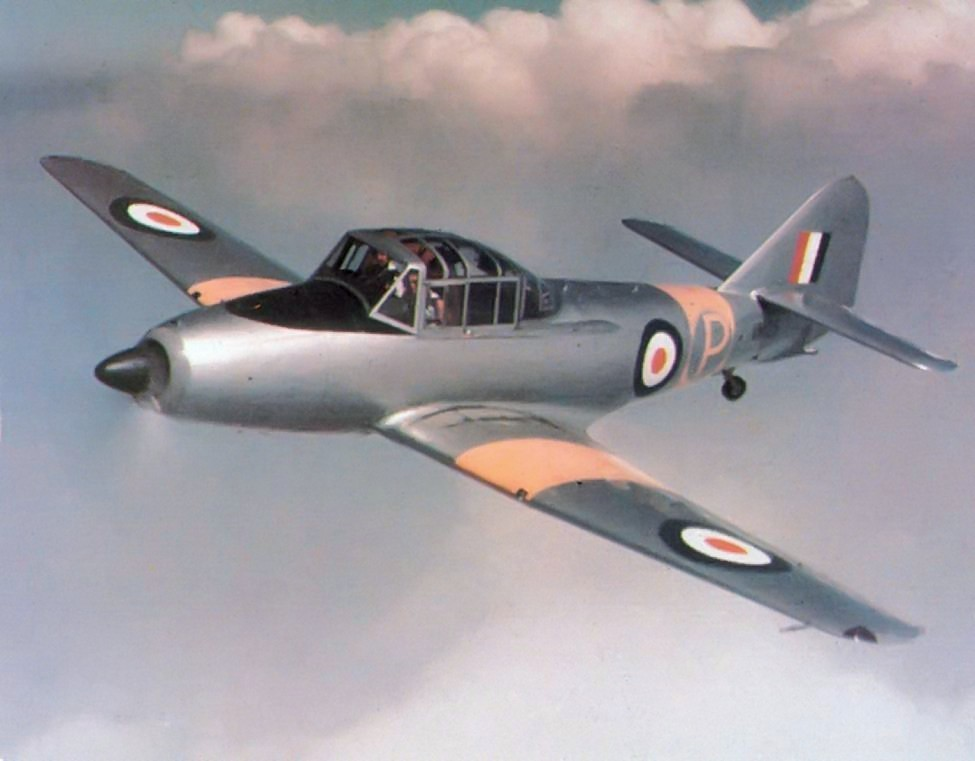
- Avro Athena T.1 prototype with turboprop engine

General information
- Type: Trainer
- Manufacturer: Avro
- Primary user: Royal Air Force
- Number built: 22 (including prototypes)

History
- Introduction date: 1950
- First flight: 12 June 1948

The Avro 701 Athena is a British advanced trainer aircraft built by Avro in the late 1940s. It was designed to replace the North American Harvard in the Royal Air Force, but was bought only in small numbers, the competing Boulton Paul Balliol being preferred.

== Design and development ==
The Athena was designed to meet the requirements of Air Ministry Specification T.7/45 for a three-seat advanced trainer powered by a turboprop engine for the RAF. The Athena was an all-metal low-winged monoplane, with a side-by-side cockpit. The Air Ministry rethought its requirements in 1947 and replaced the original specification with Specification T.14/47, which specified the use of a Rolls-Royce Merlin 35 piston engine, large stocks of which were held in store.

Despite the change in specification, the first three prototypes were of the turboprop-powered Athena T.1, the first of which, powered by an Armstrong Siddeley Mamba engine, flew on 12 June 1948 at Woodford Aerodrome. The Merlin-powered Athena T.2 first flew on 1 August 1948, and was evaluated against the similar Boulton Paul Balliol.

A small production run of 15 Athenas was ordered for the RAF, but the Balliol was preferred, and no further Athenas were ordered.

== Operational history ==
The 15 production Athenas were used by the RAF from 1950 for armament training at the RAF Flying College at RAF Manby. A single aircraft was loaned back to Avro and given the civil registration G-ALWA for a demonstration tour of India. No sales resulted and it was returned to the RAF.

== Variants ==
Athena T.Mk.1
Turboprop-powered prototype. One 1,010 hp (750 kW) Armstrong Siddeley ASM.3 Mamba engine. Two built.
Athena T.Mk.1A
Single prototype powered by 1,400 hp (1,000 kW) Rolls-Royce RDa.1 Dart engine. Second prototype to fly.
Athena T.Mk.2
Trainer to Spec. T.14/47 powered by 1,280 hp (950 kW) Rolls-Royce Merlin 35. Four prototypes plus 15 production.

== Operators ==
United Kingdom

- Royal Air Force
  - Aircraft Instrument Experimental Unit, Martlesham Heath (one T2 in 1951)
  - Central Flying School, Little Rissington (two T2s 1949-1950)
  - Empire Test Pilot's School, Farnborough (one T2 development aircraft)
  - Royal Aircraft Establishment (two aircraft)
  - RAF College at Manby (ten aircraft 1950-1955)

== Accidents and incidents ==
Two of the 22 aircraft were lost in flying accidents:

- T2 VR569 of the Aircraft Instrument Experimental Unit was written off at Wilby, Suffolk on 27 June 1951. Aircraft broke up in spiral dive after loss of control in cloud, two crew killed.
- T2 VR570 crashed before delivery on 20 March 1950.

== Specifications (Athena T.2) ==
Data from Jane's all the World's Aircraft 1949-50, Avro aircraft since 1908, The Incomplete Guide to Airfoil Usage

General characteristics

- Crew: 2
- Capacity: 720 lb (330 kg)
- Length: 37 ft 4 in (11.37 m)
- Wingspan: 40 ft 0 in (12.2 m)
- Height: 12 ft 11 in (3.93 m) a/c level with tail up
- Wing area: 270 sq ft (25 m^{2})
- Aspect ratio: 5.93
- Airfoil: root: H/1414/37.5 (14%); tip: H/1410/37.5 (10%)
- Empty weight: 6,384 lb (2,896 kg)
- Gross weight: 8,130 lb (3,688 kg)
- Fuel capacity: 110 imp gal (130 US gal; 500 L) in two flexible wing tanks and 30 imp gal (36 US gal; 140 L) in a fuselage collector tank, with provision for 90 imp gal (110 US gal; 410 L) in two under-wing drop tanks; Oil: 15 imp gal (18 US gal; 68 L)
- Powerplant: 1 × Rolls-Royce Merlin 35 V-12 liquid-cooled piston engine, 1,280 hp (950 kW) for take-off

1,245 hp (928 kW) combat rating at 11,500 ft (3,500 m)
1,060 hp (790 kW) continuous cruise at 9,250 ft (2,820 m)

- Propellers: 4-bladed constant-speed propeller

Performance

- Maximum speed: 293 mph (472 km/h, 255 kn) at 20,000 ft (6,100 m)
- Cruise speed: 223 mph (359 km/h, 194 kn) max at 10,000 ft (3,000 m)
- Stall speed: 81 mph (130 km/h, 70 kn) flaps down
- Range: 550 mi (890 km, 480 nmi)
- Service ceiling: 29,000 ft (8,800 m) service ceiling
- Rate of climb: 2,050 ft/min (10.4 m/s) initial; 2,030 ft/min (10.3 m/s) at 10,000 ft (3,000 m)
- Wing loading: 30.1 lb/sq ft (147 kg/m^{2})
- Power/mass: 6.4 lb/hp (3.9 kg/kW)
- Take-off run to clear 50 ft (15 m): 745 yd (681 m) off concrete; 770 yd (700 m) off grass
- Landing run over 50 ft (15 m): 740 yd (680 m) on concrete; 710 yd (650 m) on grass

Armament

- Guns: 1x 0.303 in (7.70 mm) Browning machine gun
- Rockets: Provision for two 60 lb (27 kg) RP-3 rockets

== See also ==
Aircraft of comparable role, configuration, and era

- Boulton Paul Balliol

Related lists

- List of aircraft of the Royal Air Force
