= Armstrong Siddeley Mamba =

1940s British turboprop aircraft engine

Mamba
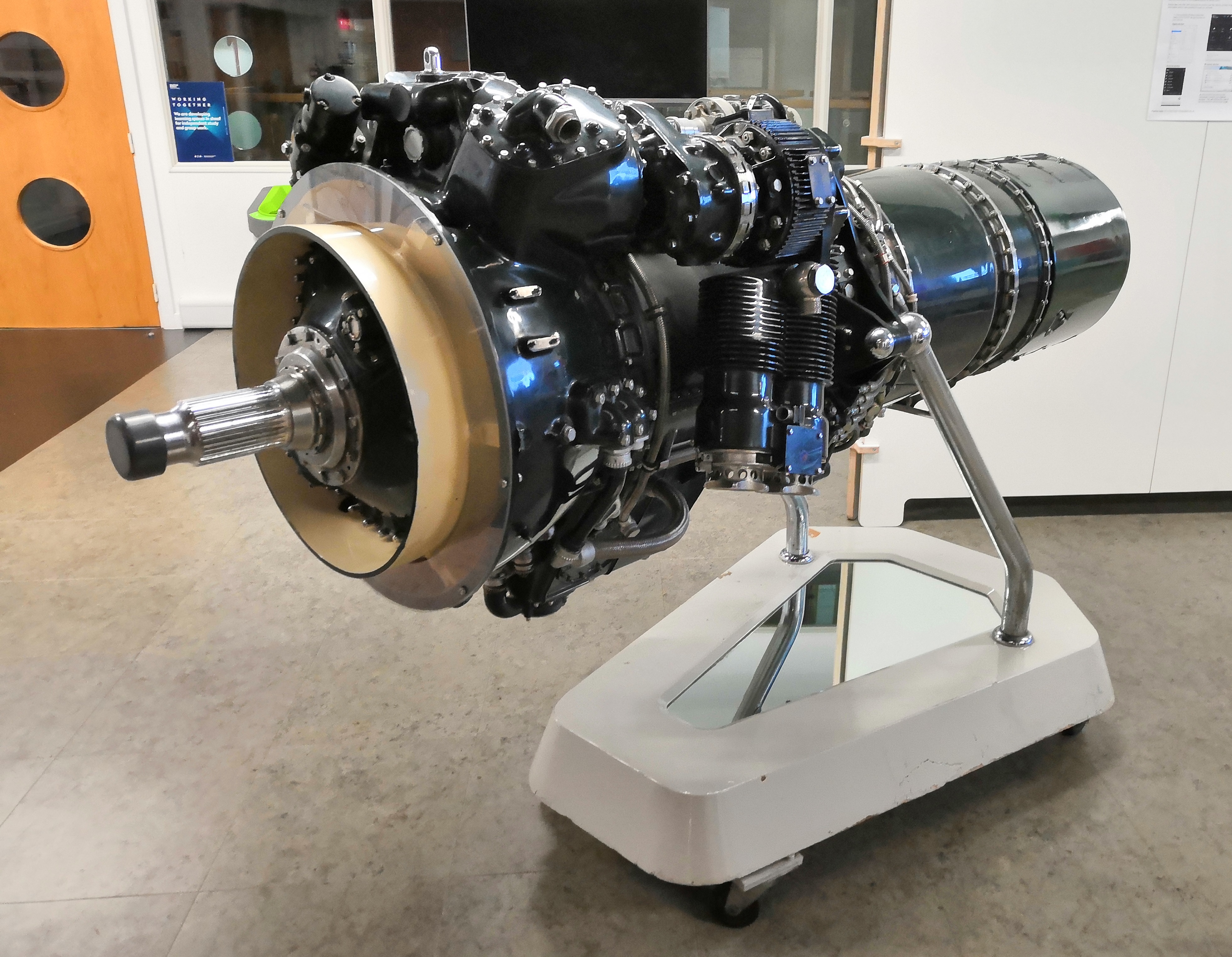
- Mamba engine on display at Sheffield Hallam University
- Type: Turboprop
- National origin: United Kingdom
- Manufacturer: Armstrong Siddeley
- First run: April 1946
- Major applications: Boulton Paul Balliol; A.W. Apollo; Short Seamew
- Developed into: Armstrong Siddeley Double Mamba; Armstrong Siddeley Adder

The Armstrong Siddeley Mamba was a British turboprop engine produced by Armstrong Siddeley in the late 1940s and 1950s, producing around 1,500 effective horsepower (1,100 kW).

Armstrong Siddeley gas turbine engines were named after snakes.

== Design and development ==
The Mamba was a compact engine with a 10-stage axial compressor, six combustion chambers and a two-stage power turbine. The epicyclic reduction gearbox was incorporated in the propeller spinner. Engine starting was by cartridge. The Ministry of Supply designation was ASMa (Armstrong Siddeley Mamba). The ASMa.3 gave 1,475 ehp and the ASMa.6 was rated at 1,770 ehp. A 500-hour test was undertaken in 1948 and the Mamba was the first turboprop engine to power the Douglas DC-3, when in 1949, a Dakota testbed was converted to take two Mambas.

The Mamba was also developed into the form of the Double Mamba, which was used to power the Fairey Gannet anti-submarine aircraft for the Royal Navy. This was essentially two Mambas lying side-by-side and driving contra-rotating propellers separately through a common gearbox.

A turbojet version of the Mamba was developed as the Armstrong Siddeley Adder, by removing the reduction gearbox.

== Variants and applications ==
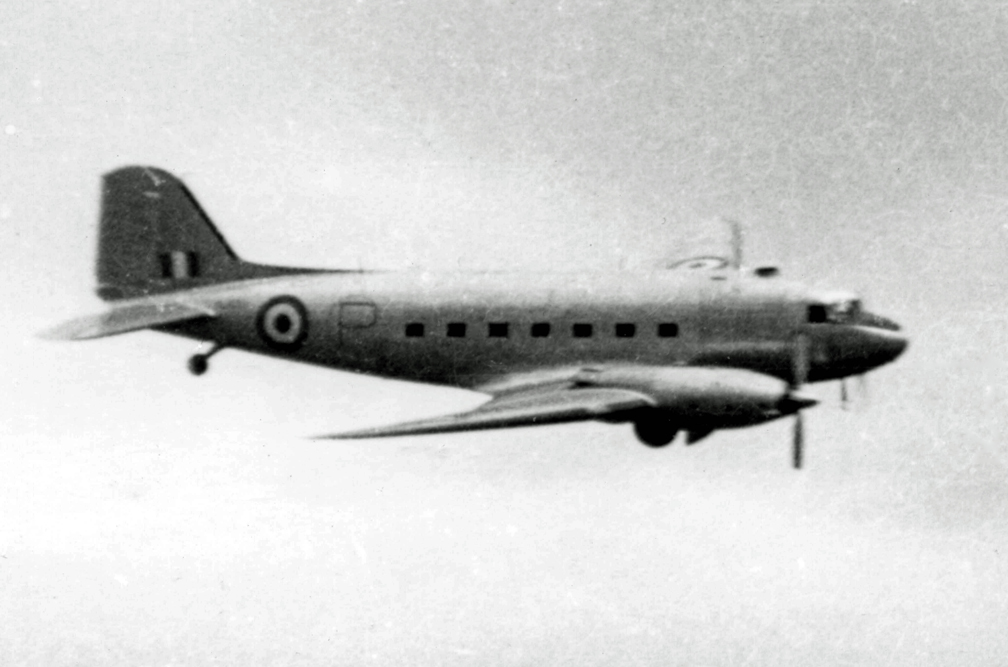
The Armstrong Siddeley Mamba-powered Douglas C-47B Dakota testbed in 1954 showing the slim outline of the Mambas

ASMa.3 Mamba
Armstrong Whitworth Apollo
Avro Athena
Boulton Paul Balliol
Breguet Br 971 (turboprop proposal)
Breguet Vultur
Miles M.69 Marathon II
Douglas C-47 Dakota
Short SB.3
ASMa.5 Mamba
Development engine for Armstrong Siddeley ASMD.3 Double Mamba
ASMa.6 Mamba
Short Seamew
ASMa.7 Mamba
A version for civil applications
Swiss-Mamba SM-1 (aft turbofan variant)
EFW N-20
Mamba 112
(ASMa.6)

== Engines on display ==
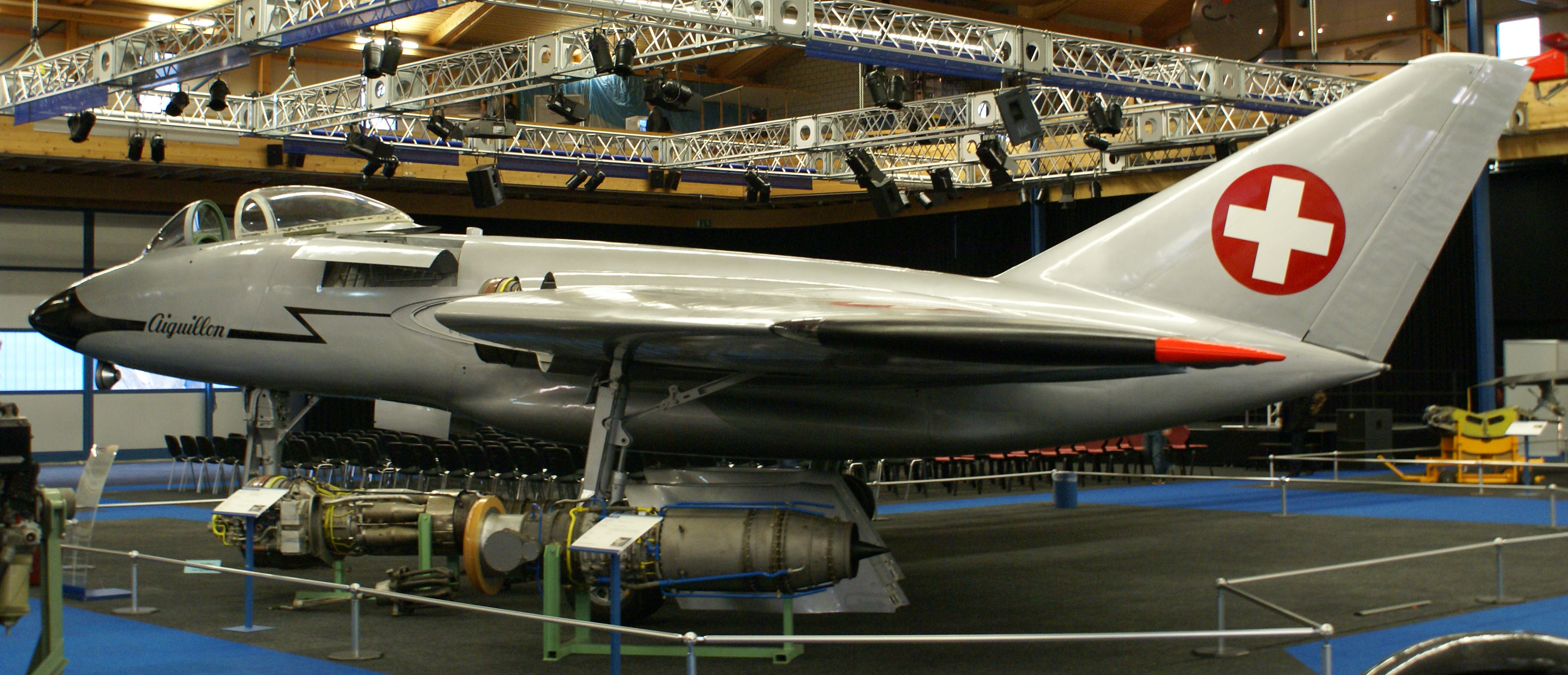
A Swiss-Mamba SM-1 on display next to an EFW N-20 fighter jet

Surviving Mambas are on display in the UK at the Midland Air Museum, Coventry Airport, Warwickshire and the East Midlands Aeropark. Another example is to be found at the Hertha Ayrton STEM Centre at Sheffield Hallam University, UK and a Mamba Mk 110 (serial number 654606 - ZP3043, believed originally flown in a Short Seamew) is on loan from the Rolls-Royce Heritage Trust to the Museum of Berkshire Aviation at Woodley, near Reading, Berkshire.

A Mamba working module cutaway is on public display at the Trenchard Museum, RAF Halton, Halton, Buckinghamshire.

Overseas, a Swiss-Mamba SM-1 is displayed at the Flieger-Flab-Museum Dübendorf in Switzerland and another Mamba can be seen at the Aviation Heritage Museum (Western Australia).

== Specifications (ASMa.6) ==
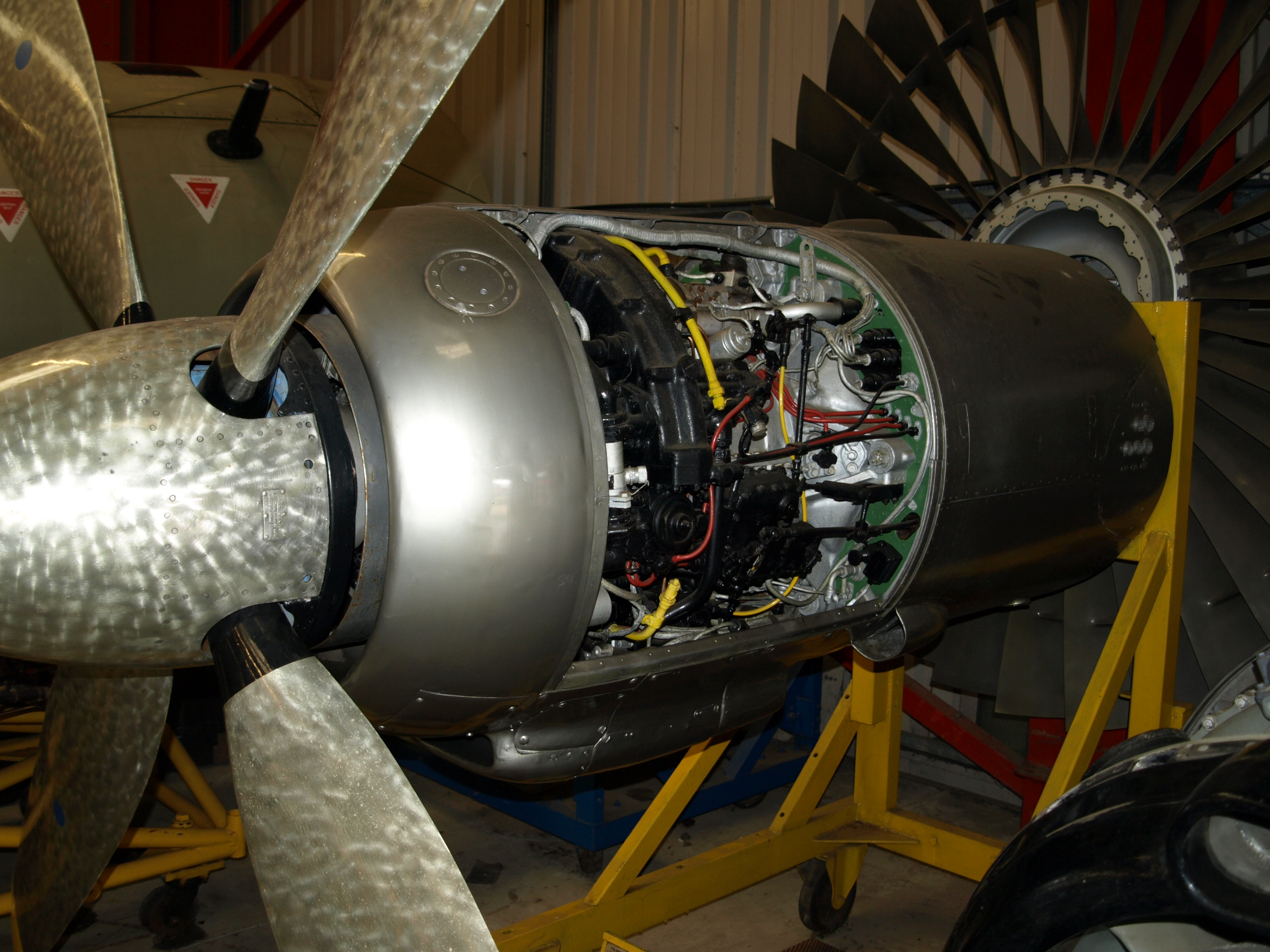
Mamba and propeller from the Apollo airliner

Data from Aircraft engines of the World 1957

==== General characteristics ====
- Type: Turboprop
- Length: 90.2 in (2,290 mm)
- Diameter: 33 in (840 mm)
- Frontal area: 5.9 sq ft (0.55 m^{2})
- Dry weight: 850 lb (390 kg)

==== Components ====
- Compressor: 11 stage axial flow
- Combustors: Annular combustion chamber with 24 vapourising burners
- Turbine: 3 stage axial flow
- Fuel type: Aviation Kerosene / JP-4

==== Performance ====
- Maximum power output: 1,650 shp (1,230 kW) plus 320 lbf (1.4 kN) thrust; 1,770 shp (1,320 kW) (equivalent) at 15,000 rpm
- Overall pressure ratio: 6:1
- Air mass flow: 21.5 lb/s (9.8 kg/s) at 15,000 rpm
- Specific fuel consumption: 0.69 lb/(hp⋅h) (0.42 kg/kWh) (equivalent shaft horsepower)
- Power-to-weight ratio: 2.08 hp/lb (3.42 kW/kg) (equivalent shaft horsepower)

== See also ==
Related development

- Armstrong Siddeley Double Mamba
- Armstrong Siddeley Adder

Related lists

- List of aircraft engines
