= Short-life engine =

Engine designed for a short operational lifespan

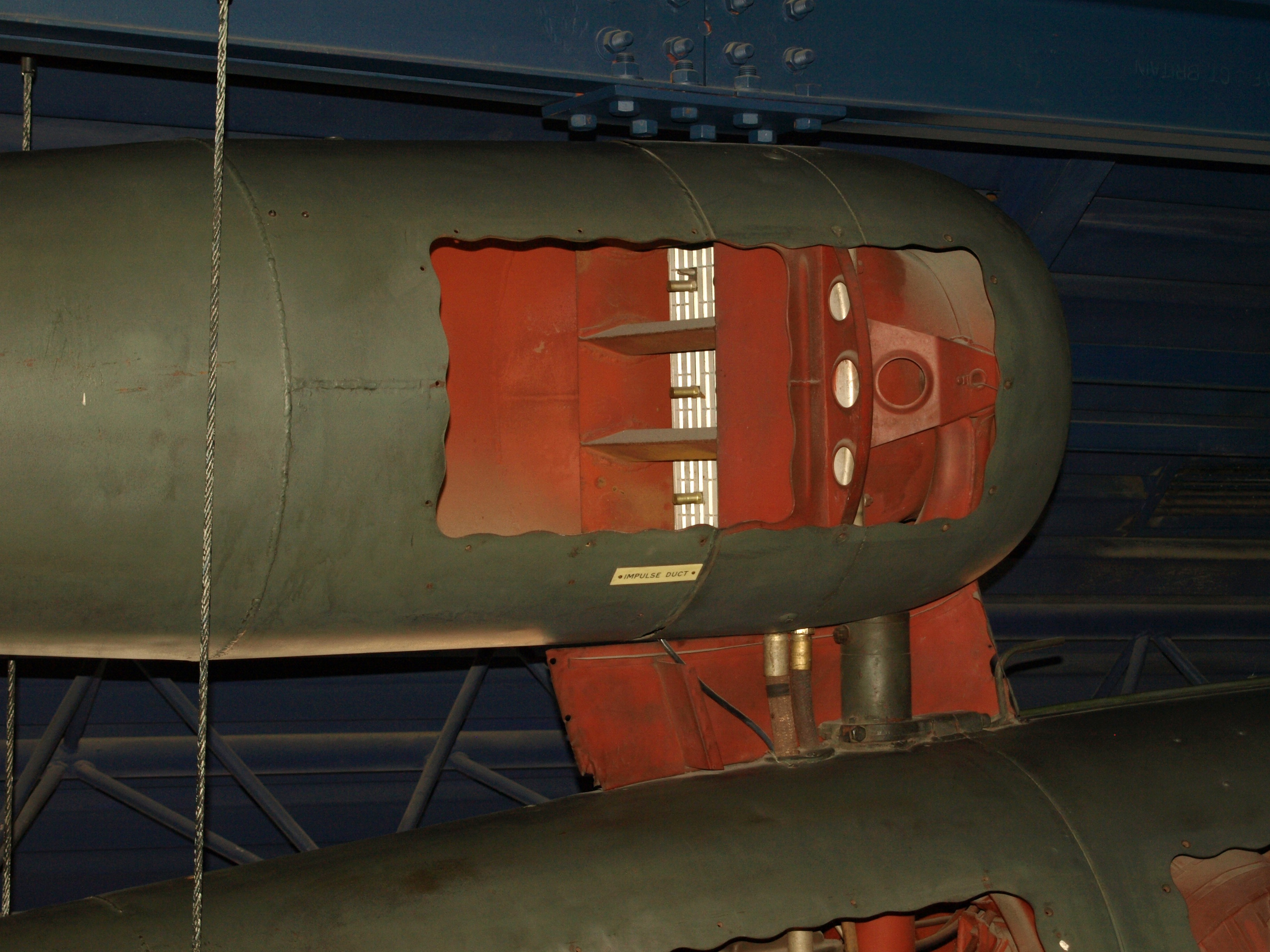
Cutout of an Argus As 014 pulsejet reveals its simple design

Short-life engines (also known as limited-life, expendable, or attritable engines) are a class of engines designed for unmanned aerial vehicles (UAVs), cruise missiles, and other guided weapons where the operational lifespan is significantly shorter than that of traditional manned vehicles. Unlike conventional "durable" (typically man-rated) engines designed to last for thousands of hours with regular maintenance, short-life engines prioritize a high thrust-to-weight ratio and design simplicity over long-term durability and fuel efficiency. While low production costs are usually emphasized, they might be less of a factor for some applications (e.g., strategic cruise missiles).

== Terminology ==
The terminology for these engines distinguishes between intended use cases, specifically between "attritable" and "expendable" systems.

- "Attritable" is a term of military jargon defining engines that are designed for "limited life" reuse (e.g., 10–20 missions or tens to hundreds of hours). They power "attritable" aircraft—systems that are low-cost enough that their combat loss is acceptable to commanders, yet robust enough to be reused if they survive. These engines represent a middle ground in engineering, requiring better durability than a missile engine but significantly lower cost than a manned fighter jet engine.
- "Expendable" engines are designed for a single mission with no expectation of recovery or reuse, such as in cruise missiles or decoy drones. Because they are not required to survive multiple thermal cycles, they may lack complex cooling systems and expensive superalloys, utilizing simple castings and welded shafts instead. Furthermore, because conventional liquid oil lubrication systems can account for a significant portion of an engine's weight and cost, expendable engines often simplify or eliminate them entirely in favor of alternative methods like vapor-phase lubrication.

There are no clear cut boundaries between "attritable" and "expendable" systems.

== History ==
The concept of the short-life engine emerged during World War II with the V-1 flying bomb, powered by the Argus As 014 pulsejet. As the first mass-produced disposable aero-engine, the Argus As 014 was manufactured from low-grade mild steel with a design life of approximately one hour, sufficient only to reach its target.

In the mid-1940s, the Fairchild Engine and Airplane Corporation began design studies for a small, expendable turbojet. Although the company was simultaneously developing turboprop concepts (like the never-produced XT46-R-2), it identified a specific market need for a low-cost, expendable engine suitable for guided missiles. Preliminary studies initiated in 1946 led to a U.S. Navy contract in June 1947 for an engine to power an air-to-underwater torpedo-carrying missile; this project resulted in the development of the Fairchild J44.

During the 1950s, the development of small gas turbine engines expanded across North America as several companies initiated dedicated programs. Seven manufacturers became significant players in this industry: CAE, Lycoming, General Electric, Williams International, Pratt & Whitney Canada, Allison, and Garrett. Additionally, Wright Aeronautical, Solar, and Dreher Engineering Company began limited engine development efforts during the same period.

During the Cold War, the development of cruise missiles in the 1970s (such as the Tomahawk) necessitated a new class of small, efficient turbofans (e.g., Williams F107). These engines required higher fuel efficiency than the V-1's pulsejet to achieve long ranges but retained the "expendable" zero-maintenance design philosophy.

In the 21st century, the aerospace industry reached an "inflection point" with the need for the rapid development of new combat drones. This shift created demand for "attritable" engines that bridge the gap between single-use missile engines and durable manned aircraft engines, with the former used as an analogue of "guinea pigs" for the latter.

== Design and manufacturing ==
With typical operational periods ranging from a few minutes to a few hours, and total design lifetimes typically measured in the tens of hours, designers can "stretch" technology further than is possible in man-rated engines; for example, expendable engines can operate at significantly higher temperatures than long-life engines using identical materials. To support these requirements, the engines might use unique lubrication systems and specialized starting systems.

Although expendable engines do not require overhaul capabilities, they are still subject to high reliability requirements. The development and qualification process differs from that of standard aircraft engines because the short design life prevents the accumulation of large numbers of test hours on a single unit. As a result, development programs may utilize a larger total number of engines for testing, and qualification procedures are often established specifically for each application rather than following a uniform standard. These programs also serve as a testbed for new materials, allowing fabrication and operational data to be gathered before the materials are adopted for man-rated applications.

== See also ==
- Jet engine
- Loitering munition

== Sources ==
- Harper, Jon (2022-02-09). "The Meanings of 'Attritable' and 'Expendable'". National Defense Magazine.
- Leyes, Richard A.; Fleming, William A. (1999). The History of North American Small Gas Turbine Aircraft Engines. AIAA. ISBN 978-1-56347-332-6.
- Mindling, George; Bolton, Robert (2008). U.S. Air Force Tactical Missiles, 1949–1969: The Pioneers. Lulu.com. ISBN 978-0-557-00029-6.
- Oelrich, I. C.; Weidhuner, Donald D.; Riddell, Frederick R. (July 1985). Small Turbine Technology Review (IDA Paper). Alexandria, VA: Institute for Defense Analyses. P-1840.
- Soybel, Jamison (2021). Designing a Make vs. Buy Strategy for Expendable and Attritable Aircraft Engine Development (PDF) (Master's thesis). Massachusetts Institute of Technology. hdl:1721.1/138967.
- Wagner, Matthew J.; Forster, Nelson H.; Van Treuren, Kenneth W.; Gerardi, David T. (1999). "Vapor Phase Lubrication for Expendable Gas Turbine Engines". Proceedings of the ASME 1999 International Gas Turbine and Aeroengine Congress and Exhibition. Vol. 1: Aircraft Engine, Marine, Turbomachinery, Microturbines and Small Turbomachinery. Indianapolis, Indiana: ASME. doi:10.1115/99-GT-028.
