= Merklin =

Merklin or Merklín may refer to:

== Places ==
- Merklín (Karlovy Vary District), a municipality and village in the Karlovy Vary Region
- Merklín (Plzeň-South District), a municipality and village in the Plzeň Region
  - Air battle over Merklín over the village

== People ==
- Joseph Merklin, French organ builder
