= Jaroslav Šrámek =

Czechoslovak pilot

Colonel Jaroslav Šrámek
- Born: 3 May 1929
- Died: 16 February 2015 (aged 85)
- Allegiance: Czechoslovakia
- Branch: Czechoslovak Air Force
- Service years: 1951–89
- Rank: Colonel
- Conflicts: Air battle over Merklín

Colonel Jaroslav Šrámek (3 May 1929 – 16 February 2015) was a fighter pilot, active during the Cold War. He was known as the only pilot from the Czechoslovak Air Force ever to have shot down an enemy jet-propelled plane. Šrámek flew more than 2,000 operational hours during his career, which spanned from 1951 to 1989.

== Biography ==
Šrámek had an interest in aviation from a young age, making model aircraft as a child. Entering high school, he attended the Czechoslovak Air Force Academy, a move which began his career in aviation. Later in his career, Šrámek became the first Czechoslovak to fly the MiG-23. He flew in the Czechoslovak Air Force until the 1980s, where he piloted MiG-23 aircraft. Šrámek described the MiG-23 as the best aircraft he had flown, because "it was the fastest". Šrámek ended his career with a total of 2,353 flight hours.

=== Air battle over Merklín ===
On 10 March 1953, Lt. Šrámek (5th Fighter Regiment, 2nd Squadron, Plzeň-Líně air base) had been flying close to the town of Domažlice in the west of Bohemia. His unit was assigned to patrol the edge of Czechoslovak airspace, close to the frontier with West Germany. Šrámek, who was flying a MiG-15, encountered two American F-84 Thunderjet planes above Merklín, a small village within Czechoslovak territory. The two American aircraft split and one escaped. The remaining craft was piloted by Lt. Warren G. A. Brown, a veteran of the Korean War. No missiles were fired; Šrámek fired two cannon shots. The American plane sustained two hits, with the second one, from the N-37 cannon, causing a fire to break out. Brown ejected from the aircraft, which crash-landed in German territory, near Falkenstein, Bavaria, approximately 35 kilometres (22 mi) from the border, and survived.
