= Aero L-29 Delfín =

1959 trainer aircraft family by Aero

L-29 Delfín
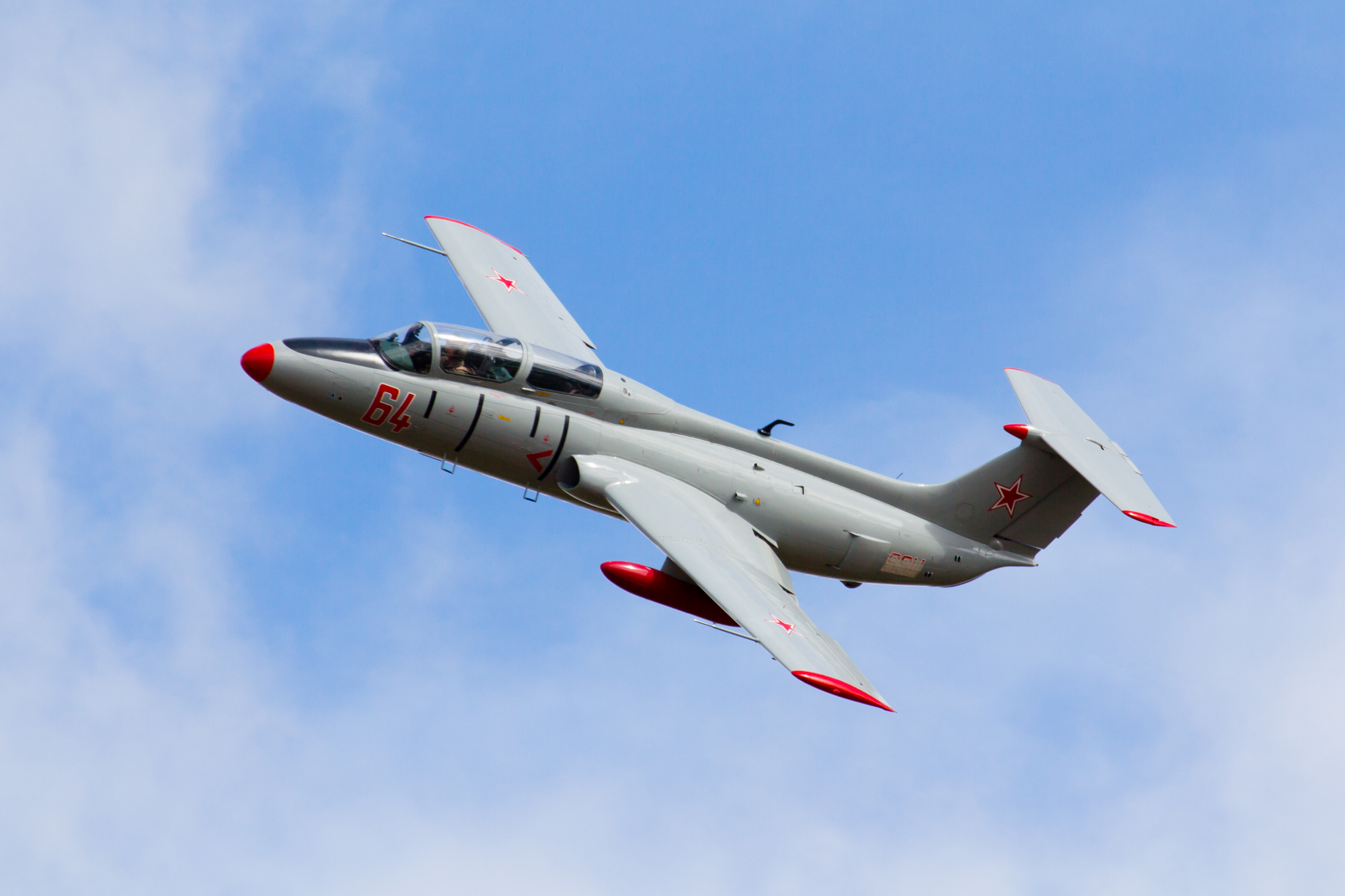
- Aero L-29 Delfín

General information
- Type: Military trainer aircraft Light attack
- Manufacturer: Aero Vodochody
- Designer: Ing. Zdeněk Rublič, Ing. Karel Tomáš and Ing. Jan Vlček
- Status: Limited service; popular civilian warbird
- Primary users: Soviet Air Force (historical) Czechoslovak Air Force (historical); Bulgarian Air Force (historical); Egyptian Air Force (historical)
- Number built: 3,665

History
- Manufactured: 1963–1974
- Introduction date: 1961
- First flight: 5 April 1959

The Aero L-29 Delfín (English: Dolphin, NATO reporting name: Maya) is a military jet trainer developed and manufactured by Czechoslovak aviation manufacturer Aero Vodochody. It is the country's first locally designed and constructed jet aircraft, and likely the biggest aircraft industrial programme to take place in any of the Council for Mutual Economic Assistance (COMECON) countries except the Soviet Union.

In response to a sizable requirement for a common jet-propelled trainer to be adopted across the diverse nations of the Eastern Bloc, Aero decided to embark upon their own design project with a view to suitably satisfying this demand. On 5 April 1959, an initial prototype, designated as the XL-29, performed its maiden flight. The L-29 was selected to become the standard trainer for the air forces of Warsaw Pact nations, for which it was delivered from the 1960s onwards. During the early 1970s, the type was succeeded in the principal trainer role by another Aero-built aircraft, the L-39 Albatros, heavily contributing to a decline in demand for the earlier L-29 and the end of its production during 1974.

During the course of the programme, in excess of 3,000 L-29 Delfín trainers were produced. Of these, around 2,000 were reported to have been delivered to the Soviet Union, where it was used as the standard trainer for the Soviet Air Force. Of the others, which included both armed and unarmed models, many aircraft were delivered to the various COMECON countries while others were exported to various overseas nations, including Egypt, Syria, Indonesia, Nigeria and Uganda. Reportedly, the L-29 has been used in active combat during several instances, perhaps the most high-profile being the use of Nigerian aircraft during the Nigerian Civil War of the late 1960s and of Egyptian L-29s against Israeli tanks during the brief Yom Kippur War of 1973. Limited use of the L-29 has continued following the end of the Cold War and into the 2020s.

== Development ==
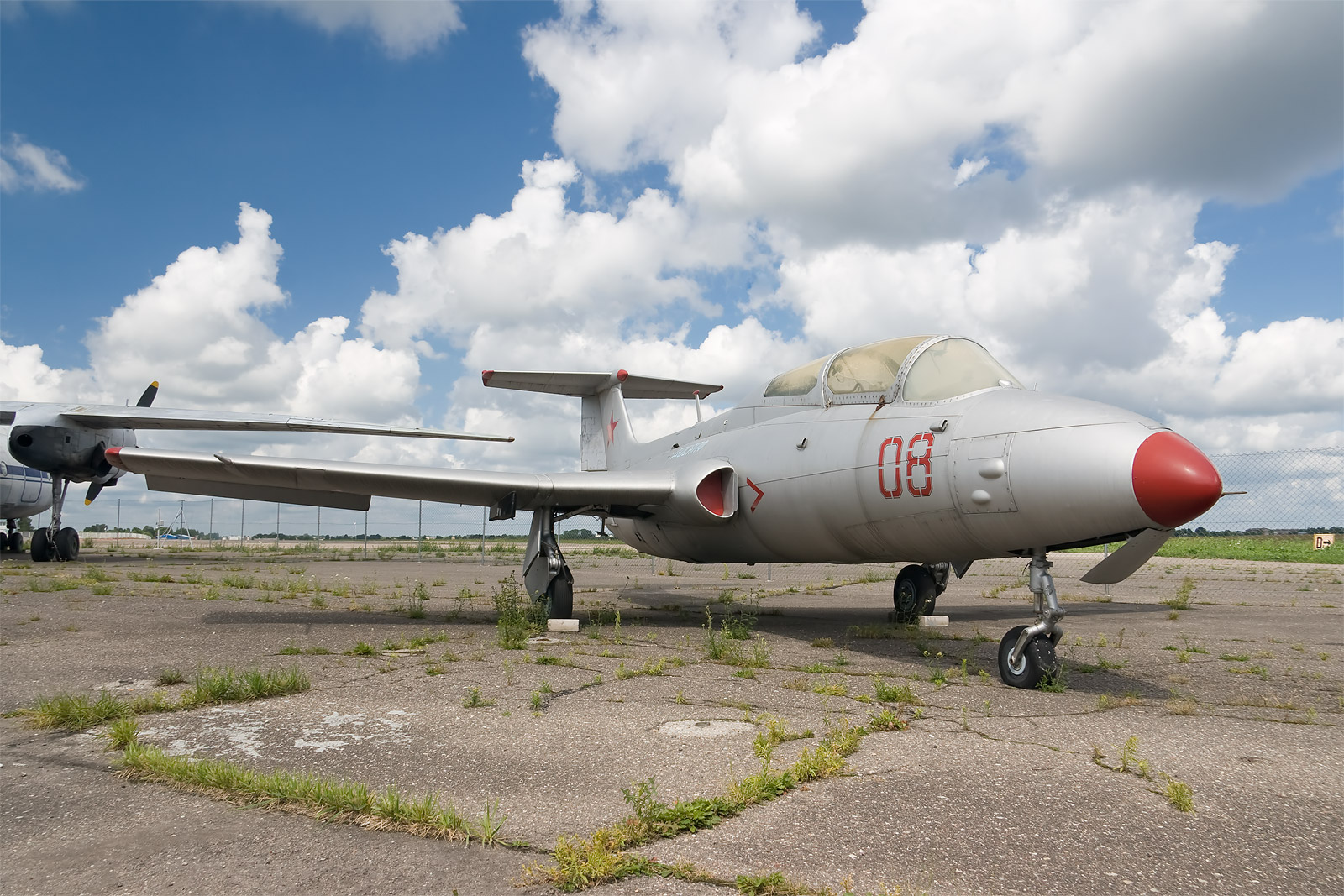
Aero L-29 at Kaunas airport

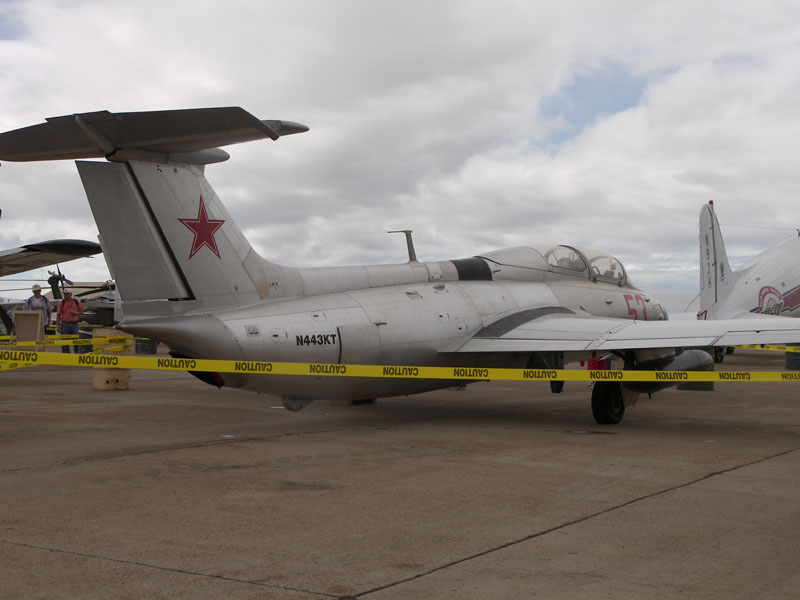
A private L-29 Delfín at the 2006 Miramar Air Show.

In the late 1950s, the Soviet Air Force commenced the search for a suitable jet-powered replacement for its fleet of piston-engined trainers; over time, this requirement was progressively broadened towards the goal of developing a trainer aircraft that could be adopted and in widespread use throughout the national air forces of the Eastern Bloc countries. Around the same time, Czechoslovakia had also been independently developing its own requirements for a suitable jet successor to its then-current propeller-powered trainer aircraft. In response to these demands, Aero decided to develop its own aircraft design; the effort was headed by a pair of aerospace engineers, Z. Rublič and K. Tomáš. Their work was centered upon the desire to produce a single design that would be suitable performing both basic and advanced levels of the training regime, carrying pilots straight through to being prepared to operate frontline combat aircraft.

The basic design concept was to produce a straightforward, easy-to-build and operate aircraft. Accordingly, both simplicity and ruggedness were stressed in the development process, leading to the adoption of manual flight controls, large flaps, and the incorporation of perforated airbrakes positioned on the fuselage sides. Aerodynamically, the L-29 was intentionally designed to possess stable and docile flight characteristics; this decision contributed to an enviable safety record for the type. The sturdy L-29 was able to operate under austere conditions, including performing take-offs from grass, sand or unprepared fields. On 5 April 1959, the prototype XL-29 conducted its maiden flight, powered by a British Bristol Siddeley Viper turbojet engine. The second prototype, which flew shortly thereafter, was instead powered by the Czech-designed M701 engine. The M-701 engine was used in all subsequent aircraft.

During 1961, the third prototype of L-29 plane (prototype "03") was evaluated against the Polish PZL TS-11 Iskra and the Russian Yakovlev Yak-30, the main rival submissions for the Warsaw Pact's standardised trainer. The thorough 2-months-long examination of all the three planes took place in Monino airfield near Moscow. The evaluation consisted not only from the test flights themselves but also from assessment of all the technical and tactical criteria expected from the standard jet trainer, as well as from evaluation of other functional and operational aspects like access to individual instruments and aggregates, cockpit ergonomics, ease of service and maintenance, time for engine replacement, and many others. The examination was organized in a very sophisticated manner and managed by a commission composed of representatives of all three countries, headed by Lieutenant General Matveyev from USSR. Shortly after the completion of the fly-offs, it was announced that the L-29 had been selected as the winner. The following recommendation was provided by the commission: For pilot training purposes, including in the use of weapons, as well as from a production and economical point of view, the L-29 is the most suitable plane. According to aviation author John C. Fredrikson, this outcome had been highly unexpected and surprising to several observers. The main advantages of the Czechoslovak trainer aircraft were reliability and durability (no failures occurred during tests, while both other competitors had several serious problems), ease of maintenance, manufacturability and low price. Performance-wise, the advantages were lowest landing speed, lowest stall speed without flaps and lowest takeoff and landing length on unpaved runways from all the competitors. For example, L-29 was the best of all in test of number of accomplished 5-minute training circuits with continuous takeoff without taxiing on the stand on one fuel tank. L-29 made 15 rounds, while competitors just 10. Due to the fact that the production of the trainer aircraft was considered in Czechoslovakia anyway regardless of the contest's results (based on Agreements on delimitation of production within the COMECON), the victory of the domestically designed L-29 was a huge advantage. Regardless of the result, Poland chose to continue to pursue the development and procurement of the TS-11; however, all of the other Warsaw Pact countries decided to adopt the Delfín under the agreements of COMECON.

During April 1963, full-scale production of the L-29 commenced; 3,600 aircraft were manufactured over a production run of 11 years. During its production life, several derivatives of the L-29 were developed, such as a dedicated, single-seat, aerobatic version, which was designated as the L-29A Akrobat. Another model, an armed reconnaissance version complete with multiple downwards-looking cameras installed in the rear cockpit position, referred to as the L-29R, was also under development; however, during 1965, the L-29R project was terminated. Optional armaments could be installed upon some models, consisting of either a detachable gun pod or a pod containing up to four unguided missiles, which could be set upon hardpoints underneath each wing.

== Design ==
The Aero L-29 Delfín is a jet-powered trainer aircraft, known for its straightforward and simplistic design and construction. In terms of its basic configuration, it used a mid-wing matched with a T-tail arrangement; the wings were unswept and accommodated engine air intakes within the wing roots. The undercarriage was reinforced and capable of withstanding considerable stresses. According to Fredriksen, the L-29 was relatively underpowered, yet exhibited several favourable characteristics in its flight performance, such as its ease of handling. The primary flying controls are manually operated; both the flaps and airbrakes were actuated via hydraulic systems.

Production aircraft were powered by the Czech-designed Motorlet M-701 turbojet engine, which was capable of generating up to 1,960lbf of thrust. Between 1961 and 1968, approximately 9,250 engines were completed; according to reports, no fewer than 5,000 of these engines were manufactured in support of the Delfín programme. The student pilot and their instructor were placed in a tandem seating layout underneath separate canopies, the instructor being placed in a slightly elevated position to better oversee the student. Both the student and instructor were provisioned with ejection seats; these were intentionally interlinked to fire in a synchronised manner if either seat was deployed as to eliminate any possibility of a mid-air collision between the two ejector seats.

During their late life, many L-29s were resold onto private operators and have seen use in the civil sector. It has become common for various modifications to be carried out to convert the type for such use; these changes would commonly include the removal of military-orientated equipment (such as the gun sight), the replacement of the metric altimeters with Western counterparts, the addition of alternative radio systems, and new ejection seats. It was also routine for several subsystems, such as the oxygen system, to be disabled rather than removed.

== Operational history ==
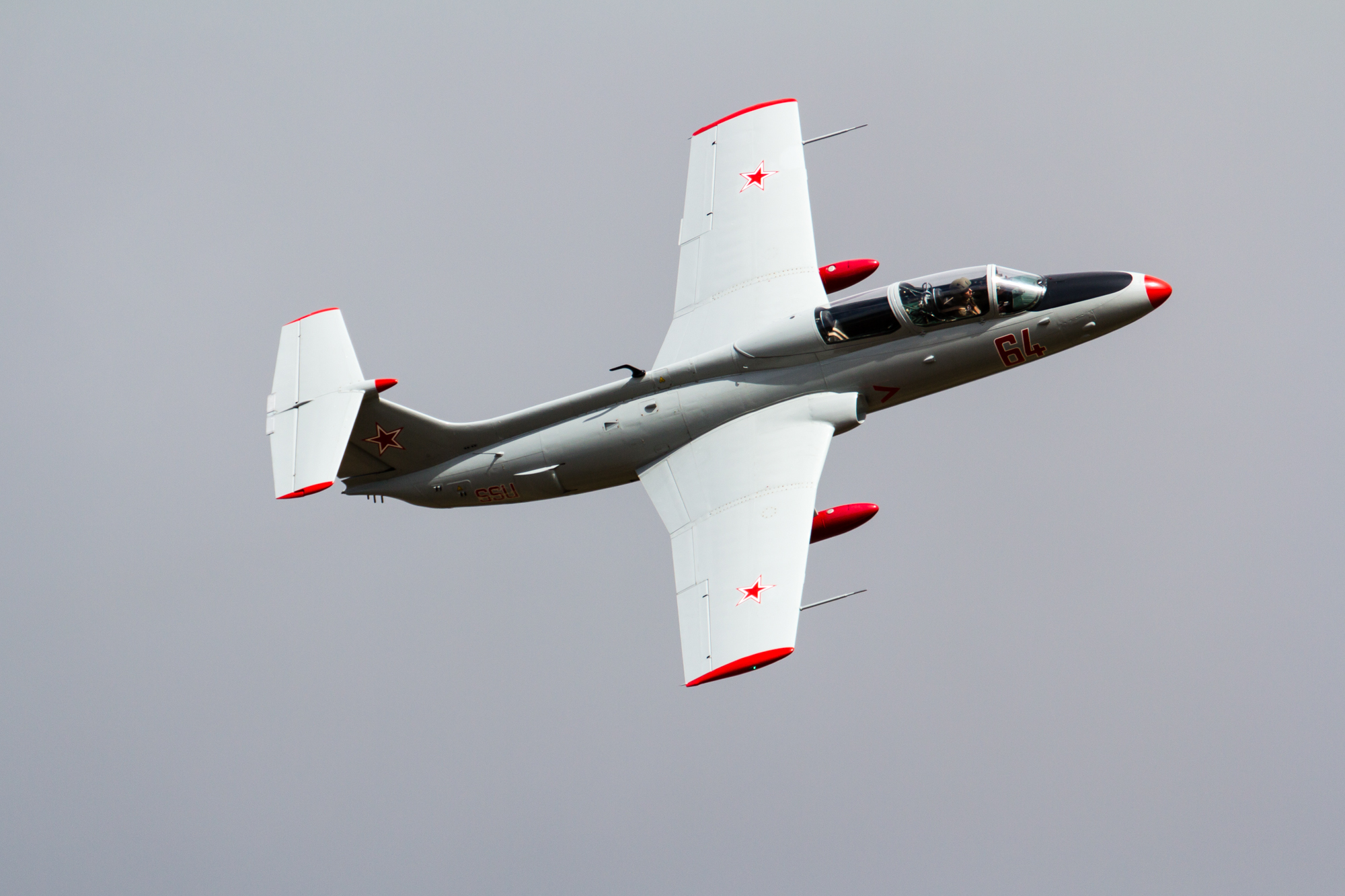
L-29 Delfín ZK-SSU

In excess of 2,000 L-29 Delfins were ultimately supplied to the Soviet Air Force. It received the NATO reporting name "Maya." In the trainer role, the L-29 enabled air forces to adopt an "all-through" training regime using only jet-powered aircraft, entirely replacing earlier piston-engined types.

The Delfín served in basic, intermediate and weapons training roles. For this latter mission, they were equipped with hardpoints to carry gunpods, bombs or rockets; according to Fredrikson, the L-29 functioned as a relatively good ground-attack aircraft when deployed as such. It saw several uses in this active combat role, such as when a number of Egyptian L-29s were dispatched on attack missions against Israeli ground forces during the Yom Kippur War of 1973. The type was also used in anger during the Nigerian Civil War of the late 1960s. On 16 July 1975, a Czechoslovak Air Force L-29 shot down a Polish civilian biplane piloted by Dionizy Bielański, who had been attempting to defect to the West.

The L-29 was supplanted in the inventory of many of its operators by the Aero L-39 Albatros. The L-29 which was commonly used alongside the newer L-39 for a time. The type was used extensively to conduct ground attack missions in the First Nagorno-Karabakh War by Azeri forces. At least 14 were shot down by Armenian air-defences, out of the total inventory of 18 L-29s; the Azeri Air Force lost large amounts of its air force due to anti aircraft fire.

On 2 October 2007, an unmodified L-29 was used for the world's first jet flight powered solely by 100 per cent biodiesel fuel. Pilots Carol Sugars and Douglas Rodante flew their Delphin Jet from Stead Airport, Reno, Nevada to Leesburg International Airport, Leesburg, Florida in order to promote environmentally friendly fuels in aviation.

The L-29, much like its L-39 successor, has found use in air racing, some of which have been re-engined with the British Armstrong Siddeley Viper turbojet engine. From 10 September to 14 September 2008, a pair of L-29s took first and second place at the Reno Air Races. Both L-29s consistently posted laps at or above 500 miles per hour; former Astronaut Curt Brown took first place in "Viper," followed by Red Bull racer Mike Mangold in "Euroburner."

Russia has claimed that it destroyed a pair of Georgian L-29s during the 2008 South Ossetia war. On 18 January 2015, separatist forces in the War in Donbas claimed that they possessed an operational L-29.

== Operators ==
=== Current military operators ===
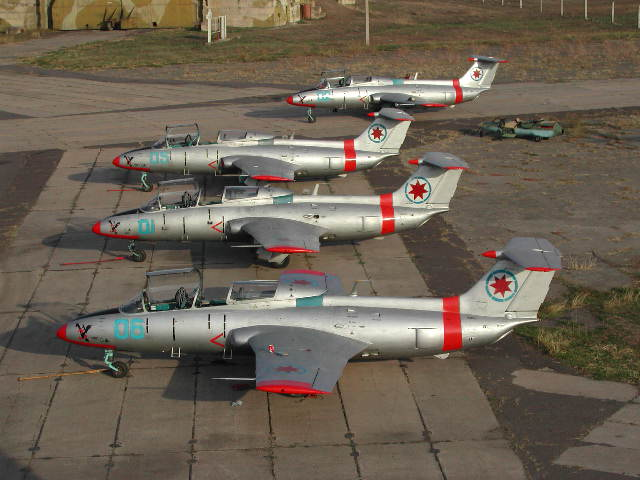
Georgian Air Force Aero L-29

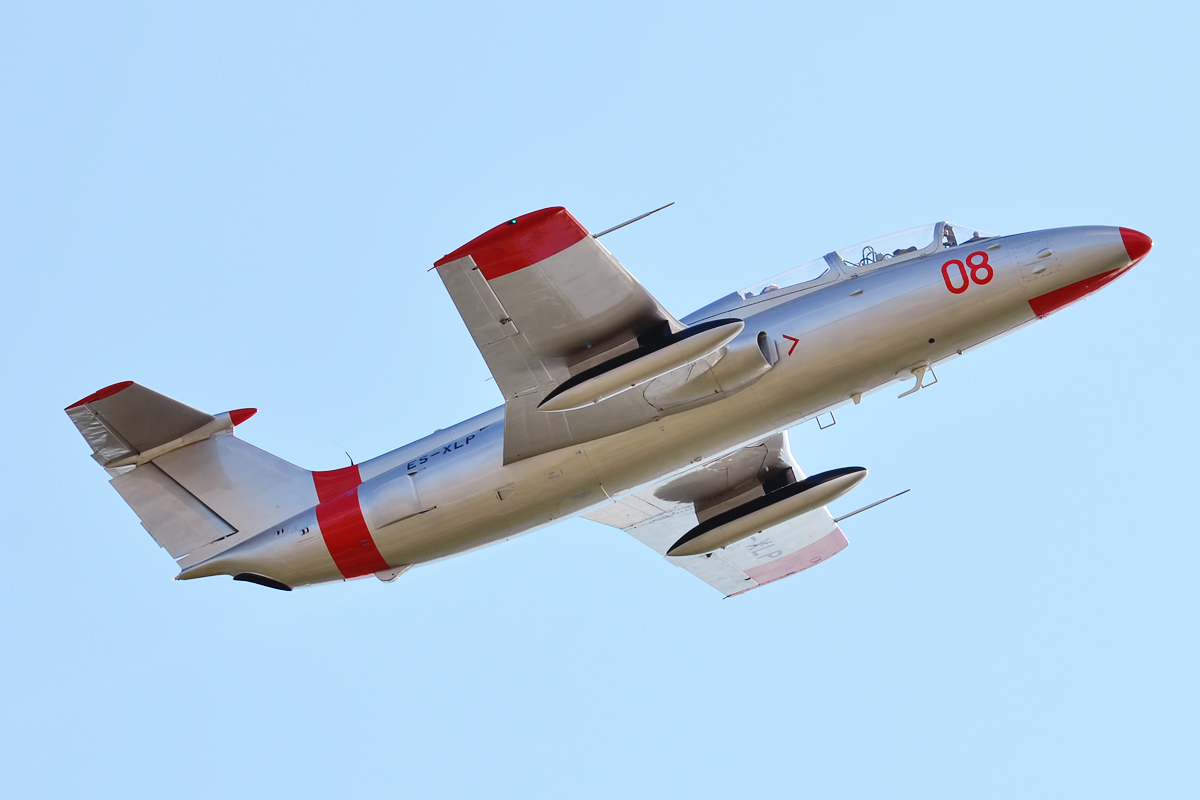
Private Aero L-29C Delfin ES-XLP

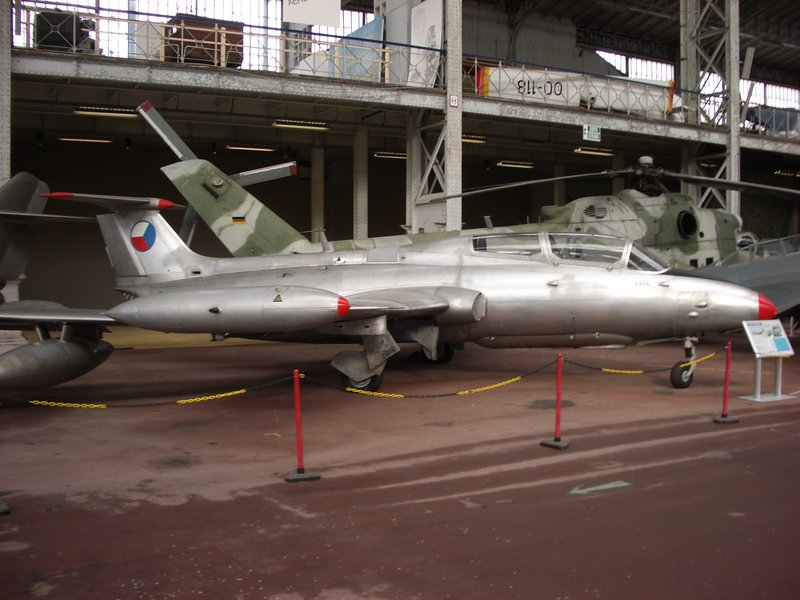
Reconnaissance Delfín

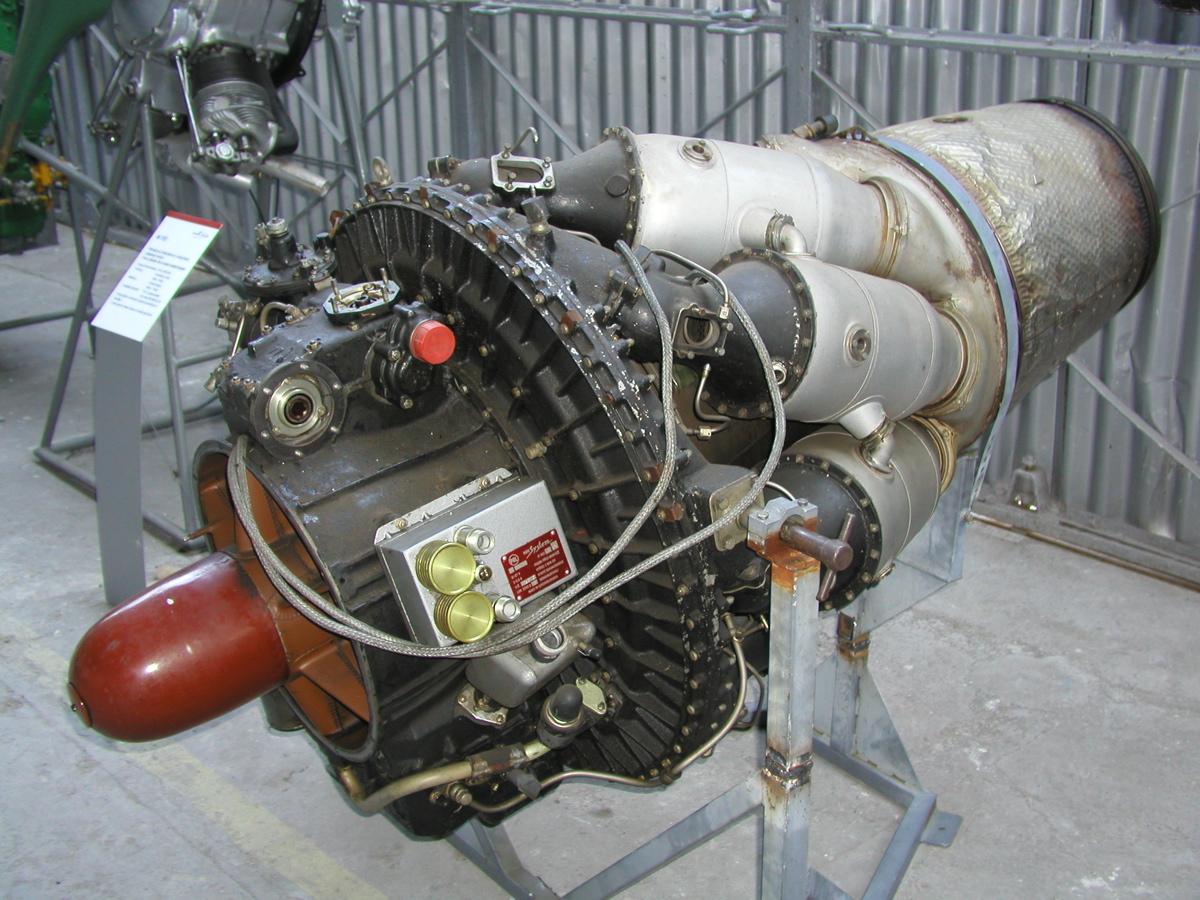
Motorlet M701 turbojet engine

Angola
National Air Force of Angola – 6 L-29s were in service as of 2022
Georgia
Army Air Section - 4 L-29s were in service as of 2022

=== Former military operators ===
Afghanistan
Afghan Air Force − Operated as many as 24 from 1978 to as late as 1999
Armenia
Armenian Air Force
Azerbaijan
Azerbaijani Air and Air Defence Force
Bulgaria
Bulgarian Air Force − Operated 102 examples, delivered between 1963–1974, retired from service in 2002
Chechen Republic of Ichkeria
Armed Forces of the Chechen Republic of Ichkeria

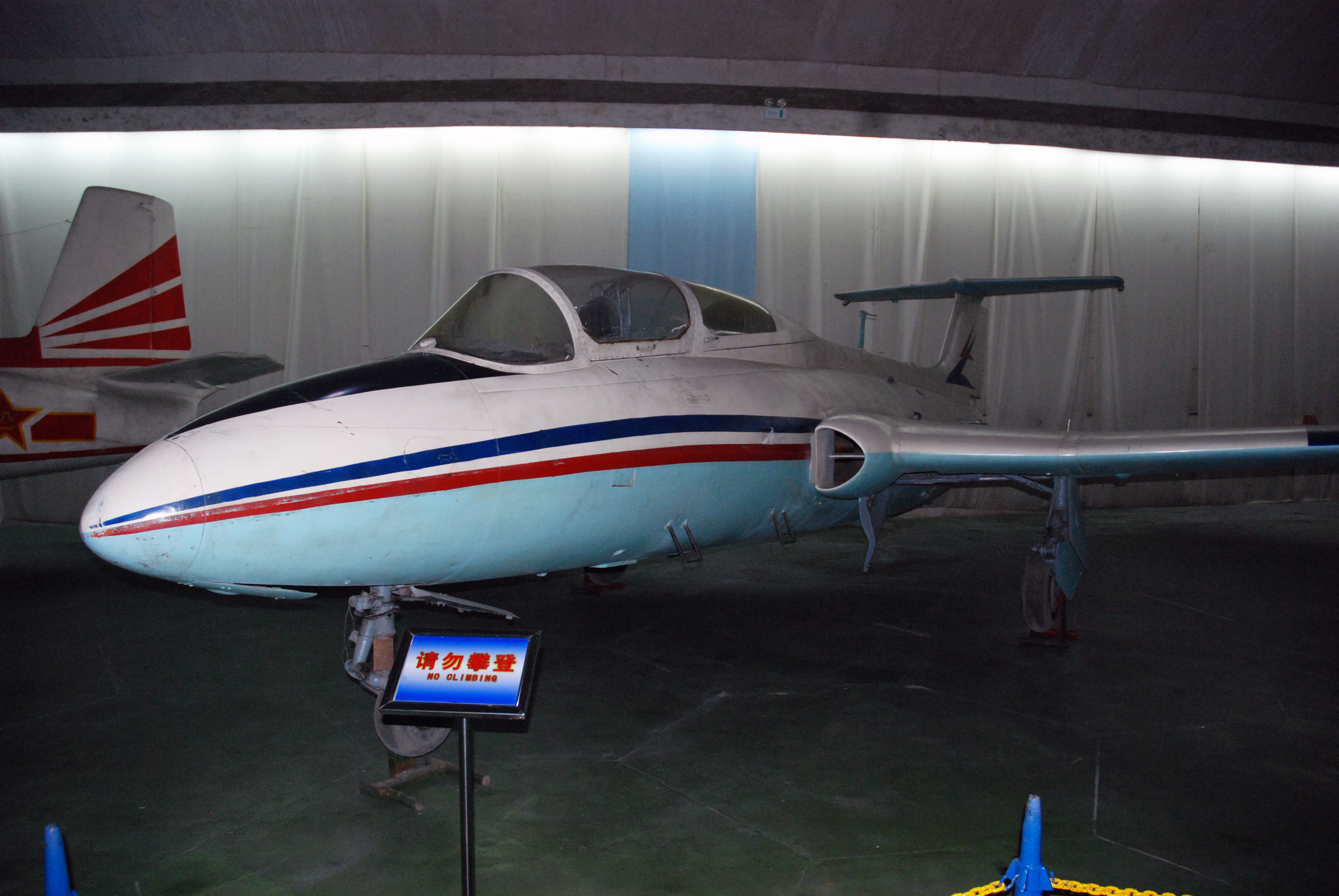
The Chinese PLAAF L-29.

China
People's Liberation Army Air Force − Received 4 in 1968
Czechoslovakia
Czechoslovak Air Force
Czech Republic
Czech Air Force
East Germany
East German Air Force
Egypt
Egyptian Air Force
Ghana
Ghana Air Force
Guinea
Military of Guinea
Hungary
Hungarian Air Force

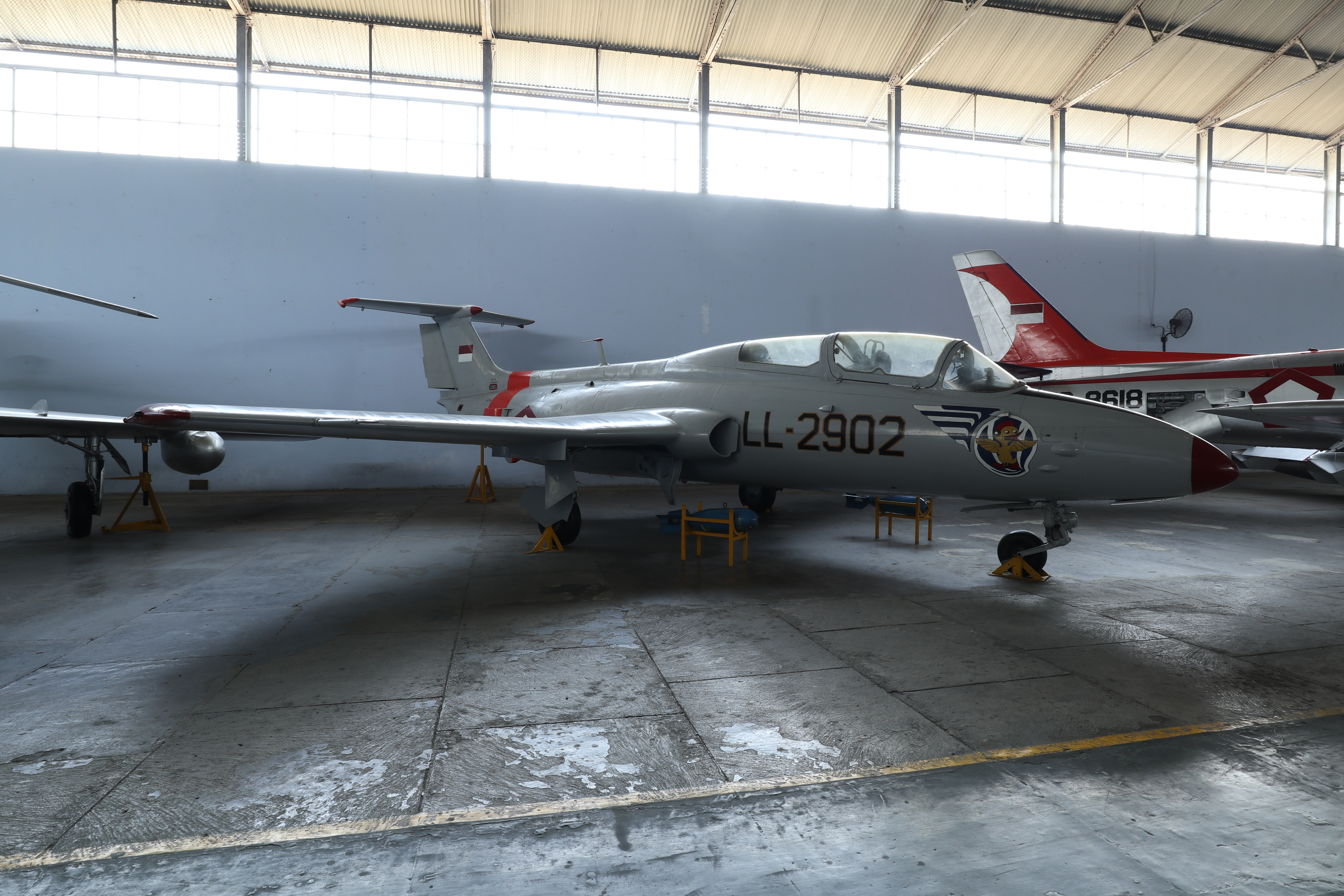
Indonesian Air Force L-29 Delfin at Dirgantara Mandala Museum

Indonesia
Indonesian Air Force
Iraq
Iraqi Air Force – Received 78 between 1968 and 1974. A number were converted to unmanned aerial vehicles in the 1990s
Mali
Air Force of Mali – 6 remained in service as late as December 2012
Nigeria
Nigerian Air Force
Romania
Romanian Air Force – Retired in 2006
Slovakia
Slovak Air Force – 16 received following the dissolution of Czechoslovakia. They were withdrawn from service in 2003
Syria
Syrian Air Force
Uganda
Ugandan Air Force
Ukraine
Ukrainian Air Force
Vietnam
Vietnam People's Air Force
United States
United States Navy

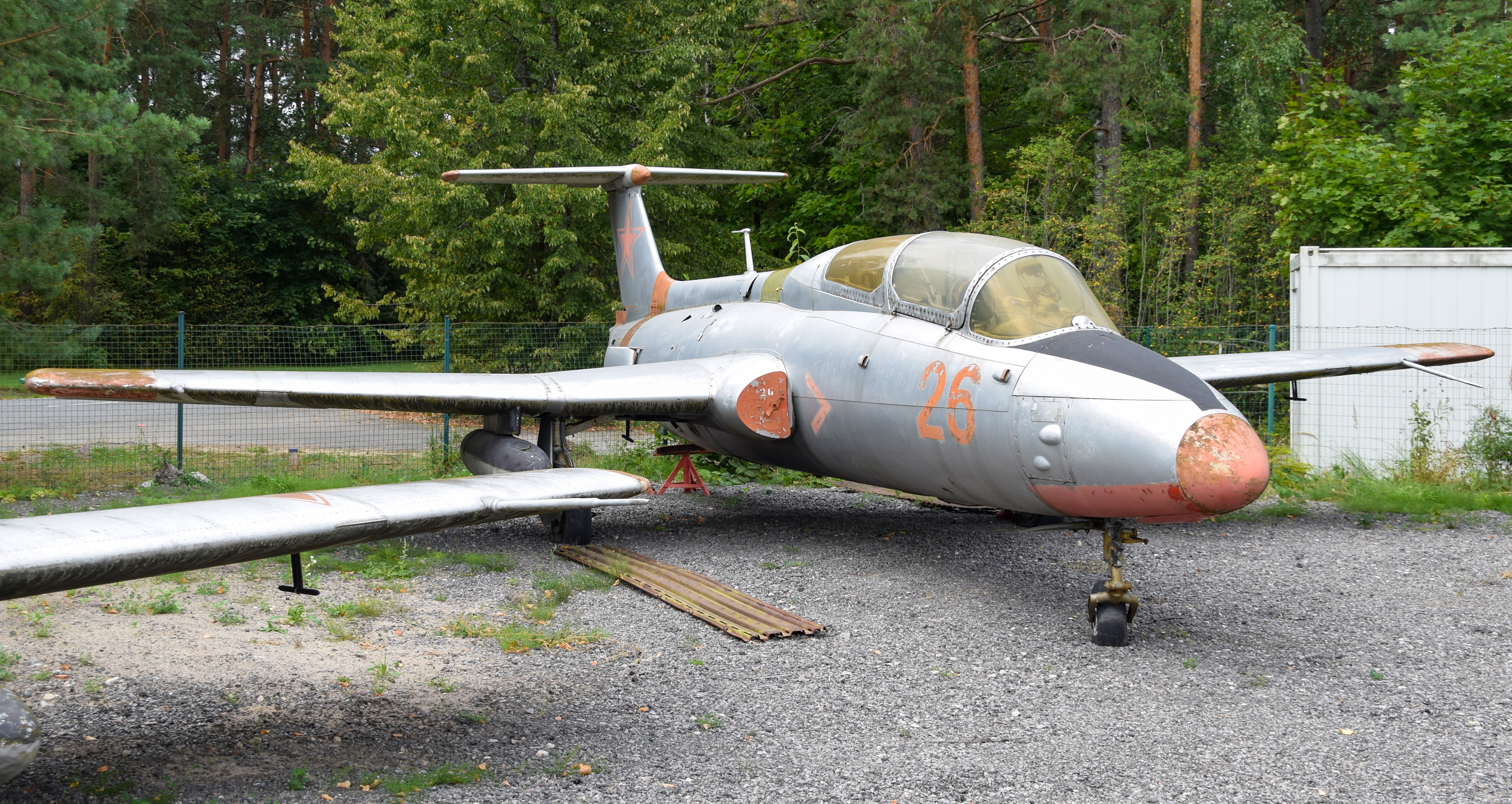
Soviet Aero L-29 on display at the Riga Aviation Museum

Soviet Union
operated as many as 2,000

- DOSAAF
- Soviet Air Force

=== Civilian operators ===
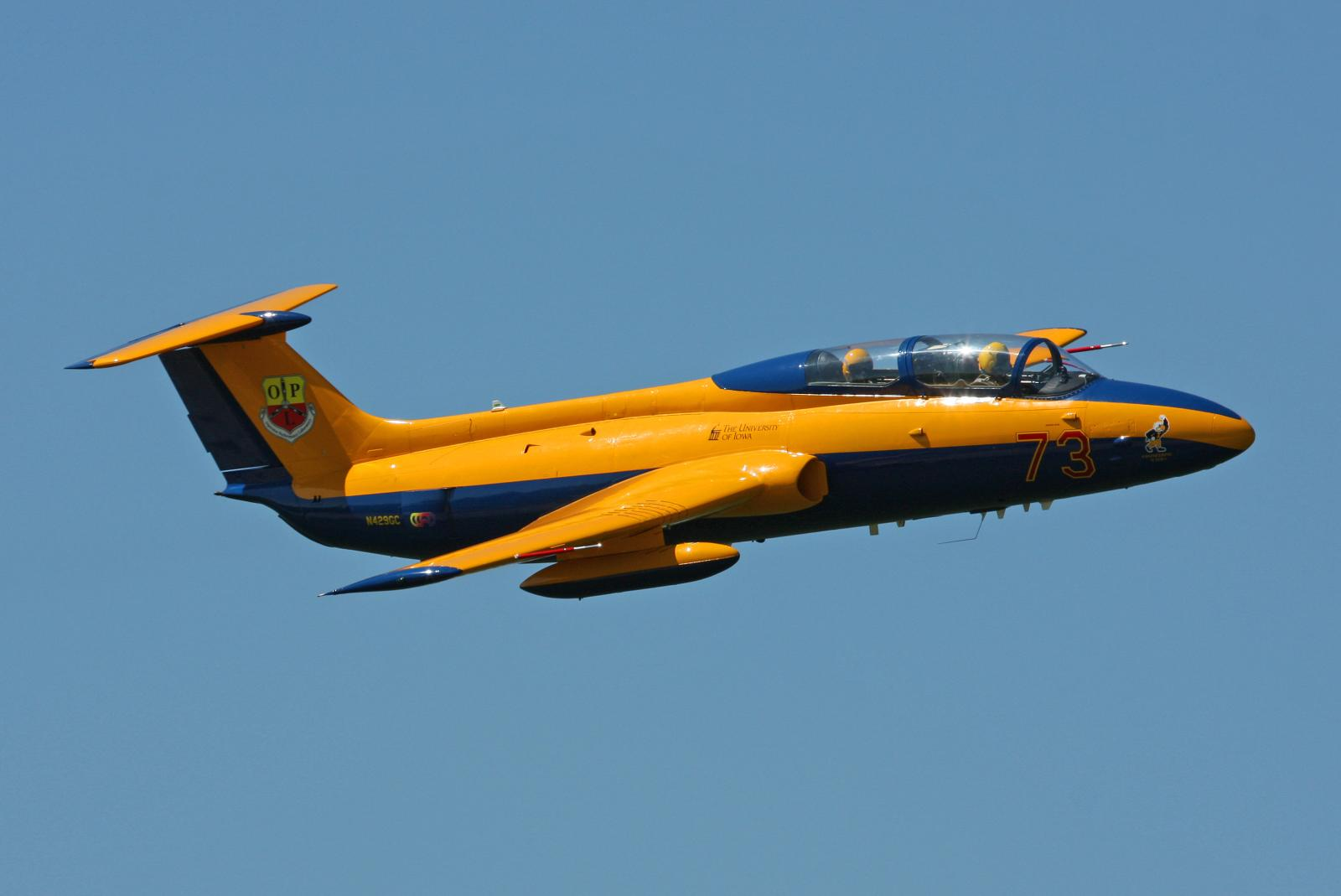
An L-29 owned by the University of Iowa College of Engineering, used for research and testing

Canada
- Three private L-29s, operated by International Test Pilots School, Canada as Flight Test Training tools.
- Two private L-29s, operated by the ACER Cold War Museum. Ex-Bulgarian Air Force.
- Private L-29, operated by Waterloo Warbirds.
Czech Republic

- Private L-29C, OK-ATS, Czech Jet Team Žatec – Macerka. Plane crashed on 10 June 2012 due to pilot negligence, both pilot and passenger died.
- Private L-29, OK-AJW, Blue Sky Service Brno – Tuřany.

Denmark

- One L-29C, OY-LSD owned by Lasse Rungholm, Niels Egelund (until 31.12.2015), Claus Brøgger and Kåre Selvejer.

New Zealand

- L-29 ZK-SSU and ZK-VAU operated by Soviet Star from Christchurch International Airport.

Russia

- One civilian L-29 and one L-29 Viper operated by Feniks Aeroclub outside Moscow

Slovakia

- One private L-29, OM-FLP, owned and operated with L29.SK ltd.
- One private L-29, OM-SLK, owned and operated with l29delfin.sk ltd.
- One private L-29C, OM-JET, owned by Ján Slota, grounded
- One L-29, OM-JLP is owned by Slovtepmont Inc., crushed and destroyed with pilot Jozef Vaško, grounded

United States

- Two are operated by the University of Iowa College of Engineering's Operator Performance Laboratory. Used as high dynamics flight research aircraft for development of pilot state characterization
- One L-29, N29CZ, is operated by World Heritage Air Museum, in Detroit, Michigan.
- One as an avionics high dynamics flight test aircraft at the Ohio University Avionics Engineering Center
- One private L-29, N89CZ (Formerly N329CA) is owned and piloted by Peter Surina of Czeskoslovenske Jets, LLC in Virginia, USA

== Accidents ==
Colonel Shittu Alao, the second indigenous Chief of Air Staff (CAS) of the Nigerian Air Force (NAF), died in an air crash on October 15, 1969, during the Nigerian Civil War (Biafran War) while flying solo in an L-29 Delfín jet near Uzebba, Nigeria, due to severe weather and fuel exhaustion, crashing into a tree while trying to make an emergency landing. His death was a significant loss, occurring while he was actively leading the NAF, and he was buried with full military honors in Lagos. Key Details of the Incident: Who: Colonel Shittu Alao, Chief of Air Staff (1967-1969). When: October 15, 1969. Where: Near Uzebba, about 50 miles northwest of Benin City, Nigeria (present-day Edo State). Aircraft: An L-29 Delfín jet trainer. Cause: Bad weather (severe wind/fog) and running out of fuel, leading to a crash during an emergency landing attempt. Context: He was leading the NAF during the Civil War, personally flying missions, and his loss was a blow to the young air force. Legacy: He is remembered as a pioneer and founding father of the Nigerian Air Force. His leadership, bravery, and sacrifice during the war are still honored. He was buried with full military honors at the Ikoyi Military Cemetery.

- On 18 August 2000, a privately owned L-29 was destroyed after it impacted with the water during an aerobatic display at the Eastbourne Airbourne Air Show, at Eastbourne, East Sussex, England. The pilot, a former member of the Royal Air Force's (RAF) Red Arrows display team, was killed with no visible signs of attempting to eject from the aircraft.
- On 18 September 2022, a privately owned L-29 crashed while taking part in the Reno Air Races in Nevada, killing the pilot.
- On 12 November 2023, a privately owned L-29 crashed during an aerobatic maneuver at an air show in Villa Cañás, Argentina, killing the pilot and co-pilot.

== Specifications (L-29) ==

Data from Jane's All The World's Aircraft 1971–72

General characteristics

- Crew: 2
- Length: 10.81 m (35 ft 6 in)
- Wingspan: 10.29 m (33 ft 9 in)
- Height: 3.13 m (10 ft 3 in)
- Wing area: 19.80 m^{2} (213.1 sq ft)
- Aspect ratio: 5.36:1
- Airfoil: NACA63_{2}A217 at root, NACA 64_{2}A212 at tip
- Empty weight: 2,280 kg (5,027 lb)
- Max takeoff weight: 3,280 kg (7,231 lb)
- Fuel capacity: 962 L (254 US gal; 212 imp gal), provision for 2× 150 L (40 US gal; 33 imp gal) external tanks
- Powerplant: 1 × Motorlet M-701c 500 turbojet, 8.7 kN (1,960 lbf) thrust

Performance

- Maximum speed: 655 km/h (407 mph, 354 kn) at 5,000 m (16,400 ft)
- Stall speed: 130 km/h (81 mph, 70 kn) (flaps down)
- Never exceed speed: 820 km/h (510 mph, 440 kn)
- Range: 894 km (556 mi, 483 nmi) (with external tanks)
- Endurance: 2 hr 30 min
- Service ceiling: 11,000 m (36,000 ft)
- Rate of climb: 14.00 m/s (2,755 ft/min)

Armament

- Guns: 2x 7.62mm machine gun pods on hardpoints
- Hardpoints: 2
- Rockets: 8× air-to-ground rockets
- Bombs: 2× 100 kg (220 lb) bombs

== See also ==
Related development

- Aero L-39 Albatros
- Aero L-59 Super Albatros

Aircraft of comparable role, configuration, and era

- Aermacchi MB-326
- Fouga Magister
- Morane-Saulnier MS.760 Paris
- PZL TS-11 Iskra
- Soko G-2 Galeb
