= Motorlet M-701 =

1950s Czechoslovak turbojet engine

M-701
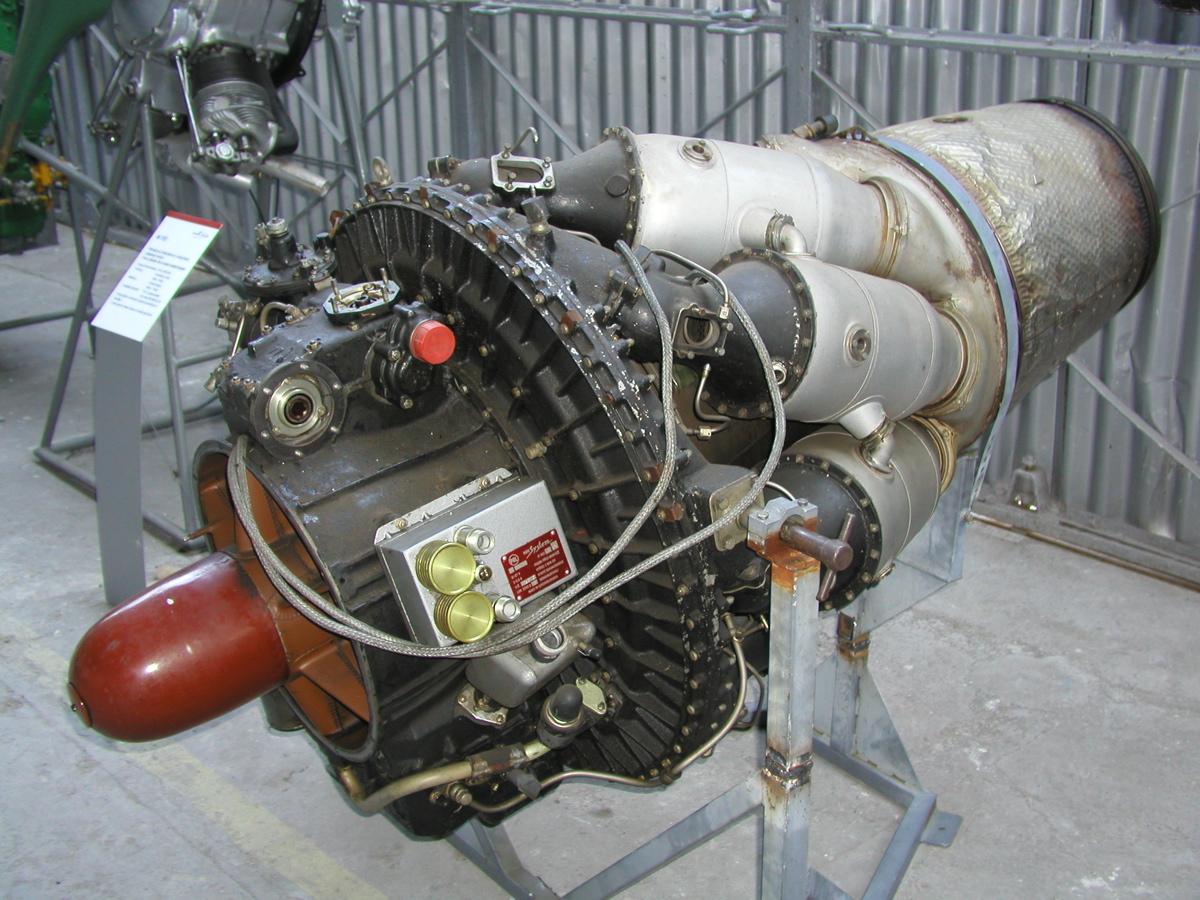
- Motorlet M701 turbojet engine (displayed at the Aviation Museum in Košice, Slovakia)
- Type: Turbojet
- National origin: Czechoslovakia
- Manufacturer: Motorlet
- First run: 1958
- Major applications: Aero L-29 Delfín
- Manufactured: 1961–1989
- Number built: more than 9,250

The Motorlet M-701 is a Czechoslovak jet engine. It was used to power the Aero L-29 Delfín jet trainer, with about 9,250 engines built between 1961 and 1989.

== Development and design ==
In 1955, the Czechoslovak aero-engine company Motorlet commenced design of a new turbojet engine to power the Aero L-29, a jet trainer being designed by Aero for a competition to equip all Warsaw Pact air forces. The resulting design, designated Motorlet M-701 was a single-shaft centrifugal-compressor turbojet and was the first jet engine designed in Czechoslovakia (although Motorlet had previously built the Klimov VK-1 under license).

The M-701 was first run in 1958, and engine no. 4 was tested on an Avia B-228 flying laboratory in December 1959. Engine no. 8 powered the third prototype L-29 when it flew on 12 July 1960 (the first two prototypes had flown the previous year powered by Rolls-Royce Viper engines). The L-29 was selected as the winner of the competition and was ordered in large numbers, with the M-701 entering production at Jinonice, Prague in 1961. By the time production ended in 1989, more than 9,250 had been built.

== Applications ==
- Aero L-29 Delfín

== Specifications ==
Data from Jane's All the World's Aircraft 1971-72.

==== General characteristics ====
- Type: Single shaft centrifugal flow turbojet engine
- Length: 2,067 mm (81.38 in)
- Diameter: 896 mm (35.28 in) (max. width) × 928 mm (36.53 in) (max. height)
- Dry weight: 330 kg (728 lb)

==== Components ====
- Compressor: Single-stage centrifugal
- Combustors: 7 straight-flow combustion chambers
- Turbine: Single-stage axial-flow with 61 blades

==== Performance ====
- Maximum thrust: 8.75 kN (1,962 lbf) (Take-off power: 15,500 rpm), 7.87 kN (1,764 lbf) (Rated power: 14,950 rpm)
- Overall pressure ratio: 4.3 : 1
- Air mass flow: 19.6 kg/s (37.25 lb/s)
- Specific fuel consumption: 1.14 lb/(lbf⋅h) (at rated power)
- Thrust-to-weight ratio: 2.7

== See also ==
Related lists

- List of aircraft engines
