= 1975 An-2 shootdown incident =

Cold War incident over Czechoslovakia

- Part of the Cold War
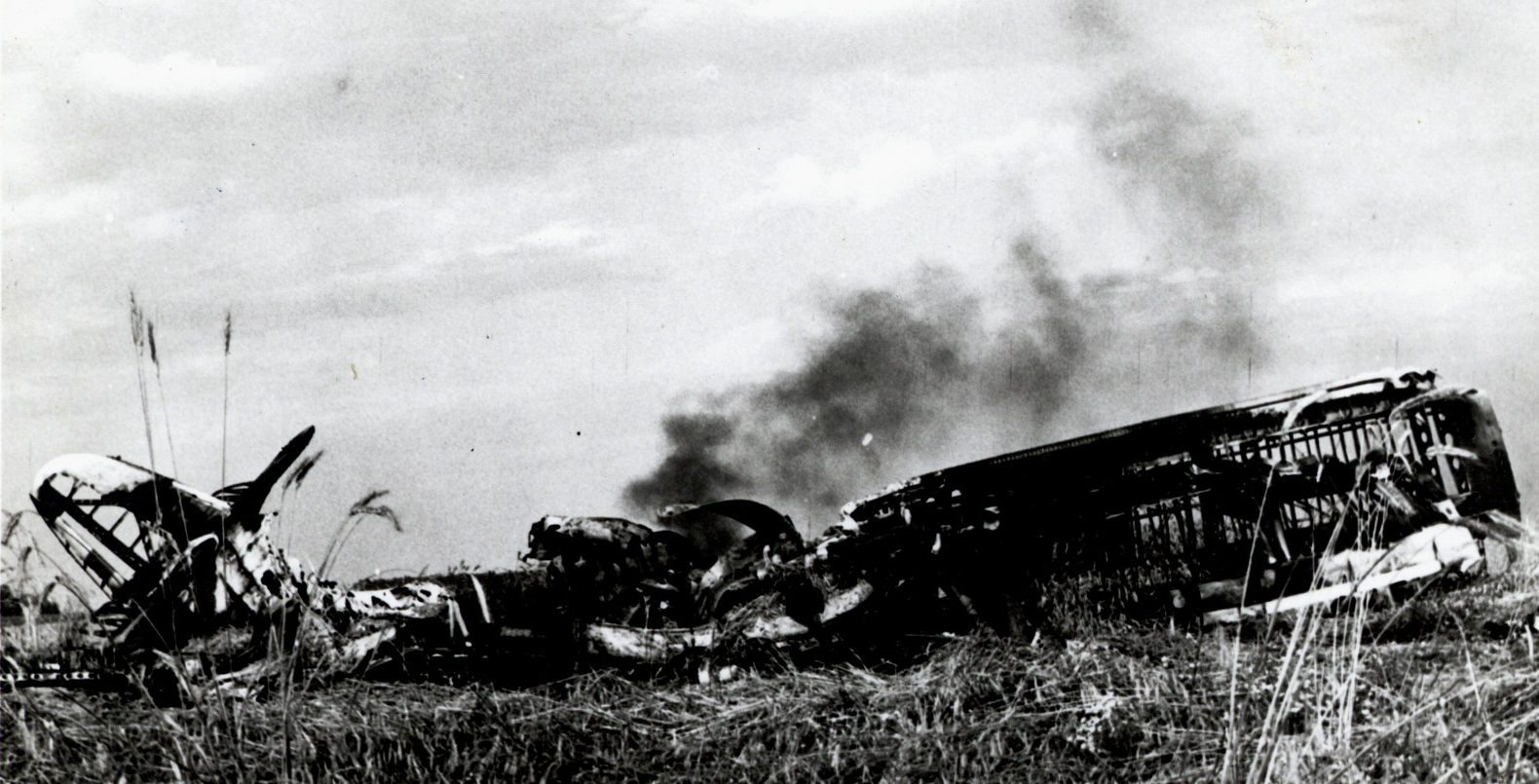
- Site of the wreckage
- Type: Aircraft shot-down
- Location: Kúty, Czechoslovakia; 48°37′55″N 17°02′36″E
- Objective: Capture of defector
- Date: 16 July 1975; 15:56 Central European Summer Time
- Executed by: Czechoslovak Air Force
- Casualties: 1 killed

On 16 July 1975, an Antonov An-2 utility biplane was shot down over Slovakia by a Czechoslovak Air Force Aero L-29 Delfin trainer while attempting to reach Austrian airspace. The aircraft had took off from Gawłówek, near Bochnia in Poland, and had been commandeered by flight instructor Dionizy Bielański, in an apparent attempt to defect to the West. The An-2 eventually crashed near the western Slovak town of Kúty, then Czechoslovakia, killing the pilot. General Wojciech Jaruzelski, then Minister of Defense of Poland and later de facto President of the country, who apparently issued the order to brought down the An-2, was charged with the death of Bielański in 2013.

== Dionizy Bielański ==
Dionizy Bielański was born in the village of Staweczki, Volhynia region, then part of Poland, the son of Szymon and Wacława Bielański, née Lewandowska. Bielański got his first job at a textile factory in Jelenia Gora. He graduated from the Polish Air Force University in Dęblin in 1968, and was hired by the gliding school in Żar. The following year, Bielański became instructor at the Opole Aeroclub. In 1971 Bielański was approached by the Polish Secret Service, but, being not aligned with the communist regime, he rejected their offer. in 1972 he was employed by the Zakład Usług Agrolotniczych (ZUA) (State Agricultural Aviation Services) in Gdánsk to work in crop dusting. In 1973 Bielański was transferred to the Wroclaw chapter of the company. In all those years, the secret service continued to badger him to cooperate.

== Shooting down ==
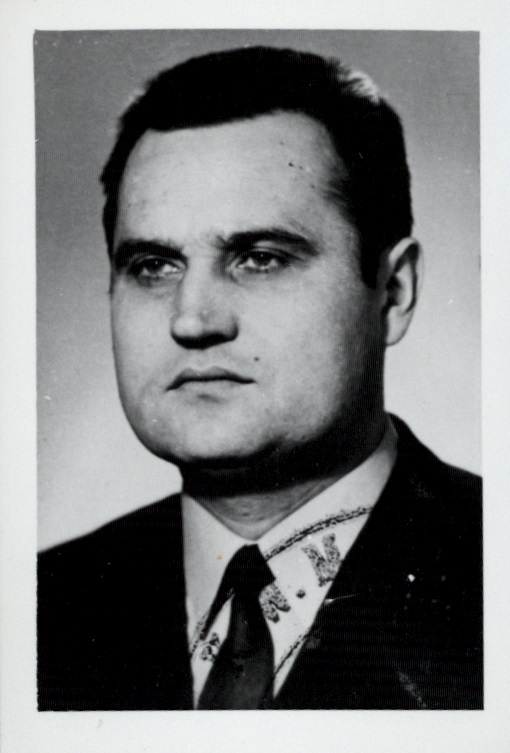
Dionizy Bielański in 1968

Starting on 2 July 1975, Bielański was carrying out aerial spraying duties over Niepołomice forest. The mechanics assisting him were put under arrest on 14 July by officers from the Municipal Headquarters of the Citizens' Militia in Kraków, on charges of stealing aviation spirit. There was an unsuccessful attempt by the authorities to implicate Bielański in the case.

On 16 July Bielański decided to escape to Austria piloting a civilian An-2 aircraft (serial number 1G144-38). Bielański, with the excuse of a trip to Wroclaw, took off for what would be his final flight from the airfield in Gawłówek, near Bochnia, in the Lesser Poland region. It was later established that the pilot had traced a flight route over Czechoslovakia and had a list with the frequence of the Czechoslovak radio beacons on his path, to overcome any bad weather condition. He prepared for a long flight by taking on an additional 158.5 gallons of fuel. Bielański flew at a low altitude, staying within the radar shadow.

As the An-2 was flying over the border with Czechoslovakia, it was spotted from the air base in Žilina, and soon Czechoslovak military aircraft took off after the imtruder: one MiG-21 fighter jet and two Aero L-29 Delfín combat trainer aircraft. Czechoslovak law did not allow shooting down a civilian aircraft, but on the orders of his superiors. Bielański did not responded to calls for landing and warning shots; Major General Josef Marušák gave the order to open fire and his aircraft was subsequently raked with machine gun fire and shot down by one of the L-29s pilots, Captain Vlastimil Navrátil. The An-2 caught fire and crashed near the town of Kúty, eight kilometers from the Austrian border. Bielański was killed instantly.

== Aftermath ==
Dionizy Bielański was married and had two daughters. There is a claim that Polish and Czechoslovak authorities hesitated to shot at the plane because they suspected that Bielański was fleeing the country carrying his wife and children with him. His body was returned to his family in a sealed coffin, which the authorities did not allow to be opened. Dionizy Bielański was buried in the cemetery in Półwieś near Opole.

According to an investigation conducted by the Polish Institute of National Remembrance, the Czechoslovak Air Force claimed that the order to shoot down had come from Poland, specifically from Minister of Defense General Wojciech Jaruzelski. In 2013, Jaruselski was charged with murder. Historian Antoni Dudek states that, while Jaruzelski had no authority to order the shooting down outright, he certainly gave permission to the Czechoslovak military authorities, following established protocols between Warsaw Pact's members regarding defectors from neighbouring countries.

== See also ==
- Air battle over Merklín
