= High Blue Wall =

- Directed by: Vladimír Čech
- Written by: Václav Podzimek, Milan Růžička, Vladimír Čech, Miloslav Vydra
- Starring: Martin Růžek; Jiří Bednář
- Music by: Štěpán Lucký
- Release date: June 1, 1974
- Running time: 91 minutes
- Country: Czechoslovakia
- Language: Czech

High Blue Wall (Czech: Vysoká modrá zeď) is a 1974 Czechoslovak action drama film directed by Vladimír Čech. It is inspired by Air battle over Merklín. It was the first Czech film to use 70 mm technology. The film has been called Czechoslovak Top Gun. it wasn't very successful with audiences and gained negative reception.

== Cast ==
- Martin Růžek as General Dvořák
- Jiří Bednář as Capt. Jelínek
- Jiří Němeček as Colonel Šmíd
- Josef Langmiler as Major Josef Švestka
- Josef Chvalina as Major Pekař
- Gustav Heverle as Major Pecka
- Vanda Švarcová as Secretary Libuška
- Jiří Krampol as Lieutenant Zdeněk Netopil
- Ladislav Trojan as Lieutenant Vašíček
