= Merklín (Plzeň-South District) =

- Municipality
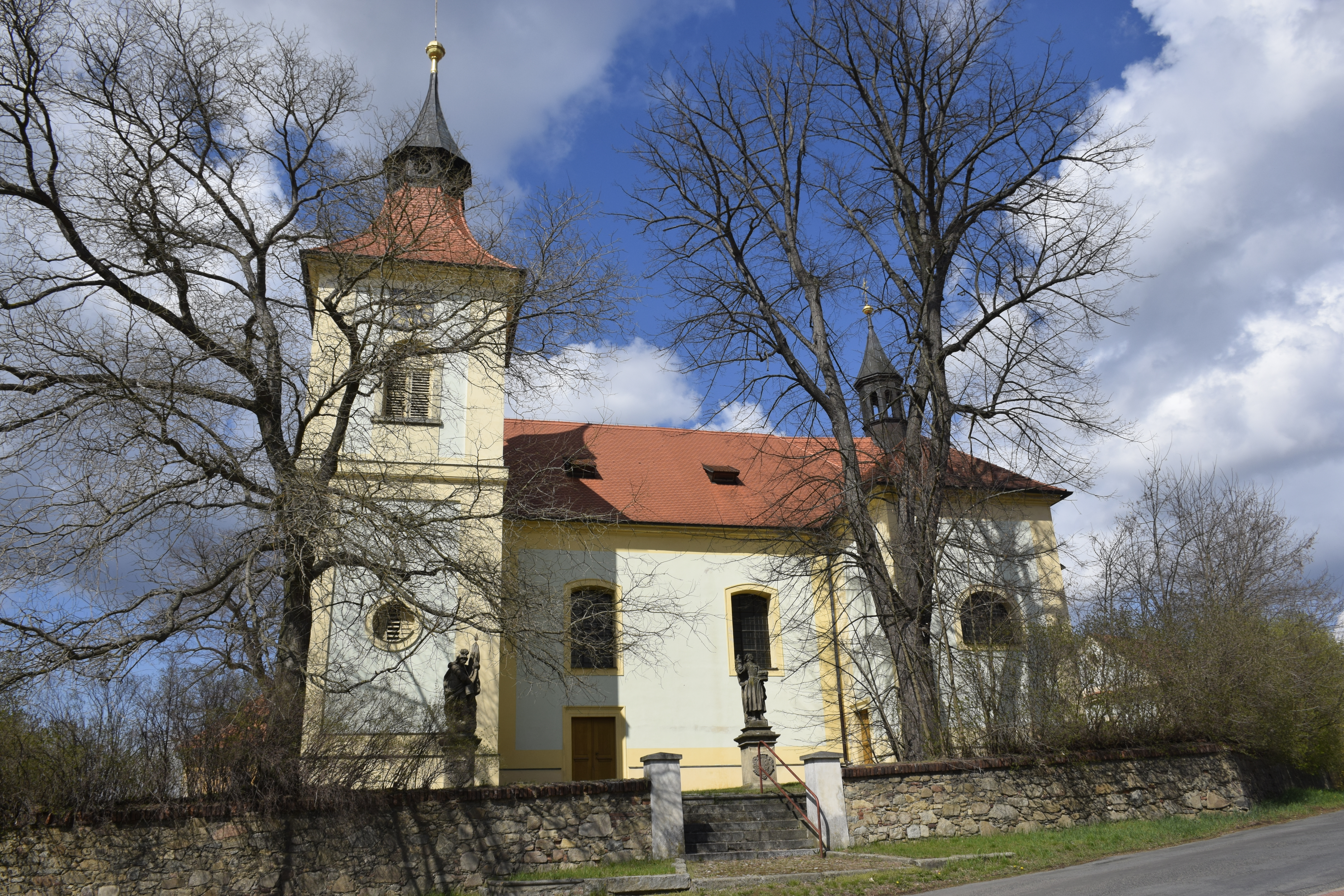
- Church of Saint Nicholas

- Coat of arms

- Location in the Czech Republic
- Coordinates: 49°33′38″N 13°11′53″E
- Country: Czech Republic
- Region: Plzeň
- District: Plzeň-South
- First mentioned: 1356

Area
  - Total: 17.01 km^{2} (6.57 sq mi)
- Elevation: 385 m (1,263 ft)

Population (2026-01-01)
  - Total: 1,169
  - Density: 68.72/km^{2} (178.0/sq mi)
- Time zone: UTC+1 (CET)
  - Summer (DST): UTC+2 (CEST)
- Postal code: 334 52
- Website: www.merklin.cz

Merklín is a municipality and village in Plzeň-South District in the Plzeň Region of the Czech Republic. It has about 1,200 inhabitants.

== Administrative division ==
Merklín consists of three municipal parts (in brackets population according to the 2021 census):

- Merklín (1,031)
- Kloušov (73)
- Lhota (32)

== Etymology ==
The name Merklín is derived from the personal German name Merklin, who was probably the founder or lokator of the settlement.

== Geography ==
Merklín is located about 23 kilometres (14 mi) southwest of Plzeň. It lies in the Švihov Highlands. The highest point is the hill Prašivý vrch at 479 m (1,572 ft) above sea level. The Merklínka Stream flows through the municipality.

The fishpond Merklínský rybník is built here at the confluence of the Merklínka with the stream Biřkovský potok. It has an area of 35 ha (86 acres).

== History ==
A predecessor of Merklín was a medieval village called Bijadla, first mentioned in 1115 as a property of the monastery in Kladruby and later abandoned. The first written mention of Merklín is from 1356, when it was already a market town. It was owned by various local lesser nobles. From 1431 to the end of the 15th century, Merklín was ruled by a family that called themselves Merklínský of Merlín. At the end of the 15th century, Merklín was purchased by Vilém of Chřínov, who established the fishpond Merklínský rybník. The Lords of Chřínov owned Merklín until 1595, when they sold it to the Lords of Říčany.

During the rule of the Lords of Říčany, Merklín prospered, but their properties were confiscated as a result of the Battle of White Mountain, and other blows were the fire in 1621 and the plundering by Ernst von Mansfeld's army during the Thirty Years' War. Indebted Merklín was bought by Vilém of Klenová, but Merklín situation worsened during the war and after the war ended, the market town was in a desolate state and abandoned. After Vilém of Klenová died in 1652, Merklín changed hands several times.

During the rule of Jan Gref of Grefenburk, Merklín was resettled by Germans from Bavaria and Palatinate. In 1659, Jakub Filip Berchtold bought the village. The Berchtolds sold the estate to the Novohradský branch of the Kolowrat family in 1692. From the 1720s, the Morzin family owned the market town. During their rule, Merklín experienced a period of great development and prosperity. The last feudal owners of Merklín were the Krakovský branch of the Kolowrat family, who inherited the market town from the Morzins in 1815.

Merklín had a Jewish community that founded a Jewish cemetery in 1685. In the 19th century, the community had several dozen inhabitants. The synagogue was built in 1826.

== Demographics ==
Historical population

Year	Pop.	±%
1869	1,729	—
1880	1,878	+8.6%
1890	2,056	+9.5%
1900	2,275	+10.7%
1910	2,261	−0.6%

Year	Pop.	±%
1921	2,205	−2.5%
1930	1,901	−13.8%
1950	1,306	−31.3%
1961	1,384	+6.0%
1970	1,156	−16.5%

Year	Pop.	±%
1980	1,064	−8.0%
1991	1,063	−0.1%
2001	1,021	−4.0%
2011	1,182	+15.8%
2021	1,136	−3.9%

Source: Censuses

== Transport ==
There are no railways or major roads passing through the municipality.

== Sights ==
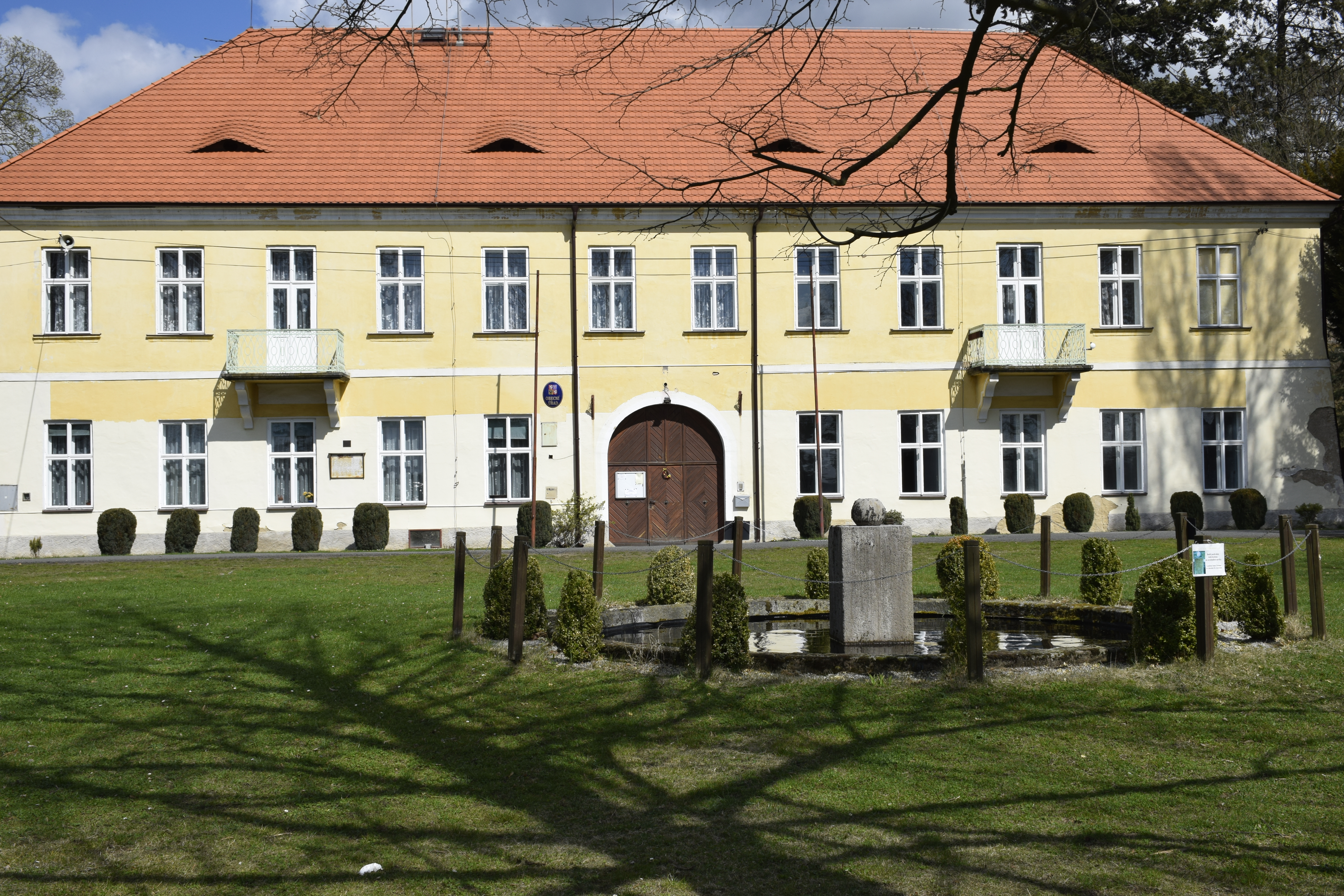
Merklín Castle

Among the main landmark of Merklín is the Merklín Castle. It was built in the early Baroque style around 1670, when it replaced a fortress from the end of the 15th century. The castle was rebuilt into its present Neoclassical form in 1824–1825 (probably due to damage from the fire in 1817). Today it houses the municipal office.

The Church of Saint Nicholas was originally a Gothic church, rebuilt in the early Baroque style at the end of the 17th century, after it was damaged by the 1681 fire. After being damaged again by fire, it was reconstructed in the Neoclassical style in 1817. In front of the church stand valuable Baroque statues from 1765.
